= 2022 Brazilian gubernatorial elections =

- October 7, 2010 (1st round); October 28, 2010 (2nd round)
| Party | PT | UNIÃO | MDB |
| Governors | 4 | 4 | 3 |
| Governorship change | ▲1 | — | — |
| Party | PSDB | PSB | PL |
| Governors | 3 | 3 | 2 |
| Governorship change | — | ▼1 | ▲1 |
| Party | Republicanos | PP | PSD |
| Governors | 2 | 2 | 2 |
| Governorship change | ▲1 | — | — |

Gubernatorial elections were held in Brazil on 2 October 2022 as part of the nationwide general elections to elect tickets with state governors and their vice governors (as well as the Governor of the Federal District and their vice governor). A second round was held on 30 October for states where no candidate was able to secure more than half of the votes in the first round.

== Background ==
The behind-the-scenes run for governor in the state began after the 2020 Brazilian municipal elections, According to Brazilian electoral law, no one candidate can be declared before July 2022, until then all quoted persons to be candidates are called pre-candidates or potential candidates.

== Overview ==
2022 Brazilian gubernatorial elections
| State | Outgoing Governor | | Winner | | % | Leading opponent | | % | References |
| State | Name | Party | Name | Party | % | Name | Party | % | References |
|---|---|---|---|---|---|---|---|---|---|
| AC | Gladson Cameli | PP | Gladson Cameli; Reelected in the 1st round | PP | 56.75% | Jorge Viana | PT | 24.21% | |
| AL | Paulo Dantas | MDB | Paulo Dantas; Reelected in the 2nd round | MDB | 52.33% | Rodrigo Cunha | UNIÃO | 47.67% | |
| AP | Waldez Góes | PDT | Clécio Luís; Elected in the 1st round | SD | 53.69% | Jaime Nunes | PSD | 42.58% | |
| AM | Wilson Lima | UNIÃO | Wilson Lima; Reelected in the 2nd round | UNIÃO | 56.65% | Eduardo Braga | MDB | 43.35% | |
| BA | Rui Costa | PT | Jerônimo Rodrigues; Elected in the 2nd round | PT | 52.79% | ACM Neto | UNIÃO | 47.21% | |
| CE | Izolda Cela | No Party | Elmano de Freitas; Elected in the 1st round | PT | 54.02% | Capitão Wagner | UNIÃO | 31.72% | |
| ES | Renato Casagrande | PSB | Renato Casagrande; Reelected in the 2nd round | PSB | 53.80% | Carlos Manato | PL | 46.20% | |
| DF | Ibaneis Rocha | MDB | Ibaneis Rocha; Reelected in the 1st round | MDB | 50.31% | Leandro Grass | PV | 26.26% | |
| GO | Ronaldo Caiado | UNIÃO | Ronaldo Caiado; Reelected in the 1st round | UNIÃO | 51.81% | Gustavo Mendanha | PATRI | 25.20% | |
| MA | Carlos Brandão | PSB | Carlos Brandão; Reelected in the 1st round | PSB | 51.29% | Lahesio Bonfim | PSC | 24.87% | |
| MT | Mauro Mendes | UNIÃO | Mauro Mendes; Reelected in the 1st round | UNIÃO | 68.45% | Marcia Pinheiro | PV | 16.41% | |
| MS | Reinaldo Azambuja | PSDB | Eduardo Riedel; Elected in the 2nd round | PSDB | 56.90% | Capitão Contar | PRTB | 43.10% | |
| MG | Romeu Zema | NOVO | Romeu Zema; Reelected in the 1st round | NOVO | 56.18% | Alexandre Kalil | PSD | 35.08% | |
| PR | Ratinho Júnior | PSD | Ratinho Júnior; Reelected in the 1st round | PSD | 69.64% | Roberto Requião | PT | 26.23% | |
| PB | João Azevêdo | PSB | João Azevêdo; Reelected in the 2nd round | PSB | 52.51% | Pedro Cunha Lima | PSDB | 47.49% | |
| PA | Helder Barbalho | MDB | Helder Barbalho; Reelected in the 1st round | MDB | 70.41% | Zequinha Marinho | PL | 27.13% | |
| PE | Paulo Câmara | PSB | Raquel Lyra; Elected in the 2nd round | PSDB | 58.70% | Marília Arraes | SD | 41.30% | |
| PI | Regina Sousa | PT | Rafael Fonteles; Elected in the 1st round | PT | 57.17% | Sílvio Mendes | UNIÃO | 41.62% | |
| RJ | Cláudio Castro | PL | Cláudio Castro; Reelected in the 1st round | PL | 58.67% | Marcelo Freixo | PSB | 27.38% | |
| RN | Fátima Bezerra | PT | Fátima Bezerra; Reelected in the 1st round | PT | 58.31% | Fábio Dantas | SD | 22,22% | |
| RS | Ranolfo Vieira Júnior | PSDB | Eduardo Leite; Reelected in the 2nd round | PSDB | 57.12% | Onyx Lorenzoni | PL | 42.88% | |
| RO | Marcos Rocha | UNIÃO | Marcos Rocha; Reelected in the 2nd round | UNIÃO | 52.47% | Marcos Rogério | PL | 47.53% | |
| RR | Antonio Denarium | PP | Antonio Denarium; Reelected in the 1st round | PP | 56.47% | Teresa Surita | MDB | 41.14% | |
| SC | Carlos Moisés | REP | Jorginho Mello; Elected in the 2nd round | PL | 70.69% | Décio Lima | PT | 29.31% | |
| SP | Rodrigo Garcia | PSDB | Tarcísio de Freitas; Elected in the 2nd round | REP | 55.27% | Fernando Haddad | PT | 44.73% | |
| SE | Belivaldo Chagas | PSD | Fábio Mitidieri; Elected in the 2nd round | PSD | 51.70% | Rogério Carvalho Santos | PT | 48.30% | |
| TO | Wanderlei Barbosa | REP | Wanderlei Barbosa; Reelected in the 1st round | REP | 58.14% | Ronaldo Dimas | PL | 22.50% | |

== North ==
2022 Acre gubernatorial election
- 2 October 2022
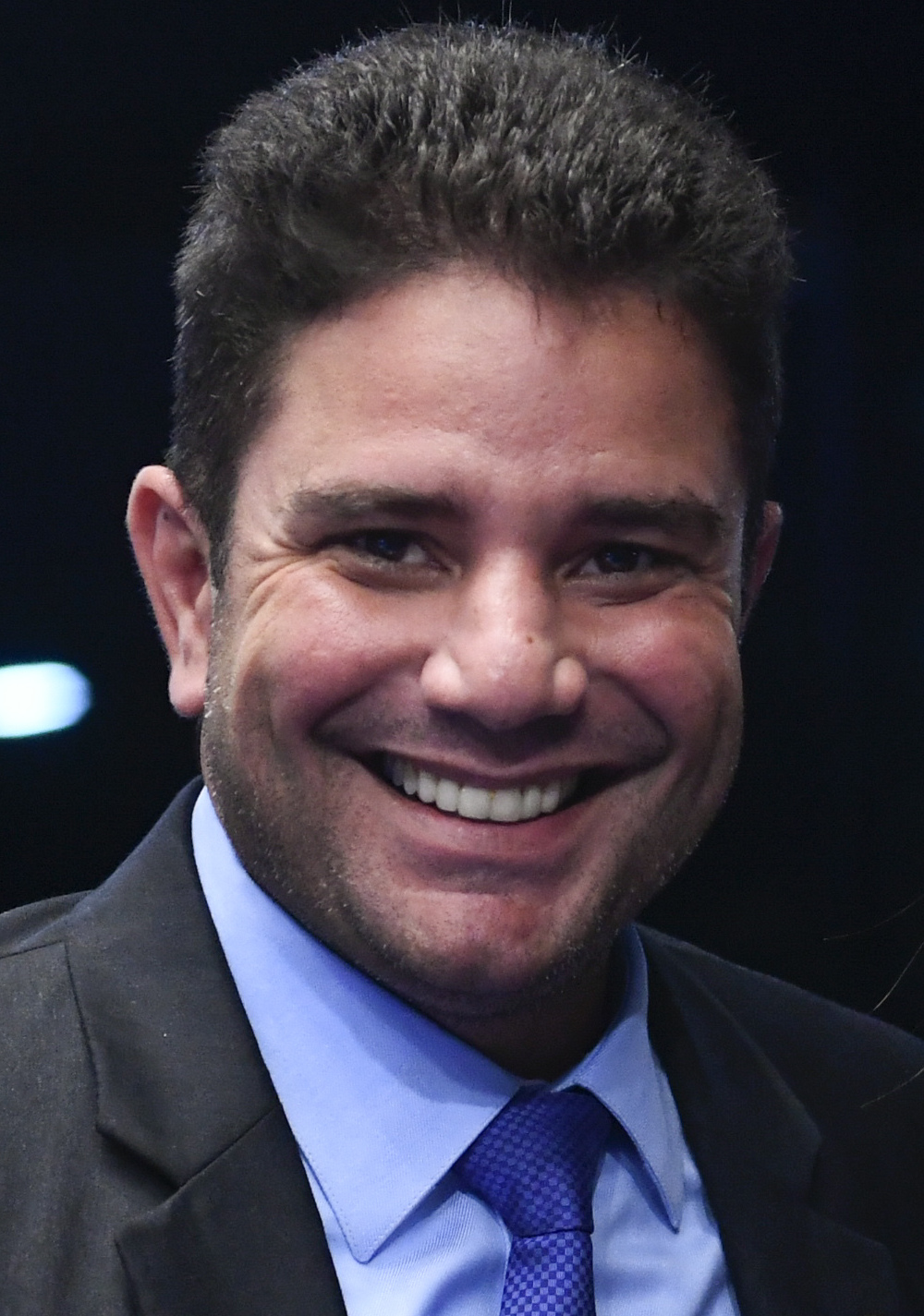

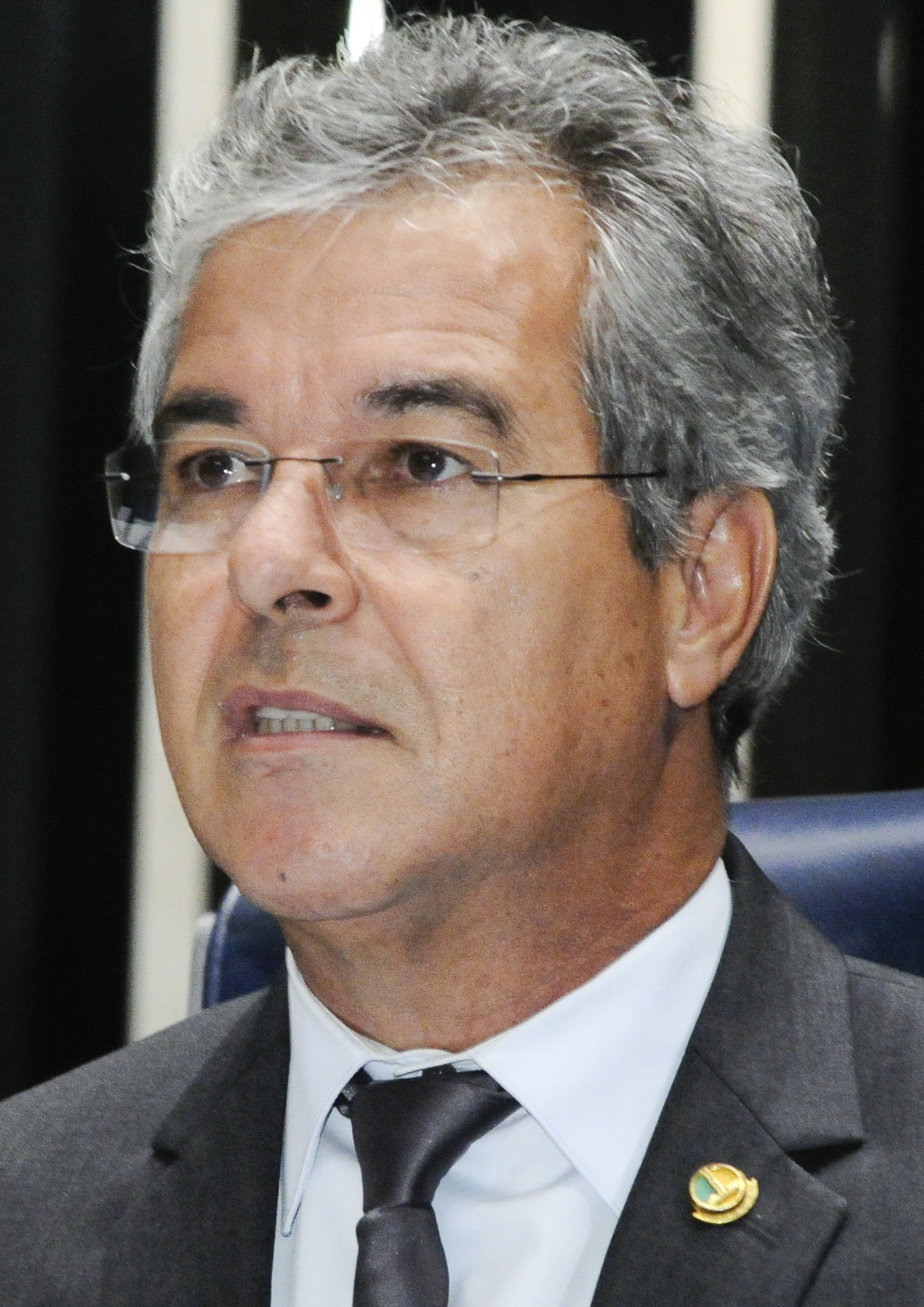

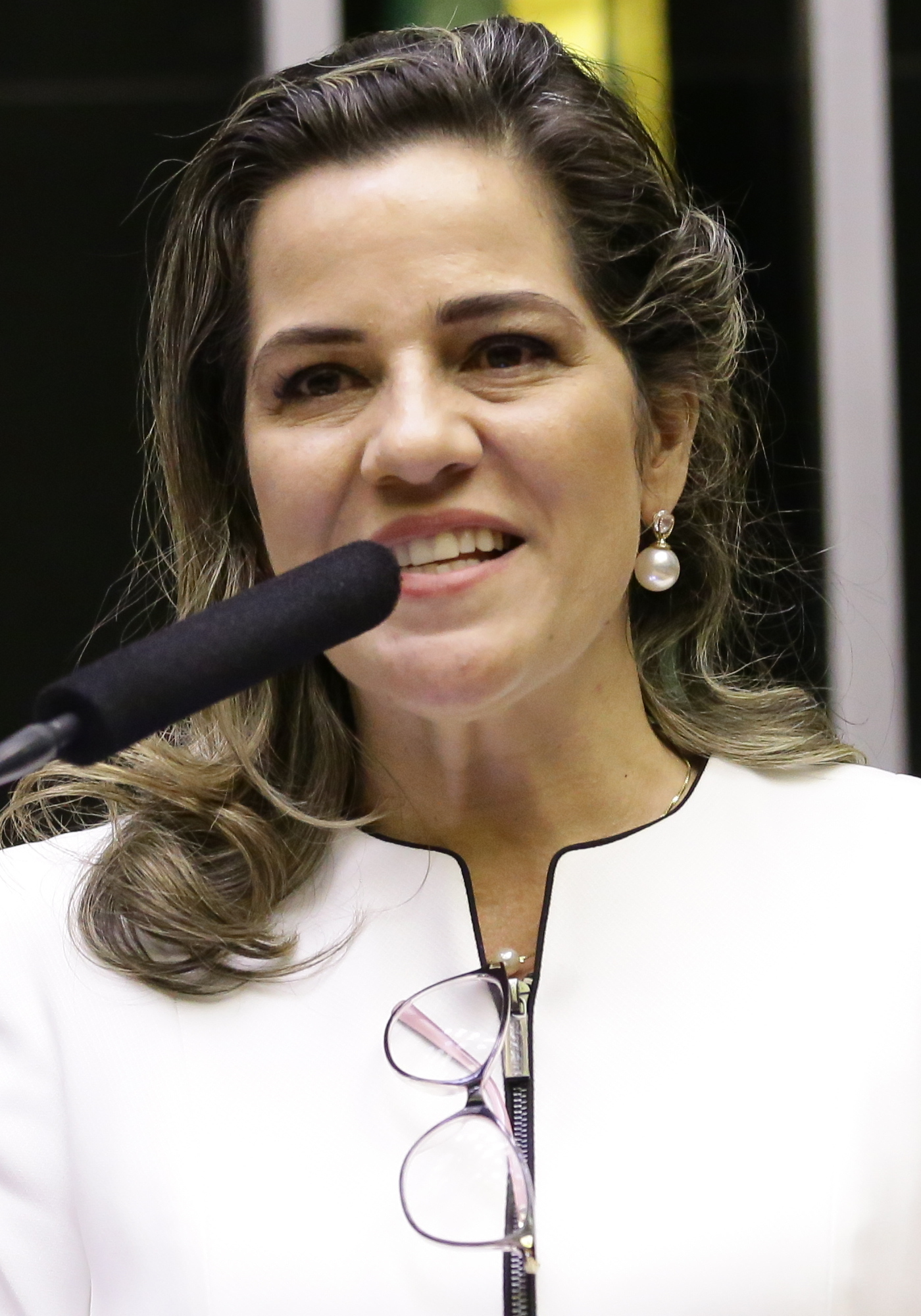
| Candidate | Gladson Cameli | Jorge Viana | Mara Rocha |
| Party | PP | PT | MDB |
| Alliance | Advance to do more | Brazil of Hope | Hope for a Better Acre Starts Now! |
| Running mate | Mailza Gomes | Marcus Alexandre | Fernando Alvares Zamora |
| Popular vote | 242,100 | 103,265 | 47,173 |
| Percentage | 56.75% | 24.21% | 11.06% |
- Most voted candidate by municipality (22): Glason Cameli (20) Jorge Viana (2)

=== Acre ===
In Acre, incumbent Governor Gladson Cameli was reelected in the first round with 56.75% of the vote.

==== 2018 election ====
In 2018, Glason Cameli, a former senator for Acre and civil engineer affiliated with the Progressistas, was elected governor with 53.71% of the vote against Workers' Party candidate Marcus Alexandre and Social Liberal Party candidate Coronel Ulysses in the first round. Cameli, a supporter of President Jair Bolsonaro, broke the rule of the PT in Acre after 20 years.

He was elected along with his Vice-Governor Wherles Fernandes da Rocha, also known as Major Rocha, a member of the Brazilian Social Democracy Party. Rocha during his tenure switched to the Social Liberal Party, the Brazil Union, and then the Brazilian Democratic Movement, a party which opposed Cameli in the 2022 election.

==== Operation Ptolemy ====
Cameli's first term saw a corruption investigation called Operation Ptolemy in 2021, in which the Federal Police investigated criminal organizations in Acre. Though Cameli has not been specifically targeted, the police seized some of Cameli's possessions, banned his international travel, and seized his passport. The police are also investigating his father Eladio Cameli and his brother Gledson Cameli. Overall the Federal Police found that at least 268.6 million reals in public funds had been stolen by the criminal organizations in fraudulent public contracts, but have not implicated Cameli.

Given no charge in the investigation prohibited his candidacy by the Superior Electoral Court or by the Ficha Limpa, which bans politicians convicted by a court, impeached, or resigned to avoid impeachment of running for eight years, Cameli was able to run for reelection.

==== Candidates ====
The election saw all three incumbent senators for Acre run, either for governor or vice governor. The candidates were as follows:

- Gladson Cameli (PP), the incumbent governor, ran for reelection along with Maliza Gomes (PP) as vice governor. Gomes served as Cameli's alternate in the 2014 elections where he was elected senator and then as senator once Cameli was elected governor from 2019-2022. She was replaced by Bispo José (PL). Cameli's coalition "Advance to do more" was made up of the PP, PDT, Always Forward (PSDB, CID), PODE, SD, PATRI, PMN, DC, and PMB.
- Jorge Viana (PT), a forestry engineer, who served as Mayor of Rio Branco from 1993 to 1997, Governor of Acre from 1999 to 2007, and Senator for Acre from 2011 to 2019, ran along with Marcus Alexandre (PT) for vice governor, the previous challenger to Cameli. Viana's coalition was made up of the Brazil of Hope Federation (PT, PV, and PCdoB).
- Mara Rocha (MDB), a Federal Deputy and sister of Cameli's first vice governor Major Rocha, ran along with Fernando Alvares Zamora (PRTB), an agricultural producer for vice governor. Her coalition "Hope for a Better Acre Starts Now!" was composed of the MDB, PRTB, REP, and PL.
- Sérgio de Oliveira Cunha (PSD) also known as Petecão, a Senator for Acre first elected in 2010, who formerly served as President of the Legislative Assembly of Acre and as Federal Deputy, ran along with Tota Filho (PSD), an attorney from Cruzeiro do Sul. Petecão's coalition "With the Strength of the People" was composed of the PSD, AVANTE, PROS, and PTB.
- Márcio Bittar (UNIÃO), a former cattle rancher and senator first elected in 2018, who formerly served as a Federal Deputy, ran along with Dr. Georgia Micheletti (UNIÃO) for vice governor. Bittar's coalition was only made up of the Brazil Union, a party founded in 2021 as a union between the Democrats and Social Liberal Party, though Bittar was elected senator as a member of the MDB.
- Professor Nilson (PSOL), a college professor, ran along with Jane Rosas (PSOL), a business administrator. The coalition was made up of the PSOL REDE Federation of the Socialism and Liberty Party and the Sustainability Network.
- David Hall (AGIR), a high school teacher, ran along with Jorgiene Carneiro (AGIR). Their party Act or Agir in Portuguese ran an isolated ticket. The party was previously the Christian Labor Party and the National Reconstruction Party of the victorious Fernando Collor de Melo in 1989 elections.

==== Results ====
| Candidate | Running mate | Party | Votes | % |
|---|---|---|---|---|
| Gladson Cameli (incumbent) | Mailza Gomes | PP | 242,100 | 56.75 |
| Jorge Viana | Marcus Alexandre | PT | 103,265 | 24.21 |
| Mara Rocha | Fernando Zamora | MDB | 47,173 | 11.06 |
| Sérgio Petecão | Tota Filho | PSD | 27,393 | 6.42 |
| Márcio Bittar | Georgia Micheletti | UNIÃO | 4,773 | 1.12 |
| Nilson Euclides | Jane Rosas | PSOL | 1,125 | 0.26 |
| David Hall | Jorgiene Carneiro | Agir | 771 | 0.18 |
| Total | | | 426,600 | 100.00 |
| Valid votes | | | 426,600 | 93.67 |
| Invalid votes | | | 21,077 | 4.63 |
| Blank votes | | | 7,761 | 1.70 |
| Total votes | | | 455,438 | 100.00 |
| Registered voters/turnout | | | 587,222 | 77.56 |
| PP hold | | | | |

2022 Amazonas gubernatorial election
- 2 October 2022
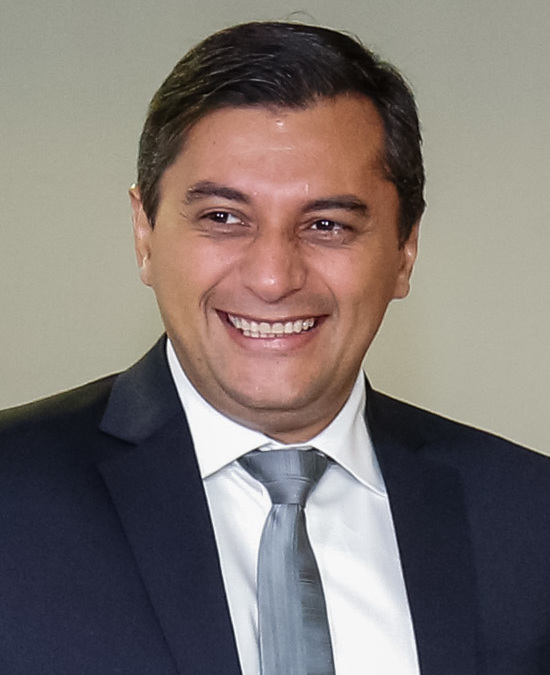

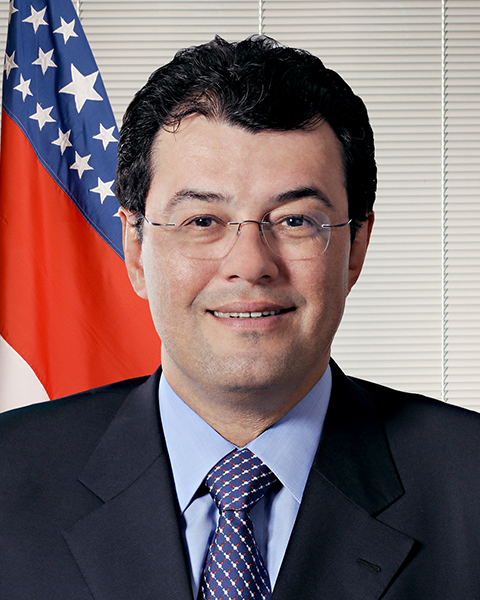
| Candidate | Wilson Lima | Eduardo Braga |
| Party | UNIÃO | MDB |
| Alliance | Here is Work | In Defense of Life |
| Running mate | Tadeu de Souza | Anne Moura |
| Popular vote | 1,039,192 | 795,098 |
| Percentage | 56.65% | 43.35% |
- Most voted candidate by municipality (22): Wilson Lima (34) Eduardo Braga (28)

=== Amazonas ===
In Amazonas, incumbent governor Wilson Lima was re-elected in the second round against former governor Eduardo Braga with 56.65% to Braga's 43.35%

==== 2018 ====
In 2018, Wilson Lima, a reporter and TV presenter most known for the program Alô Amazonas, was elected in the second round against incumbent governor Amazonino Mendes 58.50% to 41.50%. Lima, a supporter of Jair Bolsonaro, ran as a member of the Social Christian Party, a minor evangelical conservative movement. Mendes had been elected in 2017 in the supplementary elections after the impeachment of José Melo de Oliveira, who was elected in 2014.

Lima's Lt. Governor in 2018 was Carlos Almeida, a public defender affiliated with the right wing nationalist Brazilian Labor Renewal Party (PRTB). Almeida, having joined the Brazilian Labor Party (PTB), broke with Lima in 2020 over his handling of the COVID-19 pandemic in Amazonas, believing that Lima's enforcement of the Bolsonaro administration's Herd immunity policy was wrong. Almeida subsequently joined the Brazilian Social Democracy Party, which opposed Lima in the 2022 election.

Lima joined the Brazil Union (UNIÃO), a merger of the former Christian democratic Democrats (DEM) and conservative liberal Social Liberal Party (PSL), for the election.

==== Candidates ====
The election saw two former governors run, along with the incumbent. The candidates were as follows:

- Wilson Lima (UNIÃO), the incumbent governor, ran for reelection along with Tadeu de Souza (AVANTE) as vice governor. Souza, a lawyer and close ally of the Manaus Mayor David Almeida, served as Lima's chief of staff from 2021 to 2022, after serving in the bureaucracy of Manaus. Lima was endorsed by Jair Bolsonaro in the second round, but Lima outperformed Bolsonaro by 6 points. Lima's coalition "Here is Work" was made up of the UNIÃO, AVANTE, PL, PTB, PATRI, PMN, PRTB, PSC, REP and PP.
- Eduardo Braga (MDB), an entrepreneur and long time politician, who served as Mayor of Manaus from 1994 to 1997, Governor of Amazonas from 2003 to 2010, Senator for Amazonas from 2011 to present, and Minister of Mines and Energy in the Rousseff administration, ran along with Anne Moura (PT) for vice governor, the National Secretary for Women of the Worker's Party. He was endorsed by Luiz Inácio Lula da Silva. Braga's coalition was made up of the MDB, Brazil of Hope Federation (PT, PV, and PCdoB), and PSD.
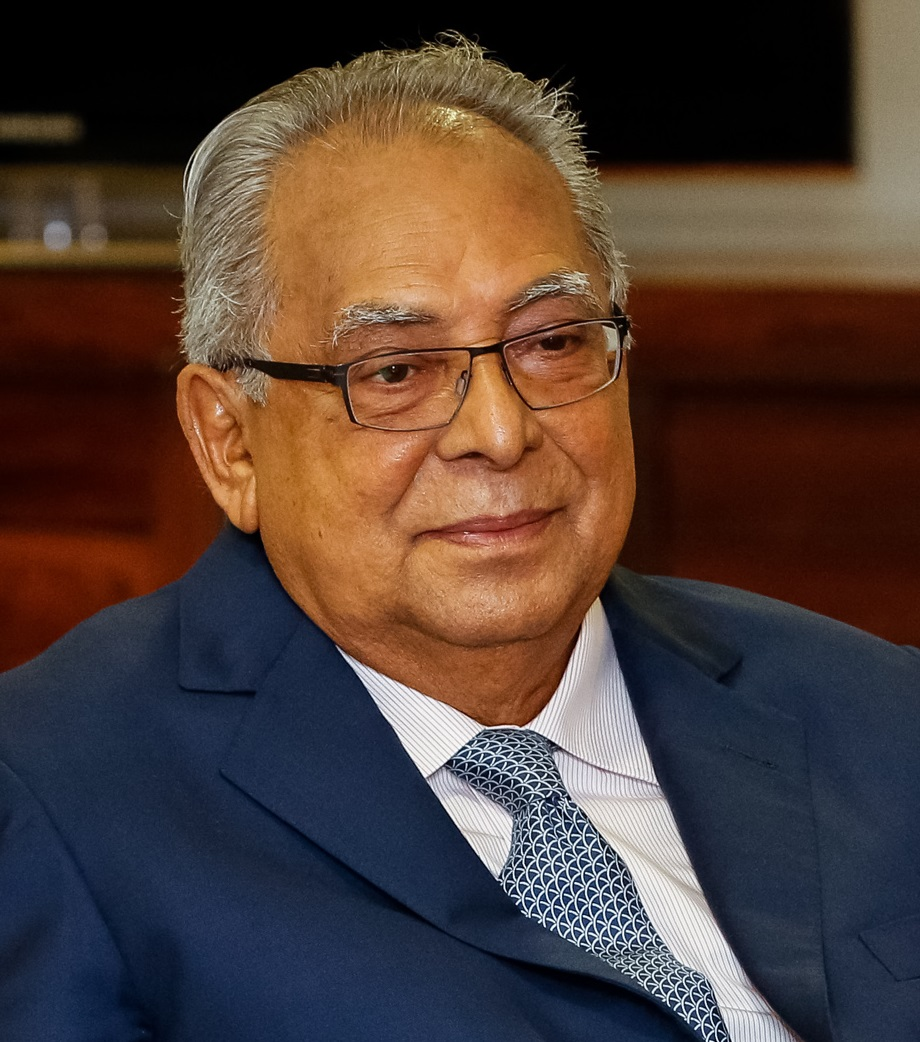
  Amazonino Mendes, a former governor and mayor of Manaus, came third in the election. He died on 12 February 2023 at 83.
- Amazonino Mendes (CID), the 41st, 44th, and 48th Governor of Amazonas, who also served as a Senator from 1991 to 1993 and the 64th, 67th, and 71st Mayor of Manaus, ran along with Beto Michiles (PSDB), a former Federal Deputy for vice governor. Mendes ran without a coalition except for the party federation Always Forward made up of his party Cidadania and the Brazilian Social Democracy Party.
- Ricardo Nicolau (SD), a hospital administrator and five time State Deputy in Amazonas, who formerly served as President of the Legislative Assembly of Amazonas and as City Councillor of Manaus, ran along with Cristiane Balieiro (PSB), a teacher. Nicolau's campaign focused on his health background and building more hospitals. Nicolau's coalition "We, the People" was composed of Solidarity and the Brazilian Socialist Party.
- Carol Braz (PDT), a lawyer, former judge, and Secretary of State for Justice, Human Rights, and Citizenship, who formerly served as president of the PSC in Manaus before leaving the party, ran along with Claudio Machado (PDT), an engineer, for vice governor. Braz had no coalition.
- Dr Israel Tuyuka (PSOL), an indigenous doctor and teacher from the Tuyuca ethnic group near Colombia, ran along with Thomaz Barbosa (PSOL), a radio announcer. Tuyuka ran without a coalition except for the PSOL REDE Federation of the Socialism and Liberty Party and the Sustainibility Network.
- Henrique Oliveira (PODE), a radio presenter who previously served as the vice governor of Amazonino Mendes from 2017 to 2019 and a Federal Deputy from 2011 to 2015, ran alongside Edward Malta (PROS), a businessman and state president of PROS. Oliveira's coalition "Amazonas Wants More" was made up of PODE and PROS.
- Nair Blair (AGIR), a businesswoman, ran along with Rita Nobre (AGIR), a dental surgeon. Their party Act or Agir in Portuguese ran an isolated ticket. Blair previously was elected but not charged in the investigation of the electoral crimes of former governor José Melo de Oliveira. The party was previously the Christian Labor Party and the National Reconstruction Party of the victorious Fernando Collor de Melo in 1989 elections.

==== Results ====
| Candidate | Running mate | Party | First round | | Second round | |
| Candidate | Running mate | Party | Votes | % | Votes | % |
|---|---|---|---|---|---|---|
| Wilson Lima (incumbent) | Tadeu de Souza (AVANTE) | UNIÃO | 819,784 | 42.82 | 1,039,192 | 56.65 |
| Eduardo Braga | Anne Moura (PT) | MDB | 401,817 | 20.99 | 795,089 | 43.35 |
| Amazonino Mendes | Beto Michiles (PSDB) | CID | 355,377 | 18.56 | | |
| Ricardo Nicolau | Cristiane Balieiro (PSB) | SD | 217,588 | 11.37 | | |
| Carol Braz | Engenheiro Machadão | PDT | 87,114 | 4.55 | | |
| Dr. Israel Tuyuka | Thomaz Barbosa | PSOL | 21,229 | 1.11 | | |
| Henrique Oliveira | Edward Malta (PROS) | PODE | 9,596 | 0.50 | | |
| Nair Blair | Rita Nobre | AGIR | 1,895 | 0.10 | | |
| Total | | | 1,914,400 | 100.00 | 1,834,281 | 100.00 |
| Valid votes | | | 1,914,400 | 90.69 | 1,834,281 | 88.82 |
| Invalid votes | | | 138,218 | 6.55 | 157,882 | 7.65 |
| Blank votes | | | 58,257 | 2.76 | 72,907 | 3.53 |
| Total votes | | | 2,110,875 | 100.00 | 2,065,070 | 100.00 |
| Registered voters/turnout | | | 2,643,487 | 79.85 | 2,643,781 | 78.11 |
| UNIÃO hold | | | | | | |
Source: Superior Electoral Court

=== Rôndonia ===
| Candidate | Running mate | Party | First round | | Second round | |
| Candidate | Running mate | Party | Votes | % | Votes | % |
|---|---|---|---|---|---|---|
| Marcos Rocha (incumbent) | Sérgio Gonçalves | UNIÃO | 330,656 | 38.88 | 458,370 | 52.47 |
| Marcos Rogério | Flávia Lenzi | PL | 315,035 | 37.05 | 415,278 | 47.53 |
| Léo Moraes | Rildo Flores (PSD) | PODE | 119,583 | 14.06 | | |
| Daniel Pereira | Anselmo de Jesus (PT) | SD | 81,421 | 9.57 | | |
| Nascimento da Silva | Michele Tolentino | PSOL | 3,660 | 0.43 | | |
| Total | | | 850,355 | 100.00 | 873,648 | 100.00 |
| Valid votes | | | 850,355 | 91.85 | 873,648 | 94.39 |
| Invalid votes | | | 44,643 | 4.82 | 31,812 | 3.44 |
| Blank votes | | | 30,765 | 3.32 | 20,103 | 2.17 |
| Total votes | | | 925,763 | 100.00 | 925,563 | 100.00 |
| Registered voters/turnout | | | 1,230,987 | 75.20 | 1,230,987 | 75.19 |
| UNIÃO hold | | | | | | |

=== Roraima ===
| Candidate | Running mate | Party | Votes | % |
|---|---|---|---|---|
| Antônio Denarium (incumbent) | Edilson Damião (REP) | PP | 163,167 | 56.47 |
| Teresa Surita | Édio Lopes (PL) | MDB | 118,856 | 41.14 |
| Fábio Almeida | Francisco Wapichana | PSOL | 3,843 | 1.33 |
| Juraci Francisco | Lia Michelli | PDT | 1,878 | 0.65 |
| Rudson Leite | Cristina Burger | PV | 1,189 | 0.41 |
| Total | | | 288,933 | 100.00 |
| Valid votes | | | 288,933 | 94.94 |
| Invalid votes | | | 12,357 | 4.06 |
| Blank votes | | | 3,029 | 1.00 |
| Total votes | | | 304,319 | 100.00 |
| Registered voters/turnout | | | 365,395 | 83.28 |

=== Pará ===
| Candidate | Running mate | Party | Votes | % |
|---|---|---|---|---|
| Helder Barbalho (incumbent) | Hana Ghassan | MDB | 3,117,279 | 70.41 |
| Zequinha Marinho | Rosiane Eguchi (PSC) | PL | 1,201,079 | 27.13 |
| Adolfo Oliveira | Vera Rodrigues | PSOL | 56,830 | 1.28 |
| Felipe Augusto | Fernando Dourado | PRTB | 31,402 | 0.71 |
| Leonardo Marcony | Nilo Noronha | SD | 9,103 | 0.21 |
| Sofia Couto | Luciano Sewnarine | PMB | 5,355 | 0.12 |
| Cleber Rabelo | Benedita do Amaral | PSTU | 5,053 | 0.11 |
| Paulo Roseira | Murilo Monteiro | AGIR | 1,309 | 0.03 |
| Total | | | 4,427,410 | 100.00 |
| Valid votes | | | 4,427,410 | 92.52 |
| Invalid votes | | | 258,639 | 5.40 |
| Blank votes | | | 99,146 | 2.07 |
| Total votes | | | 4,785,195 | 100.00 |
| Registered voters/turnout | | | 6,082,312 | 78.67 |
| MDB hold | | | | |

=== Amapá ===
| Candidate | Running mate | Party | Votes | % |
|---|---|---|---|---|
| Clécio Luís | Teles Junior (PDT) | SD | 222,168 | 53.77 |
| Jaime Nunes | Liliane Albuquerque | PSD | 176,208 | 42.65 |
| Gesiel de Oliveira | Alis Vanzeler | PRTB | 8,704 | 2.11 |
| Gilvam Borges | Helêne Camilo | MDB | 4,510 | 1.09 |
| Gianfranco Gusmão | Ana Paula | PSTU | 1,588 | 0.38 |
| Jairo Palheta | Eliana Brandão | PCO | 634 | |
| Total | | | 413,178 | 100.00 |
| Valid votes | | | 413,178 | 93.46 |
| Invalid votes | | | 22,429 | 5.07 |
| Blank votes | | | 6,494 | 1.47 |
| Total votes | | | 442,101 | 100.00 |
| Registered voters/turnout | | | 550,697 | 80.28 |
| SD gain from PDT | | | | |

=== Tocantins ===
| Candidate | Running mate | Party | Votes | % |
|---|---|---|---|---|
| Wanderlei Barbosa (incumbent) | Laurez Ferreira (PDT) | REP | 481,496 | 58.34 |
| Ronaldo Dimas | Freire Junior (MDB) | PL | 186,361 | 22.58 |
| Paulo Mourão | Germana Coriolano (PCdoB) | PT | 88,143 | 10.68 |
| Irajá Abreu | Lires Ferneda | PSD | 63,048 | 7.64 |
| Ricardo Macedo | Geldes Passos | PMB | 5,043 | 0.61 |
| Luciano Teixeira | Luciene Mamedes | DC | 1,232 | 0.15 |
| Carmen Hannud | Antonio Costa | PCO | 384 | |
| Total | | | 825,323 | 100.00 |
| Valid votes | | | 825,323 | 92.99 |
| Invalid votes | | | 39,198 | 4.42 |
| Blank votes | | | 23,065 | 2.60 |
| Total votes | | | 887,586 | 100.00 |
| Registered voters/turnout | | | 1,092,229 | 81.26 |
| Republicanos hold | | | | |

== Northeast ==
=== Maranhão ===
| Candidate | Running mate | Party | Votes | % |
|---|---|---|---|---|
| Carlos Brandão (incumbent) | Felipe Camarão (PT) | PSB | 1,769,187 | 51.29 |
| Lahesio Bonfim | Gutemberg Fernandes | PSC | 857,744 | 24.87 |
| Weverton Rocha | Hélio Soares (PL) | PDT | 714,352 | 20.71 |
| Edivaldo Holanda Júnior | Andrea Heringer | PSD | 86,573 | 2.51 |
| Enilton Rodrigues | Pedra Celestina | PSOL | 7,135 | 0.21 |
| Hertz Dias | Jayro Mesquita | PSTU | 5,191 | 0.15 |
| Simplício Araújo | Marly Tavares | SD | 5,009 | 0.15 |
| Joás Moraes | Ricardo Medeiros | DC | 2,310 | 0.07 |
| Frankle Costa | José Pereira | PCB | 1,889 | 0.05 |
| Total | | | 3,449,390 | 100.00 |
| Valid votes | | | 3,449,390 | 88.03 |
| Invalid votes | | | 348,048 | 8.88 |
| Blank votes | | | 120,774 | 3.08 |
| Total votes | | | 3,918,212 | 100.00 |
| Registered voters/turnout | | | 5,036,730 | 77.79 |
| PSB hold | | | | |

=== Piauí ===
| Candidate | Running mate | Party | Votes | % |
|---|---|---|---|---|
| Rafael Fonteles | Themístocles Filho (MDB) | PT | 1,115,139 | 57.62 |
| Silvio Mendes | Iracema Portella (PP) | UNIÃO | 811,806 | 41.95 |
| Gessy Lima | Rogério Ribeiro | PSC | 13,209 | |
| Madalena Nunes | Cynthia Falcão | PSOL | 4,729 | 0.24 |
| Lourdes Melo | Cloves José | PCO | 1,924 | |
| Geraldo Carvalho | Geracina Rebouças | PSTU | 1,425 | 0.07 |
| Ravena Castro | Erivelton Quixaba | PMN | 1,167 | 0.06 |
| Gustavo Henrique | Domingos Bezerra | PATRI | 1,027 | 0.05 |
| Total | | | 1,935,293 | 100.00 |
| Valid votes | | | 1,935,293 | 91.55 |
| Invalid votes | | | 124,520 | 5.89 |
| Blank votes | | | 54,163 | 2.56 |
| Total votes | | | 2,113,976 | 100.00 |
| Registered voters/turnout | | | 2,456,056 | 86.07 |
| PT hold | | | | |

=== Ceará ===
In Ceará, Elmano de Freitas, a State Deputy from the Workers' Party, with 54.02% defeated Capitão Wagner, a Federal Deputy from the Brazil Union, who received 31.72%, and Roberto Cláudio, former mayor of Fortaleza from the Democratic Labor Party, who received 14.14%, in the first round.

| Candidate | Running mate | Party | Votes | % |
|---|---|---|---|---|
| Elmano de Freitas | Jade Romero (MDB) | PT | 2,808,300 | 54.02 |
| Wagner Sousa | Raimundo Matos (PL) | UNIÃO | 1,649,213 | 31.72 |
| Roberto Cláudio | Domingos Filho (PSD) | PDT | 734,976 | 14.14 |
| Chico Malta | Nauri Araújo | PCB | 3,015 | 0.06 |
| Serley Leal | Francisco Bita | UP | 1,881 | 0.04 |
| José Batista | Reginaldo Araújo | PSTU | 1,507 | 0.03 |
| Total | | | 5,198,892 | 100.00 |
| Valid votes | | | 5,198,892 | 92.45 |
| Invalid votes | | | 249,099 | 4.43 |
| Blank votes | | | 175,459 | 3.12 |
| Total votes | | | 5,623,450 | 100.00 |
| Registered voters/turnout | | | 6,820,673 | 82.45 |
| PT gain from PDT | | | | |

De Freitas succeeded Izolda Cela, the Lt. Governor of Camilo Santana, who had resigned to run for Senate. Santana was elected succeeding Tasso Jereissati.

2022 Rio Grande do Norte gubernatorial election
- 2 October 2022
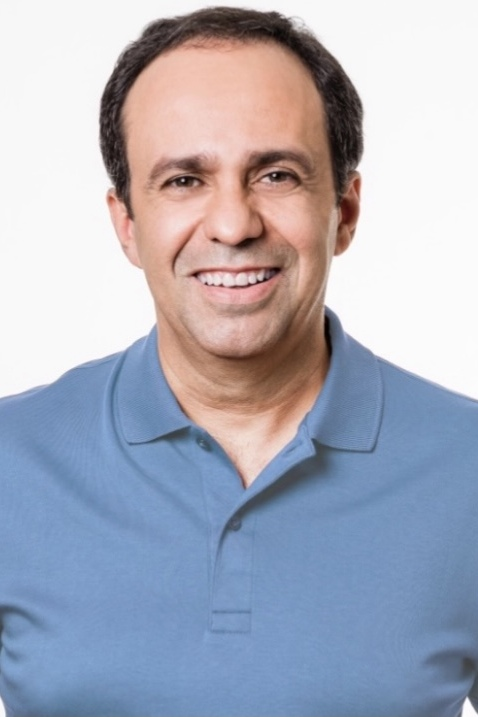

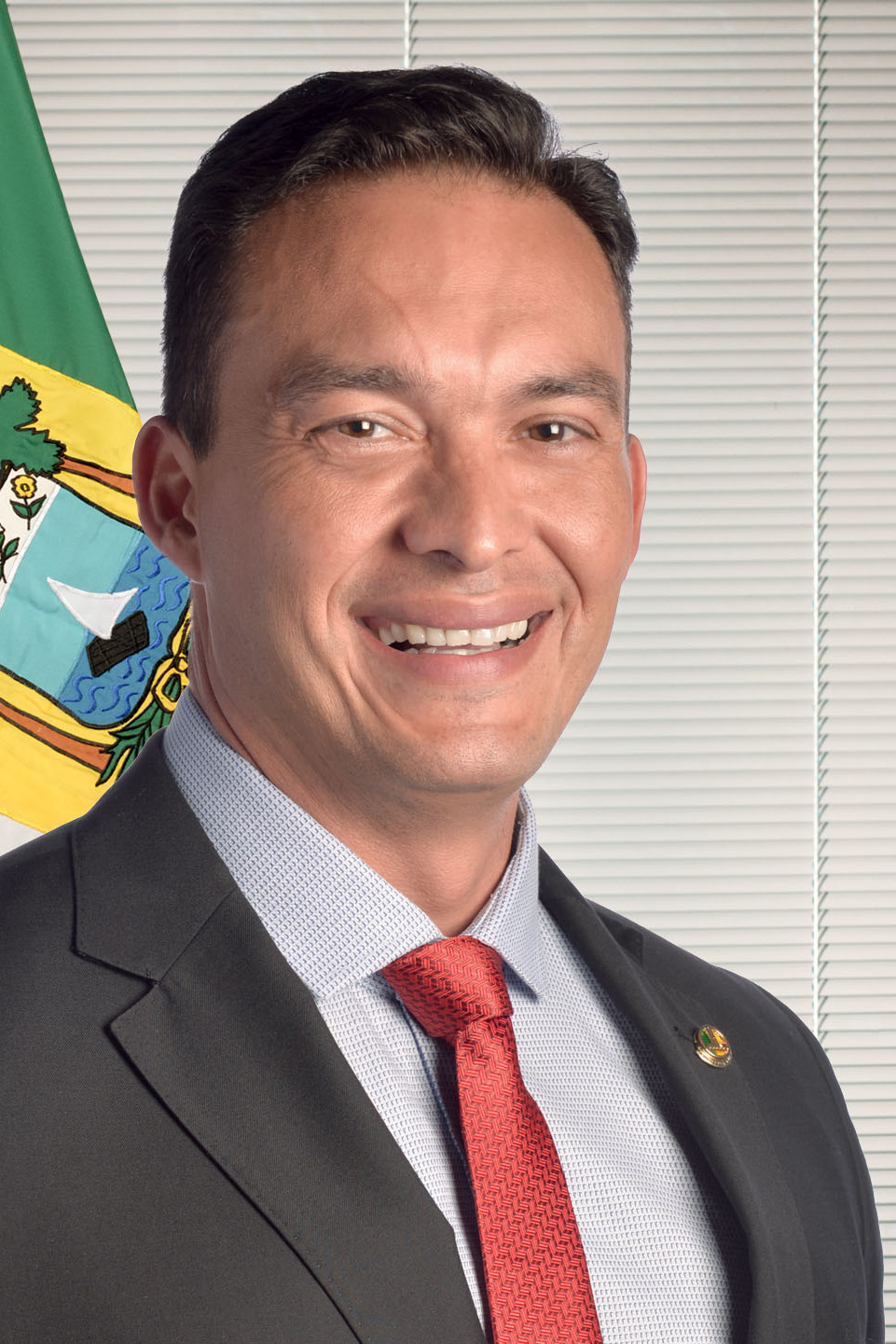
| Candidate | Fátima Bezerra | Fábio Dantas | Styvenson Valentim |
| Party | PT | Solidarity | PODE |
| Alliance | The Best Will Begin | Change RN | None |
| Running mate | Walter Alves | Ivan Júnior | Francisca Henrique |
| Popular vote | 1,066,496 | 406,461 | 307,330 |
| Percentage | 58.31% | 22.22% | 16.80% |
- Most voted candidate by municipality (167): Fátima Bezerra (158) Fábio Dantas (9)

=== Rio Grande do Norte ===
In Rio Grande do Norte, incumbent governor Fátima Bezerra was elected in the first round.

She defeated former Vice-Governor Fábio Dantas, who ran in a coalition with Rogério Simonetti Marinho, Bolsonaro's Minister of Regional Development, and incumbent senator Styvenson Valentim, elected in 2018, with 58.31% to Dantas's 22.22% and Valentim's 16.80%.

| Candidate | Running mate | Party | Votes | % |
|---|---|---|---|---|
| Fátima Bezerra (incumbent) | Walter Alves (MDB) | PT | 1,066,496 | 58.39 |
| Fábio Dantas | Ivan Junior (UNIÃO) | SD | 406,461 | 22.25 |
| Styvenson Valentim | Francisca Henrique | PODE | 307,330 | 16.83 |
| Clorisa Linhares | Erick Guerra (PATRI) | PMB | 39,011 | 2.14 |
| Danniel Morais | Ronaldo Tavares | PSOL | 3,691 | 0.20 |
| Nazareno Neris | Fernando Luiz | PMN | 1,325 | 0.07 |
| Antônio Bento | Jurandir Rosa | PRTB | 1,178 | 0.06 |
| Rodrigo Vieira | Carlos Paiva | DC | 1,045 | 0.06 |
| Total | | | 1,826,537 | 100.00 |
| Valid votes | | | 1,826,537 | 87.63 |
| Invalid votes | | | 162,027 | 7.77 |
| Blank votes | | | 95,721 | 4.59 |
| Total votes | | | 2,084,285 | 100.00 |
| Registered voters/turnout | | | 2,550,291 | 81.73 |
| PT hold | | | | |

2022 Paraíba gubernatorial election
- 2 October 2022
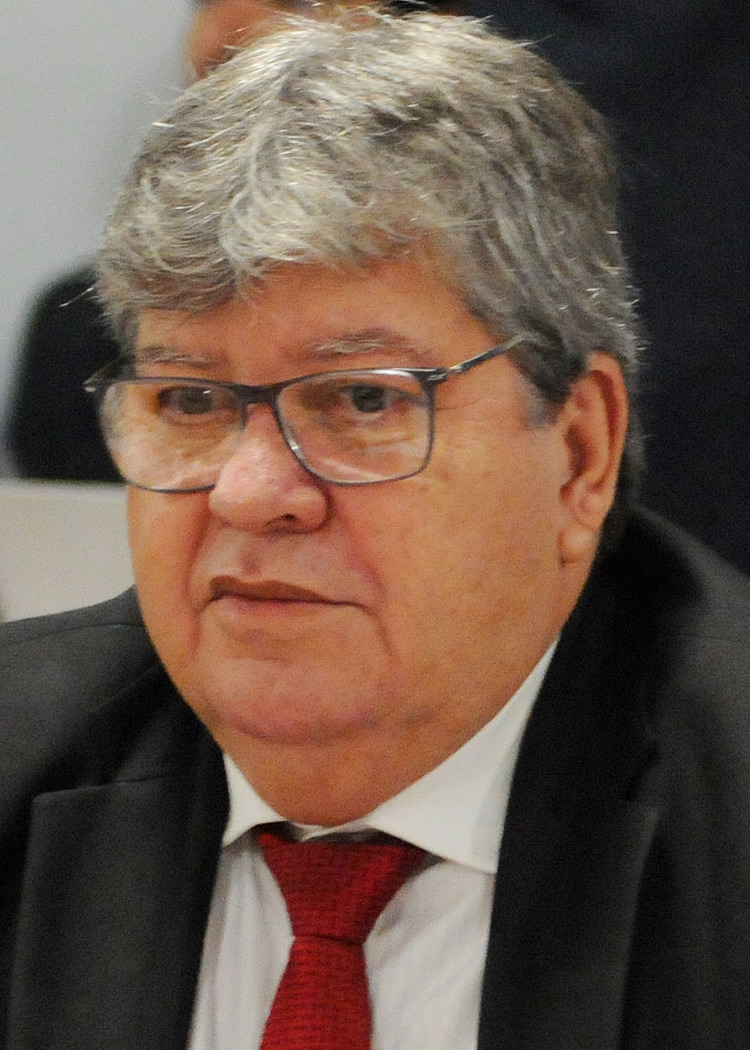

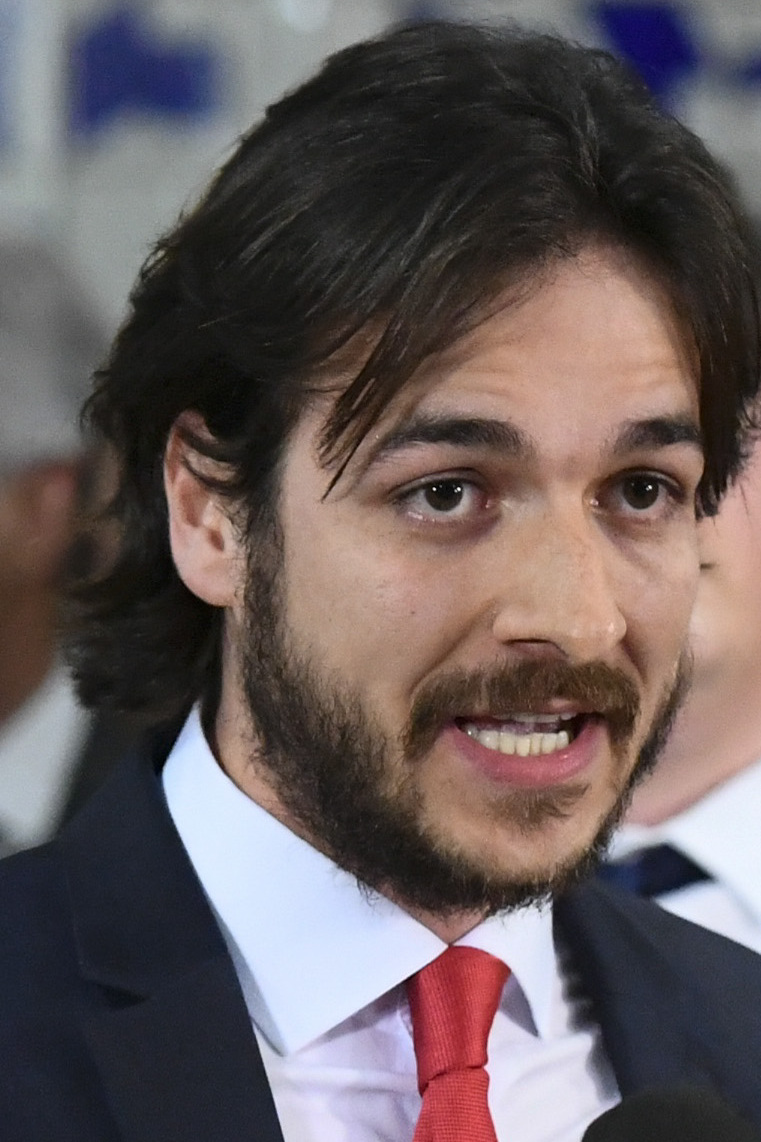
| Candidate | João Azevêdo | Pedro Cunha Lima |
| Party | PSB | PSDB |
| Alliance | Together for Paraíba | Courage to Change |
| Running mate | Lucas Ribeiro | Domiciano Cabral |
| Popular vote | 1,221,904 | 1,104,963 |
| Percentage | 52.51% | 47.49% |
- Most voted candidate by municipality (223): João Azevêdo (170) Pedro Cunha Lima (53)

=== Paraíba ===
In Paraíba, incumbent governor João Azevêdo was elected in the second round against Federal Deputy Pedro Cunha Lima with 52.51% to Lima's 47.49%.

==== Context ====
===== 2018 =====
In the 2018 gubernatorial election, Azevêdo was elected in the first round with 58.18% of all valid votes. He defeated Lucélio Cartaxo (PV), the twin brother of the mayor of the state capitol João Pessoa, Luciano Cartaxo, who received 23.41%, and Zé Maranhão (MDB), a former governor of the state, who received 17.44%.

===== Background =====
Azevêdo succeeded Ricardo Coutinho, also of the Brazilian Socialist Party. Azevêdo was elected with Lt. Governor Lígia Feliciano of the Democratic Labor Party, who also served as Coutinho's Lt. Governor for his second term.

===== Abusive Advertising =====
During the 2018 election, Lucélio Cartaxo accused Azevêdo, along with Feliciano and Coutinho, of abusive and excessive use of State institutional propaganda during the 2018 elections, which would have benefited them electorally. Each of them was ordered to pay a fine of R$5,320.50. The decision was appealed but only Feliciano avoided the fine.

===== Operation Cavalry =====
João Azevêdo is being investigated at the Superior Court of Justice for being suspected of continuing the crimes investigated by Operation Calvário, which were allegedly commanded by the former governor of the State, Ricardo Coutinho. For this case, Coutinho was arrested, but managed to get out of prison through an injunction. According to a statement from the former Secretary of State, Livânia Farias, bribes paid by the Brazilian Red Cross helped defray João Azevêdo's expenses from April 2018, a period in which he began running for state elections. The transfers would have extended until the month of July, totaling around R$480 thousand. Azevêdo stated that he never received resources from anyone for personal use and that his campaign was supported by party resources.

==== Results ====
| Candidate | Running mate | Party | First round | | Second round | |
| Candidate | Running mate | Party | Votes | % | Votes | % |
|---|---|---|---|---|---|---|
| João Azevêdo | Lucas Ribeiro (PP) | PSB | 863,174 | 39.66 | 1,221,904 | 52.51 |
| Pedro Cunha Lima | Domiciano Cabral (CID) | PSDB | 520,155 | 23.90 | 1,104,963 | 47.49 |
| Nilvan Ferreira | Artur Bolinha | PL | 406,604 | 18.68 | | |
| Veneziano Vital do Rêgo | Maísa Cartaxo (PT) | MDB | 373,511 | 17.16 | | |
| Adjany Simplício | Jardel Queiroz (UP) | PSOL | 9,567 | 0.44 | | |
| Major Fábio | Dr. Jod Candeia | PRTB | 2,455 | 0.11 | | |
| Nascimento | Alice Maciel | PSTU | 948 | 0.04 | | |
| Adriano Trajano | José Pessoa | PCO | 280 | 0.01 | | |
| Total | | | 2,176,694 | 100.00 | 2,326,867 | 100.00 |
| Valid votes | | | 2,176,694 | 85.30 | 2,326,867 | 90.57 |
| Invalid votes | | | 252,753 | 9.90 | 180,953 | 7.04 |
| Blank votes | | | 122,399 | 4.80 | 61,286 | 2.39 |
| Total votes | | | 2,551,846 | 100.00 | 2,569,106 | 100.00 |
| Registered voters/turnout | | | 3,086,030 | 82.69 | 3,086,030 | 83.25 |
| PSB hold | | | | | | |
Source: Superior Electoral Court

=== Pernambuco ===
In Pernambuco, Raquel Lyra, former mayor of Caruaru, defeated Marília Arraes, a Federal Deputy and daughter of former governor Miguel Arraes in the second round.

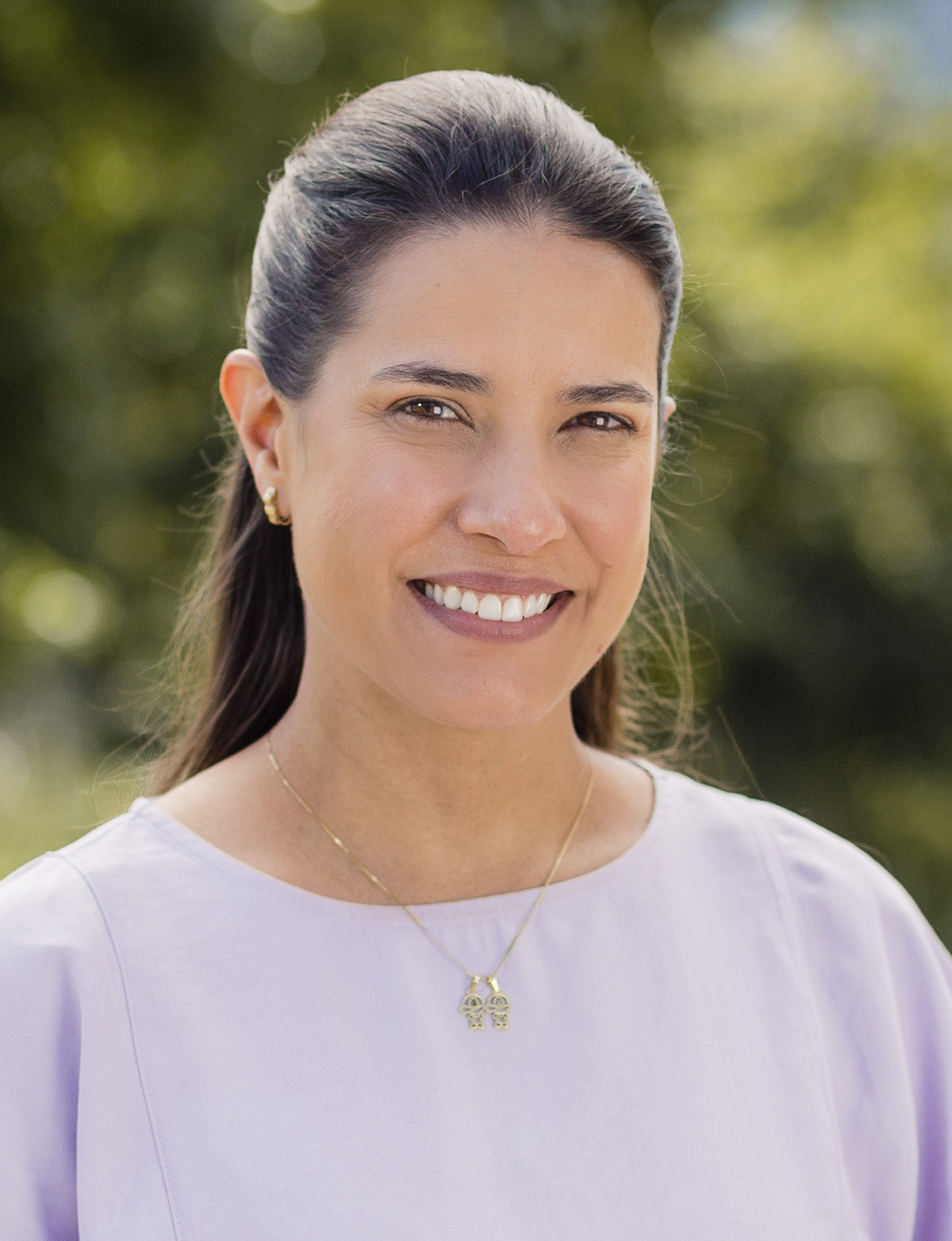
Raquel Lyra was elected governor in the second round.

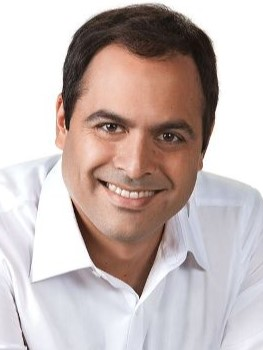
Paulo Câmara, the incumbent, was unable to run for a third term. His candidate Danilo Cabral failed to make the second round.

| Candidate | Running mate | Party | First round | | Second round | |
| Candidate | Running mate | Party | Votes | % | Votes | % |
|---|---|---|---|---|---|---|
| Raquel Lyra | Priscila Krause (CID) | PSDB | 1,009,556 | 20.58 | 3,113,415 | 58.70 |
| Marília Arraes | Sebastião Oliveira (AVANTE) | SD | 1,175,651 | 23.97 | 2,190,264 | 41.30 |
| Anderson Ferreira | Izabel Urquiza | PL | 890,220 | 18.15 | | |
| Danilo Cabral | Luciana Santos (PCdoB) | PSB | 885,994 | 18.06 | | |
| Miguel Coelho | Alessandra Vieira | UNIÃO | 884,941 | 18.04 | | |
| Jones Manoel | Raline Almeida | PCB | 33,931 | 0.69 | | |
| João Arnaldo | Alice Gabino (REDE) | PSOL | 12,558 | 0.26 | | |
| Wellington Carneiro | Carol Tosaka | PTB | 8,020 | 0.16 | | |
| Jadilson Andrade | Fernanda Souto | PMB | 2,435 | 0.05 | | |
| Claudia Ribeiro | José Mariano | PSTU | 1,745 | 0.04 | | |
| Total | | | 4,905,051 | 100.00 | 5,303,679 | 100.00 |
| Valid votes | | | 4,905,051 | 85.57 | 5,303,679 | 91.52 |
| Invalid votes | | | 543,922 | 9.49 | 377,950 | 6.52 |
| Blank votes | | | 283,316 | 4.94 | 113,730 | 1.96 |
| Total votes | | | 5,732,289 | 100.00 | 5,795,359 | 100.00 |
| Registered voters/turnout | | | 7,018,098 | 81.68 | 7,018,098 | 82.58 |
| PSDB gain from PSB | | | | | | |

=== Alagoas ===
2022 Alagoas gubernatorial election
- 2 October 2022
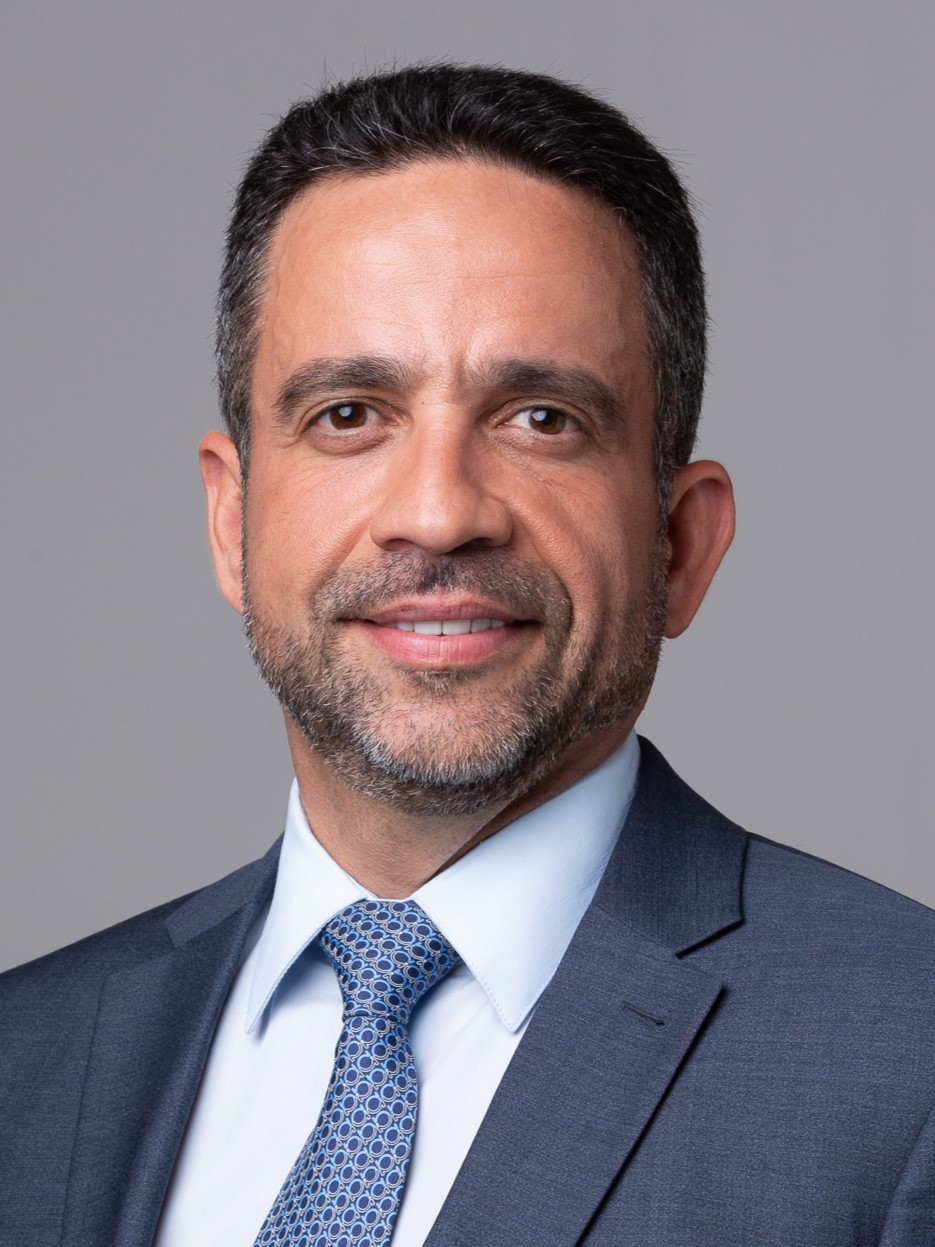

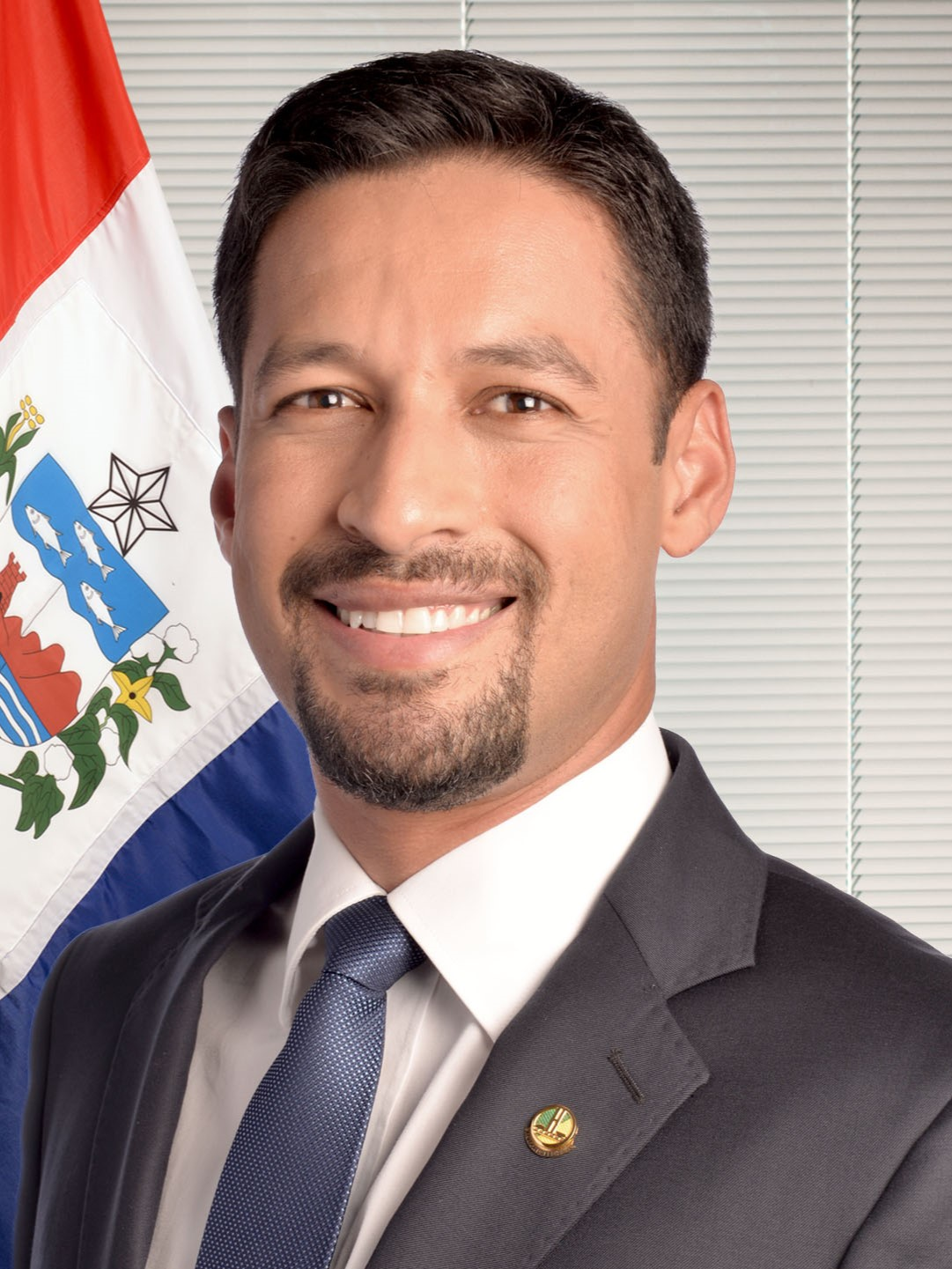
| Candidate | Paulo Dantas | Rodrigo Cunha |
| Party | MDB | UNIÃO |
| Alliance | Alagoas From Here to Better | Alagoas Deserves More |
| Running mate | Ronaldo Lessa | Jó Pereira |
| Popular vote | 834,278 | 759,984 |
| Percentage | 52.33% | 47.67% |
- Most voted candidate by municipality (102): Paulo Dantas (82) Rodrigo Cunha (20)

In Alagoas, incumbent governor Paulo Dantas, a rural business administrator who took power after the resignation of Renan Filho to run for Senate, won reelection against incumbent senator Rodrigo Cunha in the second round.

Renan Filho was elected by a wider margin than Dantas and was appointed by Luiz Inácio Lula da Silva Minister of Transport.

| Candidate | Running mate | Party | First round | | Second round | |
| Candidate | Running mate | Party | Votes | % | Votes | % |
|---|---|---|---|---|---|---|
| Paulo Dantas (incumbent) | Ronaldo Lessa (PDT) | MDB | 708,984 | 46.64 | 834,278 | 52.33 |
| Rodrigo Cunha | Jó Pereira (PSDB) | UNIÃO | 407,220 | 26.79 | 759,984 | 47.67 |
| Fernando Collor | Leonardo Dias (PL) | PTB | 223,585 | 14.71 | | |
| Rui Palmeira | Arthur Albuquerque (REP) | PSD | 157,746 | 10.38 | | |
| Cícero Albuquerque | Eliane Silva | PSOL | 17,749 | 1.17 | | |
| Luciano Fontes | Rogers Tenório | PMB | 2,737 | 0.18 | | |
| Luciano Almeida | Wanderlan Costa | PRTB | 2,110 | 0.14 | | |
| Total | | | 1,520,131 | 100.00 | 1,594,262 | 100.00 |
| Valid votes | | | 1,520,131 | 84.32 | 1,594,262 | 89.44 |
| Invalid votes | | | 193,891 | 10.76 | 140,477 | 7.88 |
| Blank votes | | | 88,769 | 4.92 | 47,668 | 2.67 |
| Total votes | | | 1,802,791 | 100.00 | 1,782,407 | 100.00 |
| Registered voters/turnout | | | 2,302,905 | 78.28 | 2,302,905 | 77.40 |
| MDB hold | | | | | | |
Source: Superior Electoral Court

2022 Sergipe gubernatorial election
- 2 October 2022
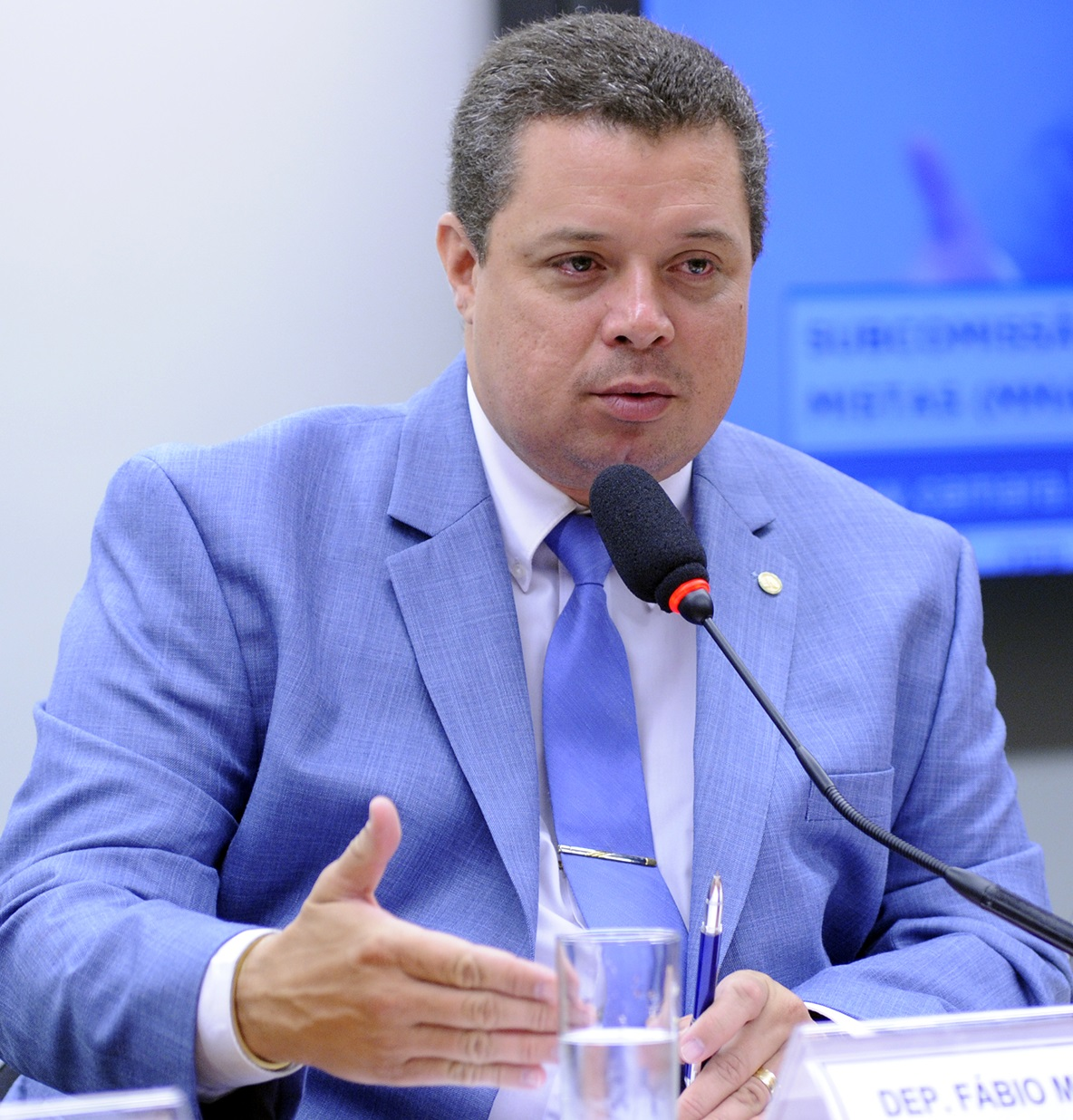

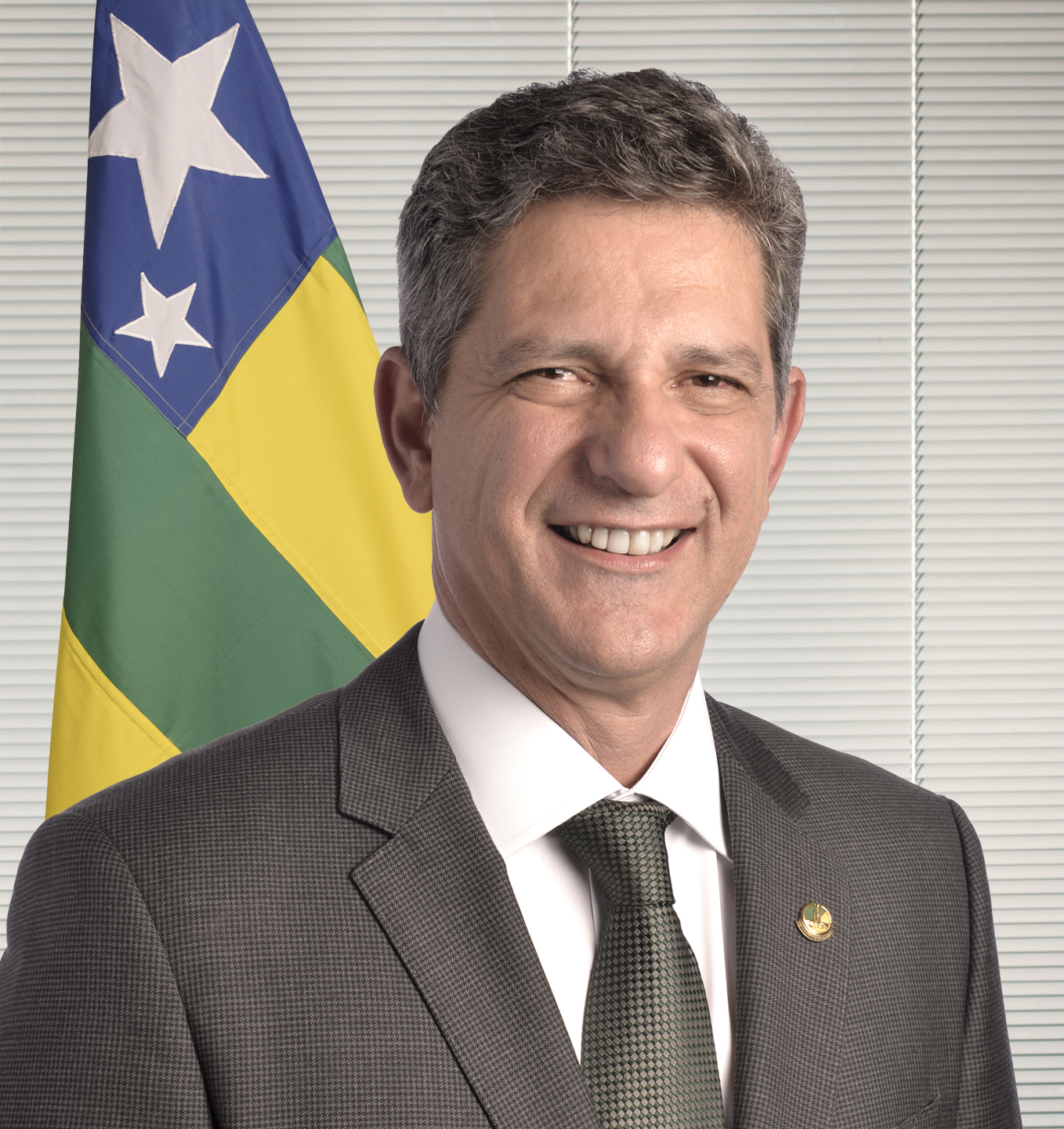
| Candidate | Fábio Mitidieri | Rogério Carvalho |
| Party | PSD | PT |
| Alliance | New Time for Sergipe | Sergipe of Hope |
| Running mate | Zezinho Sobral | Sérgio Gama |
| Popular vote | 623,851 | 582,940 |
| Percentage | 51.70% | 48.30% |
- Most voted candidate by municipality (75): Fábio Mitidieri (27) Rogério Carvalho (48)

=== Sergipe ===
In Sergipe, incumbent Belivaldo Chagas chose not to run for reelection after a series of scandals. Fábio Mitidieri, a Federal deputy from Chagas' party, won the election against incumbent senator Rogério Carvalho Santos from the PT.

In the first round, Valmir de Francisquinho, the popular mayor of Itabaiana from the Liberal Party, won 39.78% of the vote but his candidacy was cancelled, leading Mitidieri and Carvalho to the second round. Even with the unlikely endorsement of Francisquinho, Carvalho lost, continuing the failures of the PT in Sergipe state elections.

| Candidate | Running mate | Party | First round | | Second round | |
| Candidate | Running mate | Party | Votes | % | Votes | % |
|---|---|---|---|---|---|---|
| Fábio Mitidieri | Zezinho Sobral (PDT) | PSD | 294,936 | 38.91 | 623,851 | 51.70 |
| Rogério Carvalho | Sérgio Gama (MDB) | PT | 338,796 | 44.70 | 582,940 | 48.30 |
| Alessandro Vieira | Milton Andrade (CID) | PSDB | 82,495 | 10.88 | | |
| Niully Campos | Demétrio Varjão | PSOL | 37,366 | 4.93 | | |
| Cláudio das Neves | Giovanna Rocha | DC | 2,655 | 0.35 | | |
| Aroldo Félix | Luze Augusta | UP | 1,044 | 0.14 | | |
| Elinos Sabino | Leidi Lima | PSTU | 646 | 0.09 | | |
| Total | | | 757,938 | 100.00 | 1,206,791 | 100.00 |
| Valid votes | | | 757,938 | 55.62 | 1,206,791 | 89.16 |
| Invalid votes | | | 542,062 | 39.78 | 99,505 | 7.35 |
| Blank votes | | | 62,604 | 4.59 | 47,242 | 3.49 |
| Total votes | | | 1,362,604 | 100.00 | 1,353,538 | 100.00 |
| Registered voters/turnout | | | 1,671,801 | 81.51 | 1,671,801 | 80.96 |
| PSD hold | | | | | | |

=== Bahia ===
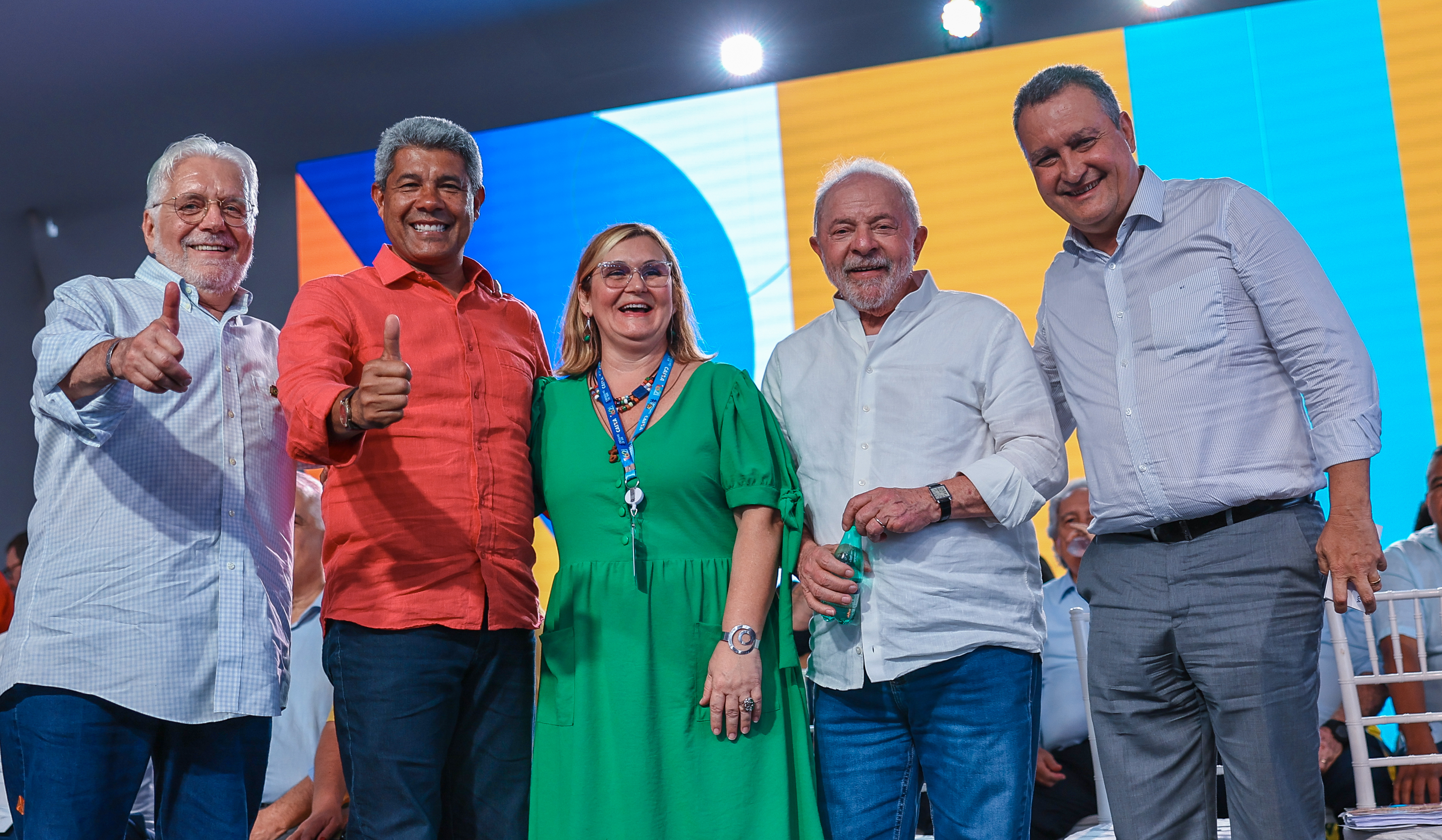
Incumbent Rui Costa (far-right) could not run for a third term, but a member of his party Jerônimo Rodrigues (second left) was elected. Costa became Chief of Staff for Luiz Inácio Lula da Silva (left from Costa).

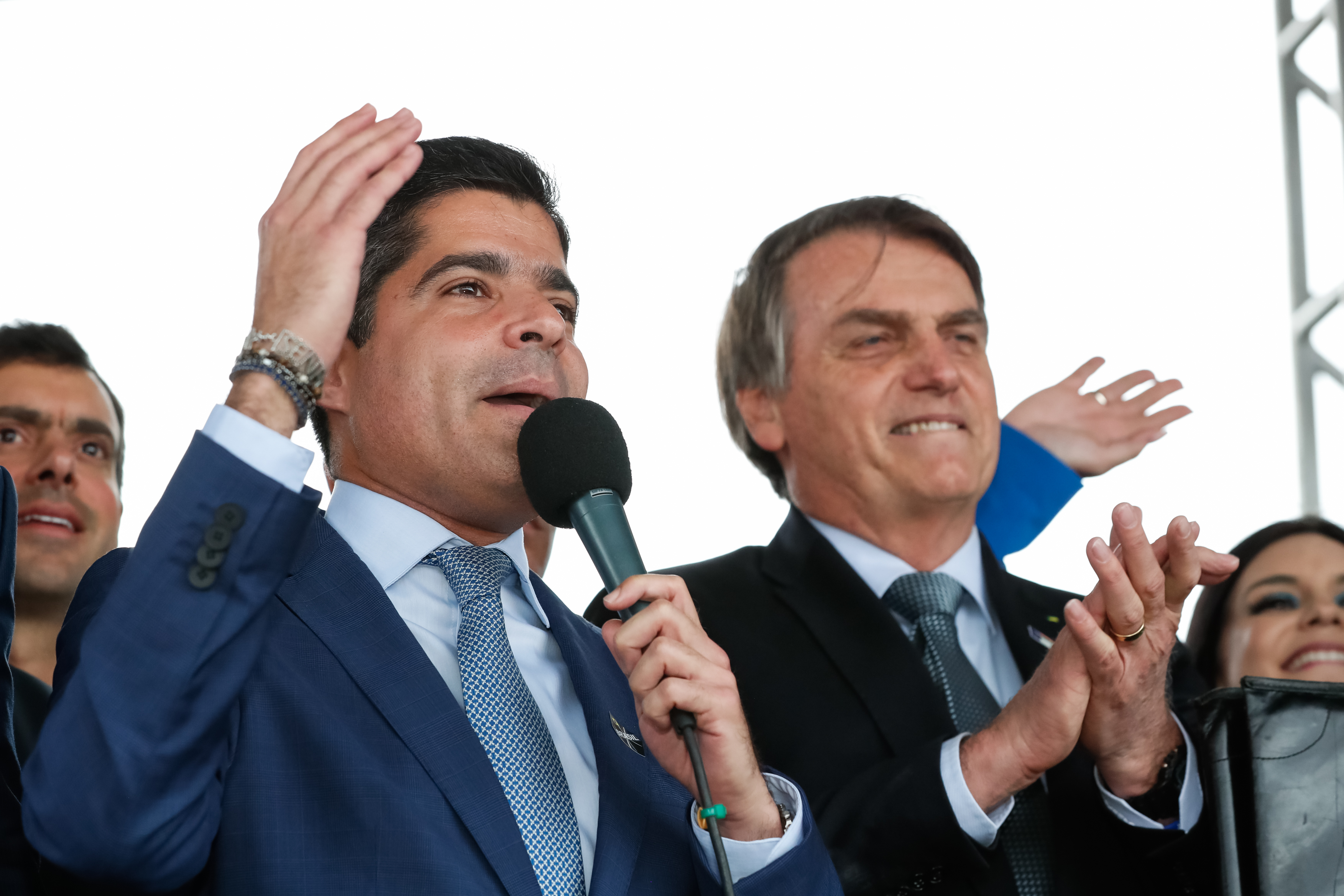
ACM Neto (left), a centrist mayor from a political family, refused to support a presidential candidate, leading to Jair Bolsonaro (right) to launch João Roma, his Minister of Citizenship, for the election

In Bahia, Jerônimo Rodrigues, a bureaucrat in the government of incumbent Rui Costa and former National Secretary for Territorial Development in the Rousseff presidency, defeated ACM Neto, the former mayor of Salvador da Bahia, Secretary General of the Brazil Union, and grandson of former governor ACM in the second round.

Rodrigues became Brazil's first self-declared indigenous governor.

| Candidate | Running mate | Party | First round | | Second round | |
| Candidate | Running mate | Party | Votes | % | Votes | % |
|---|---|---|---|---|---|---|
| Jerônimo Rodrigues | Geraldo Júnior (MDB) | PT | 4,019,830 | 49.45 | 4,480,464 | 52.79 |
| ACM Neto | Ana Coelho (REP) | UNIÃO | 3,316,711 | 40.80 | 4,007,023 | 47.21 |
| João Roma | Leonídia Umbelina (PMB) | PL | 738,311 | 9.08 | | |
| Kleber Rosa | Ronaldo Mansur | PSOL | 48,239 | 0.59 | | |
| Giovani Damico | João Coimbra | PCB | 5,951 | 0.07 | | |
| Marcelo Millet | Roque Vieira Jr. | PCO | 826 | | | |
| Total | | | 8,129,042 | 100.00 | 8,487,487 | 100.00 |
| Valid votes | | | 8,129,042 | 91.68 | 8,487,487 | 94.68 |
| Invalid votes | | | 500,667 | 5.65 | 363,656 | 4.06 |
| Blank votes | | | 236,750 | 2.67 | 113,101 | 1.26 |
| Total votes | | | 8,866,459 | 100.00 | 8,964,244 | 100.00 |
| Registered voters/turnout | | | 11,291,528 | 78.52 | 11,291,528 | 79.39 |
| PT hold | | | | | | |
Source: Superior Electoral Court

== Southeast ==
=== Minas Gerais ===
Incumbent governor Romeu Zema defeated Belo Horizonte Mayor Alexandre Kalil in the first round.

| Candidate | Running mate | Party | Votes | % |
|---|---|---|---|---|
| Romeu Zema (incumbent) | Mateus Simões | NOVO | 6,094,136 | 56.20 |
| Alexandre Kalil | André Quintão (PT) | PSD | 3,805,182 | 35.09 |
| Carlos Viana | Wanderley Amaro (REP) | PL | 783,800 | 7.23 |
| Marcus Pestana | Paulo Brandt | PSDB | 60,637 | 0.56 |
| Lorene Figueiredo | Ana Azevedo | PSOL | 44,898 | 0.41 |
| Paulo Tristão | Antônio Otávio | PMB | 15,774 | 0.15 |
| Indira Xavier | Edna Gonçalves | UP | 15,604 | 0.14 |
| Renata Regina | Tuani Guimarães | PCB | 12,514 | 0.12 |
| Vanessa Portugal | Jordano Carvalho | PSTU | 12,009 | 0.11 |
| Lourdes Francisco | Sebastião Pessoas | PCO | 2,012 | |
| Total | | | 10,844,554 | 100.00 |
| Valid votes | | | 10,844,554 | 85.78 |
| Invalid votes | | | 1,089,431 | 8.62 |
| Blank votes | | | 707,694 | 5.60 |
| Total votes | | | 12,641,679 | 100.00 |
| Registered voters/turnout | | | 16,283,828 | 77.63 |
| NOVO hold | | | | |

=== Espiríto Santo ===
Incumbent governor Renato Casagrande won reelection a rematch against Carlos Manato, a former Federal Deputy.

| Candidate | Running mate | Party | First round | | Second round | |
| Candidate | Running mate | Party | Votes | % | Votes | % |
|---|---|---|---|---|---|---|
| Renato Casagrande (incumbent) | Ricardo Ferraço (PSDB) | PSB | 976,652 | 46.94 | 1,171,288 | 53.80 |
| Carlos Manato | Bruno Lourenço (PTB) | PL | 800,598 | 38.48 | 1,006,021 | 46.20 |
| Guerino Zanon | Marcus Magalhães | PSD | 146,177 | 7.03 | | |
| Audifax Barcelos | Carla Andresa (SD) | REDE | 135,512 | 6.51 | | |
| Aridelmo Teixeira | Camila Domingues | NOVO | 15,786 | 0.76 | | |
| Vinicius Souza | Soraia Chiabai | PSTU | 4,505 | 0.22 | | |
| Cláudio Paiva | Aurélio Ferreguetti | PRTB | 1,418 | 0.07 | | |
| Total | | | 2,080,648 | 100.00 | 2,177,309 | 100.00 |
| Valid votes | | | 2,080,648 | 90.01 | 2,177,309 | 93.92 |
| Invalid votes | | | 129,835 | 5.62 | 94,782 | 4.09 |
| Blank votes | | | 101,146 | 4.38 | 46,259 | 2.00 |
| Total votes | | | 2,311,629 | 100.00 | 2,318,350 | 100.00 |
| Registered voters/turnout | | | 2,917,714 | 79.23 | 2,917,714 | 79.46 |

=== Rio de Janeiro ===
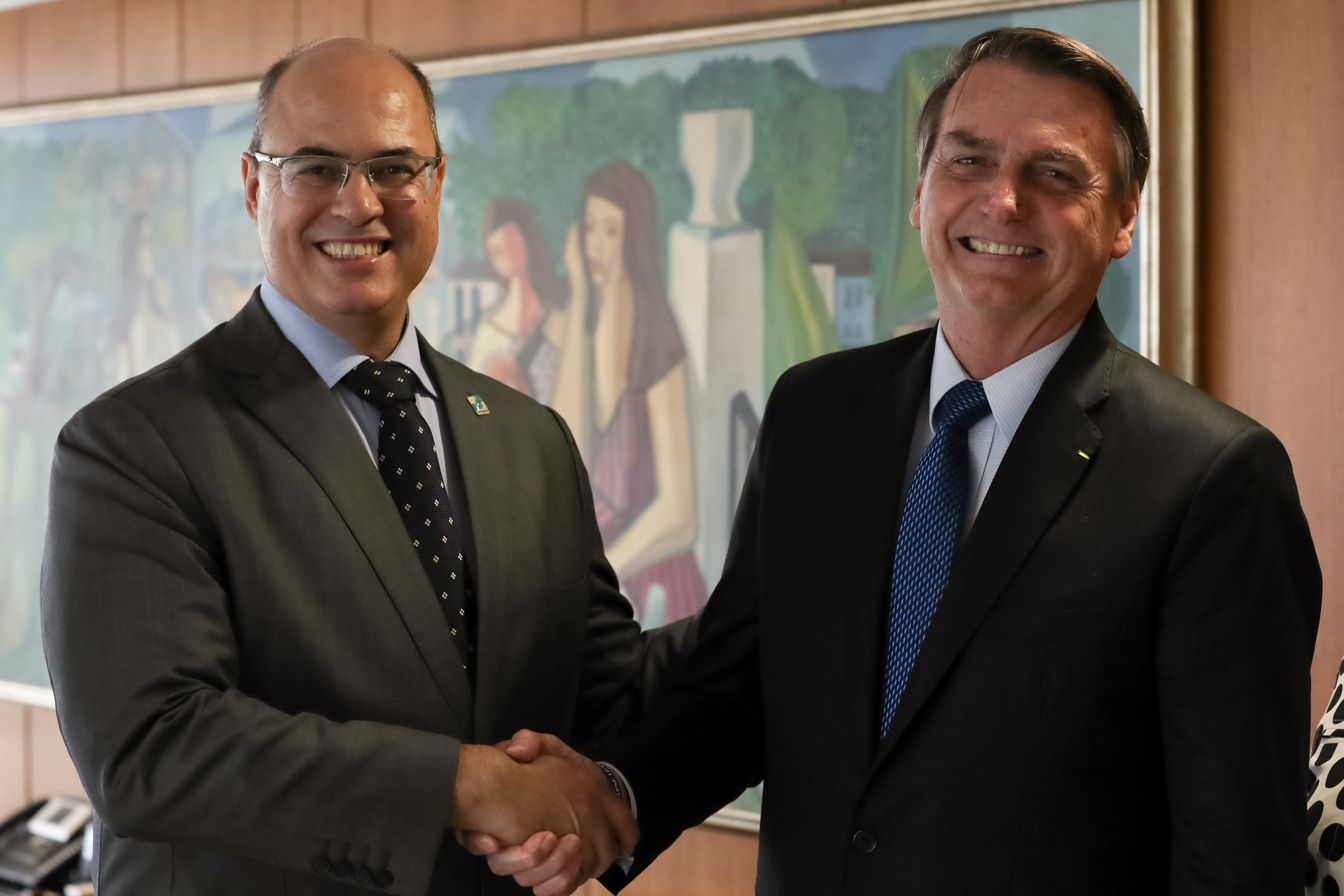
Wilson Witzel (left), a staunch supporter of Jair Bolsonaro (right), was impeached before the election. He attempted to run again in 2022 with the PMB, a fringe party, but his candidacy was rejected.

Incumbent governor Cláudio Castro was elected to his first full term. He became governor after the impeachment of Wilson Witzel.

Castro defeated Federal Deputy Marcelo Freixo and former mayor of Niterói Rodrigo Neves in the first round.

| Candidate | Running mate | Party | Votes | % |
|---|---|---|---|---|
| Cláudio Castro (incumbent) | Thiago Pampolha (UNIÃO) | PL | 4,930,288 | 58.69 |
| Marcelo Freixo | César Maia (PSDB) | PSB | 2,300,980 | 27.39 |
| Rodrigo Neves | Felipe Santa Cruz (PSD) | PDT | 672,291 | 8.00 |
| Paulo Ganime | Hélio Secco | NOVO | 446,580 | 5.32 |
| Juliete Pantoja | Juliana Alves | UP | 27,344 | 0.33 |
| Cyro Garcia | Samantha Guedes | PSTU | 12,627 | 0.15 |
| Eduardo Serra | Bianca Novaes | PCB | 10,852 | 0.13 |
| Luiz Eugênio | Guilherme de Lima | PCO | 1,844 | |
| Total | | | 8,400,962 | 100.00 |
| Valid votes | | | 8,400,962 | 84.91 |
| Invalid votes | | | 901,120 | 9.11 |
| Blank votes | | | 591,576 | 5.98 |
| Total votes | | | 9,893,658 | 100.00 |
| Registered voters/turnout | | | 12,809,126 | 77.24 |
| PL hold | | | | |
Source: Superior Electoral Court

=== São Paulo ===
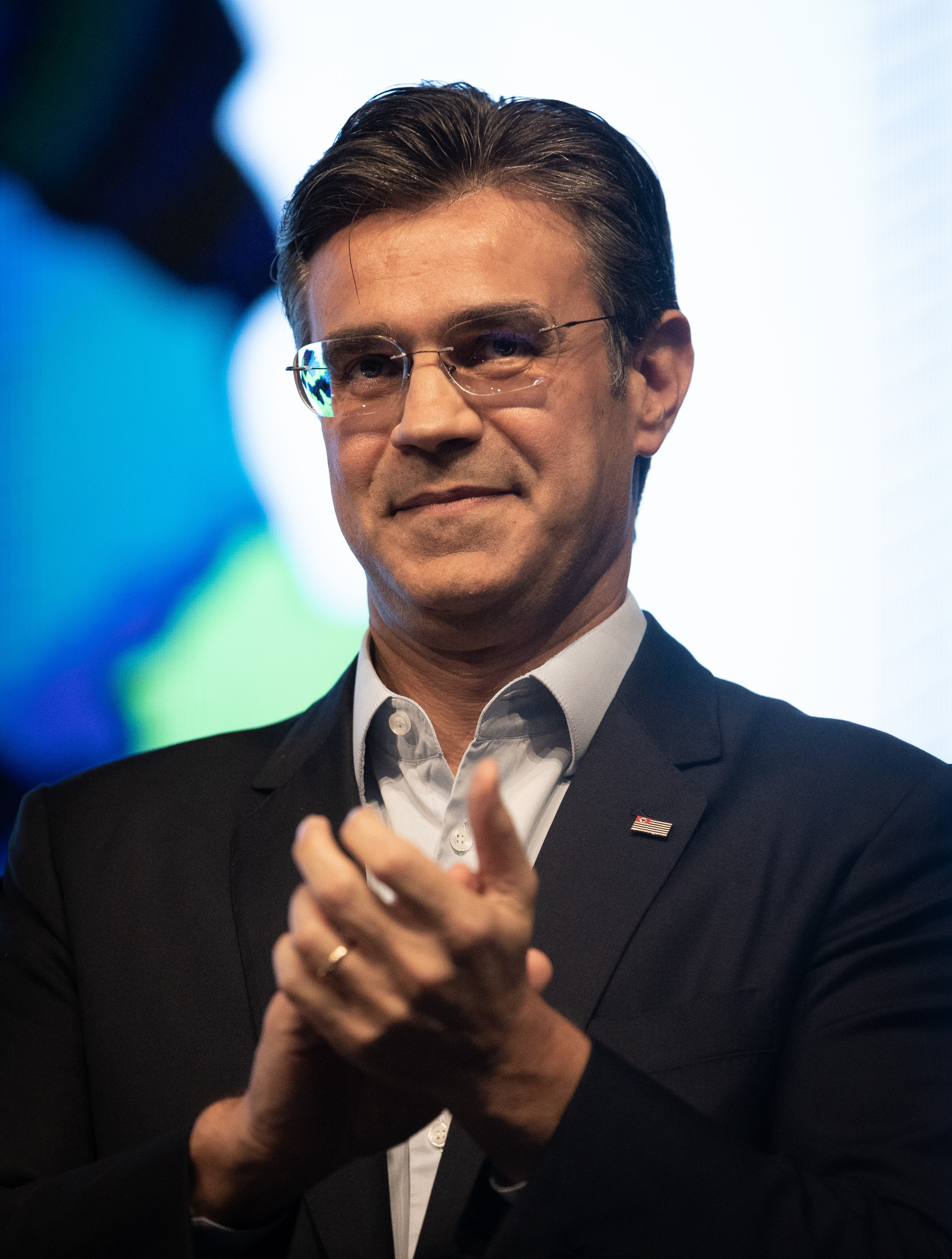
The incumbent governor Rodrigo Garcia switched parties to run with the PSDB but failed to make a second round.

Incumbent governor João Doria resigned in a successful bid for the PSDB nomination for president. He later ended his campaign. His Vice-Governor Rodrigo Garcia was unsuccessful in a bid for a full term, failing to make the second round.

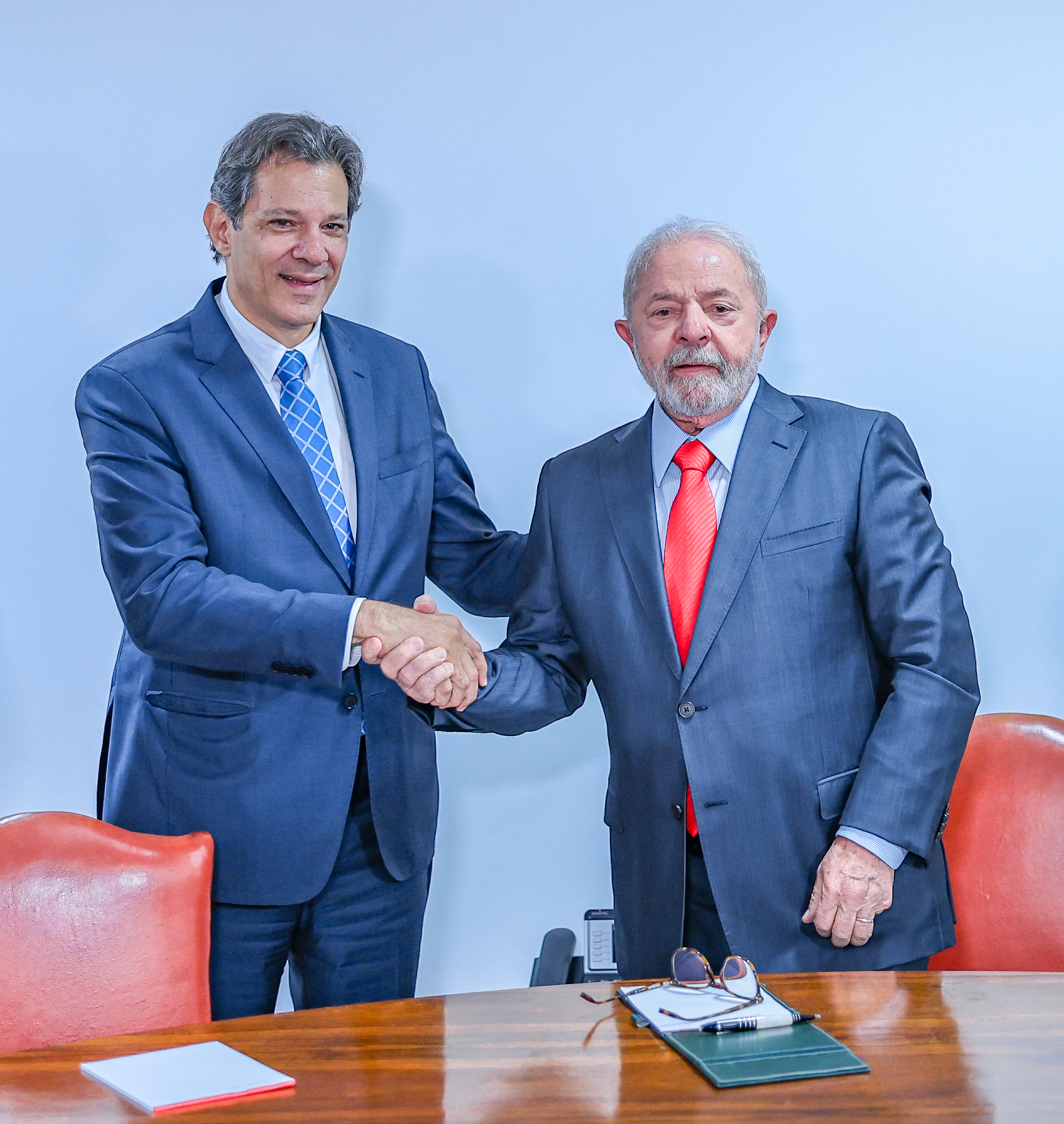
Fernando Haddad (left) was appointed Minister of Finance by Luiz Inácio Lula da Silva (right) after his loss.

Former Minister of Infrastructure in Bolsonaro cabinet, Tarcísio de Freitas was elected in an alliance with former São Paulo mayor Gilberto Kassab. Freitas defeated former Minister of Education, former Mayor of São Paulo, and 2018 presidential candidate Fernando Haddad in the second round.

| Candidate | Running mate | Party | First round | | Second round | |
| Candidate | Running mate | Party | Votes | % | Votes | % |
|---|---|---|---|---|---|---|
| Tarcísio de Freitas | Felício Ramuth (PSD) | REP | 9,881,995 | 42.32 | 13,480,190 | 55.27 |
| Fernando Haddad | Lúcia França (PSB) | PT | 8,337,139 | 35.70 | 10,908,972 | 44.73 |
| Rodrigo Garcia (incumbent) | Geninho Zuliani (UNIÃO) | PSDB | 4,296,293 | 18.40 | | |
| Vinicius Poit | Doris Alves | NOVO | 388,974 | 1.67 | | |
| Elvis Cezar | Gleides Sodré | PDT | 281,712 | 1.21 | | |
| Carol Vigliar | Eloiza Alves | UP | 88,767 | 0.38 | | |
| Gabriel Colombo | Aline Miglioli | PCB | 46,727 | 0.20 | | |
| Altino Prazeres | Flávia Bischain | PSTU | 14,859 | 0.06 | | |
| Antonio Jorge | Vitor Rocca | DC | 10,778 | 0.05 | | |
| Edson Dorta | Lilian Miranda | PCO | 5,305 | 0.02 | | |
| Total | | | 23,352,549 | 100.00 | 24,389,162 | 100.00 |
| Valid votes | | | 23,352,549 | 86.02 | 24,389,162 | 89.20 |
| Invalid votes | | | 2,149,776 | 7.92 | 1,849,223 | 6.76 |
| Blank votes | | | 1,645,522 | 6.06 | 1,102,462 | 4.03 |
| Total votes | | | 27,147,847 | 100.00 | 27,340,847 | 100.00 |
| Registered voters/turnout | | | 34,639,761 | 78.37 | 34,639,761 | 78.93 |
| Republicanos gain from PSDB | | | | | | |
Source: Superior Electoral Court

== Midwest ==
2022 Goiás gubernatorial election
- 2 October 2022
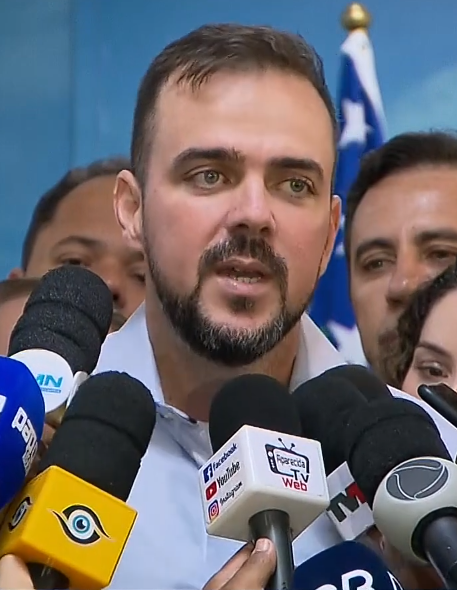
| Candidate | Ronaldo Caiado | Gustavo Mendanha |
| Party | UNIÃO | Patriota |
| Alliance | To Move Forward | An Intelligent State |
| Running mate | Daniel Vilela | Heuler Cruvinel |
| Popular vote | 1,806,892 | 879, 031 |
| Percentage | 51.81% | 25.20% |
- Most voted candidate by municipality (249): Ronaldo Caiado (243) Gustavo Mendanha (5) Major Vitor Hugo (1)

=== Goiás ===
Incumbent governor Ronaldo Caiado won reelection against two right wing rivals in the first round.

| Candidate | Running mate | Party | Votes | % |
|---|---|---|---|---|
| Ronaldo Caiado (incumbent) | Daniel Vilela (MDB) | UNIÃO | 1,806,892 | 51.81 |
| Gustavo Mendanha | Heuler Cruvinel | Patriota | 879,031 | 25.20 |
| Major Vitor Hugo | Keila Borges | PL | 516,579 | 14.81 |
| Wolmir Amado | Fernando Tibúrcio (PSB) | PT | 243,651 | 6.99 |
| Cintia Dias | Edson Braz (REDE) | PSOL | 19,577 | 0.56 |
| Edigar Diniz | Jamil Said | NOVO | 9,565 | 0.27 |
| Helga Martins | Lindomar Santos | PCB | 6,993 | 0.20 |
| Reinaldo Pantaleão | Luciana Amorim | UP | 5,400 | 0.15 |
| Vinícius Paixão | Maria Letícia | PCO | 258 | |
| Total | | | 3,487,688 | 100.00 |
| Valid votes | | | 3,487,688 | 91.61 |
| Invalid votes | | | 166,729 | 4.38 |
| Blank votes | | | 152,864 | 4.02 |
| Total votes | | | 3,807,281 | 100.00 |
| Registered voters/turnout | | | 4,870,292 | 78.17 |
| UNIÃO hold | | | | |

2022 Federal District gubernatorial election
- 2 October 2022
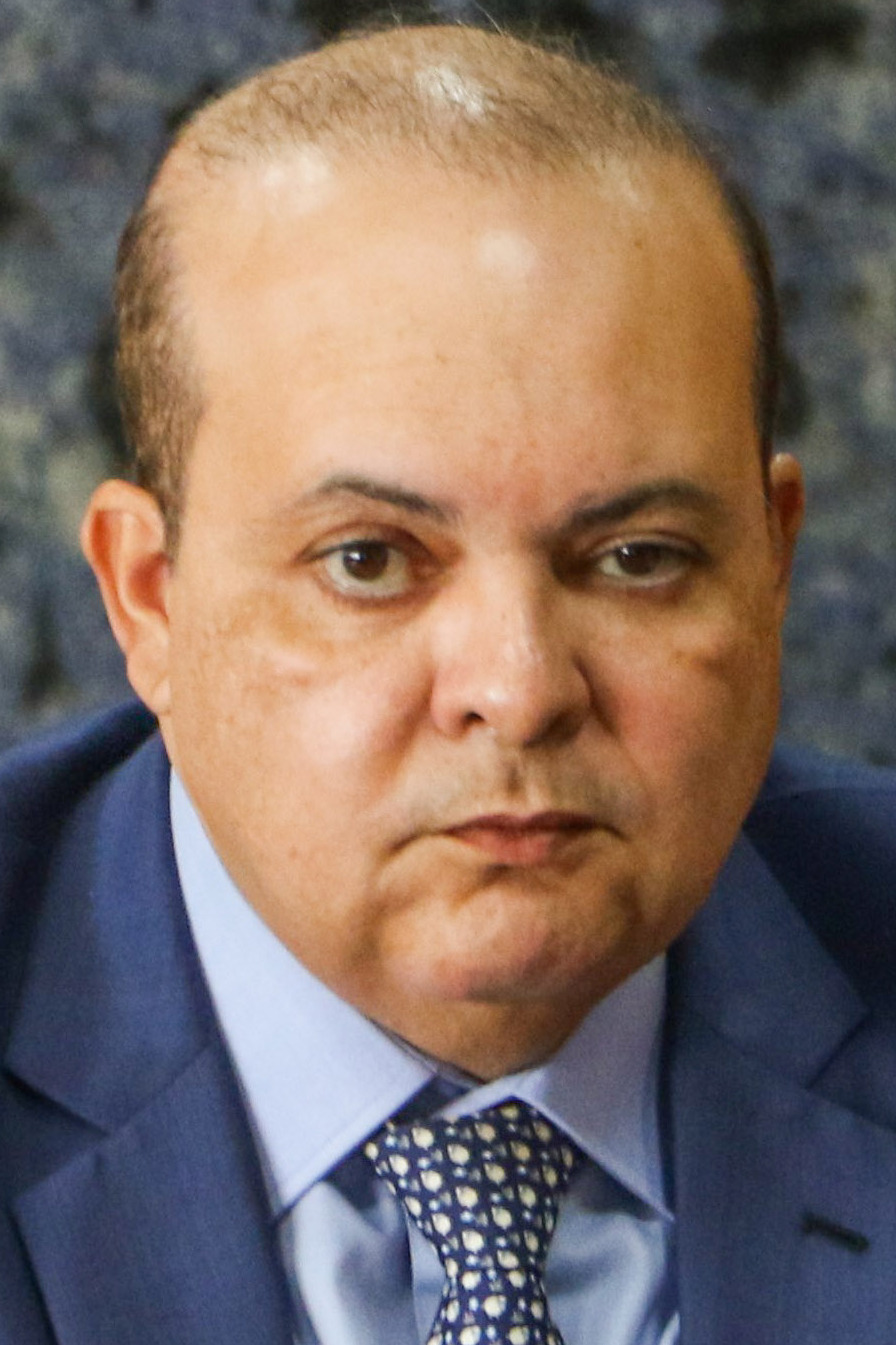

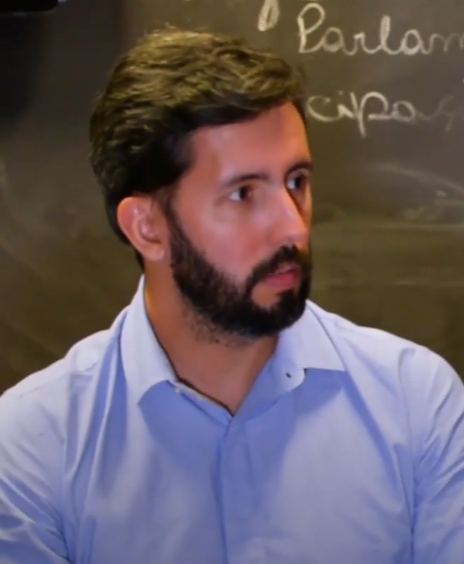
| Candidate | Ibaneis Rocha | Leandro Grass |
| Party | MDB | PV |
| Alliance | United for DF | Brazil of Hope |
| Running mate | Celina Leão | Olgamir Amancia |
| Popular vote | 832,663 | 879, 031 |
| Percentage | 50.31% | 25.20% |
- Most voted candidate by electoral zone(19): Ibaneis Rocha (18) Leandro Grass (1)

=== Federal District ===
Incumbent governor Ibaneis Rocha won reelection the first round.

| Candidate | Running mate | Party | Votes | % |
|---|---|---|---|---|
| Ibaneis Rocha (incumbent) | Celina Leão (PP) | MDB | 832,633 | 50.31 |
| Leandro Grass | Olgamir Amância (PCdoB) | PV | 434,587 | 26.26 |
| Paulo Octávio | Felipe Belmonte (PSC) | PSD | 123,715 | 7.48 |
| Elziovan Moreno | Luiz Gustavo | PTB | 94,100 | 5.69 |
| Leila Barros | Guilherme Campelo | PDT | 79,597 | 4.81 |
| Izalci Lucas | Beth Cupertino (PRTB) | PSDB | 70,584 | 4.26 |
| Keka Bagno | Toni de Castro | PSOL | 13,613 | 0.82 |
| Lucas Salles | Suelene Balduíno | DC | 4,218 | 0.25 |
| Teodoro da Cruz | Jamil Magari | PCB | 1,155 | 0.07 |
| Robson da Silva | Eduardo Zanata | PSTU | 841 | 0.05 |
| Total | | | 1,655,043 | 100.00 |
| Valid votes | | | 1,655,043 | 91.59 |
| Invalid votes | | | 86,099 | 4.76 |
| Blank votes | | | 65,969 | 3.65 |
| Total votes | | | 1,807,111 | 100.00 |
| Registered voters/turnout | | | 2,193,440 | 82.39 |
| MDB hold | | | | |

=== Mato Grosso ===
Incumbent governor Mauro Mendes won reelection the first round.

| Candidate | Running mate | Party | Votes | % |
|---|---|---|---|---|
| Mauro Mendes (incumbent) | Otaviano Pivetta (REP) | UNIÃO | 1,114,549 | 68.45 |
| Marcia Pinheiro | Vanderlucio Rodrigues (PP) | PV | 267,172 | 16.41 |
| Marcos Ritela | Alvani Laurindo | PTB | 233,543 | 14.34 |
| Moisés Franz | Frank Melo | PSOL | 12,948 | 0.80 |
| Total | | | 1,628,212 | 100.00 |
| Valid votes | | | 1,628,212 | 86.19 |
| Invalid votes | | | 162,124 | 8.58 |
| Blank votes | | | 98,676 | 5.22 |
| Total votes | | | 1,889,012 | 100.00 |
| Registered voters/turnout | | | 2,469,414 | 76.50 |
| UNIÃO hold | | | | |

=== Mato Grosso do Sul ===
In Mato Grosso do Sul, Eduardo Riedel, former Secretary of Government and Infustructure for incumbent governor Reinaldo Azambuja, defeated Capitão Contar, a retired military officer and state deputy, in the second round.

Former Vice-Governor Rose Modesto, former governor André Puccinelli, and former mayor of Campo Grande Marquinhos Trad were defeated in the first round. Riedel and Contar competed for Bolsonaro's endorsement which Contar received, while Riedel ran in a coalition with Bolsonaro's Minister of Agriculture Tereza Cristina who was elected to the Senate.

| Candidate | Running mate | Party | First round | | Second round | |
| Candidate | Running mate | Party | Votes | % | Votes | % |
|---|---|---|---|---|---|---|
| Eduardo Riedel | José Carlos Barbosa (PP) | PSDB | 361,981 | 25.22 | 808,210 | 56.90 |
| Renan Contar | Roberto Figueiró | PRTB | 384,275 | 26.77 | 612,113 | 43.10 |
| André Puccinelli | Tania Garib | MDB | 247,093 | 17.21 | | |
| Rose Modesto | Alberto Schlatter (PODE) | UNIÃO | 178,599 | 12.44 | | |
| Giselle Marques | Abílio Vaneli | PT | 135,556 | 9.44 | | |
| Marcos Trad | Viviane Orro | PSD | 124,795 | 8.69 | | |
| Adônis Marcos | Ilmo Cândido (REDE) | PSOL | 3,251 | 0.23 | | |
| Magno de Souza | Carlos Martins | PCO | 2,892 | | | |
| Total | | | 1,435,550 | 100.00 | 1,420,323 | 100.00 |
| Valid votes | | | 1,435,550 | 92.46 | 1,420,323 | 91.78 |
| Invalid votes | | | 64,022 | 4.12 | 88,228 | 5.70 |
| Blank votes | | | 53,082 | 3.42 | 39,059 | 2.52 |
| Total votes | | | 1,552,654 | 100.00 | 1,547,610 | 100.00 |
| Registered voters/turnout | | | 1,993,121 | 77.90 | 1,993,121 | 77.65 |
| PSDB hold | | | | | | |

== South ==
=== Paraná ===
In Paraná, incumbent governor Ratinho Júnior, son of presenter Ratinho and a former Federal Deputy, defeated former governor Roberto Requião, who joined the PT for the election to support Lula.

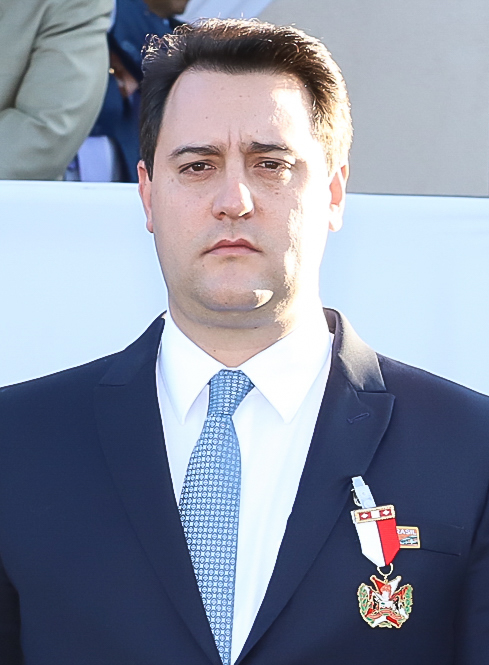
Incumbent Ratinho Júnior was reelected.

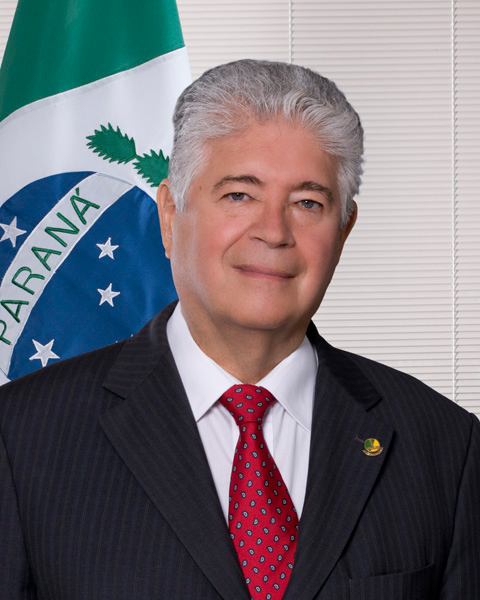
Former governor Roberto Requião came second.

| Candidate | Running mate | Party | Votes | % |
|---|---|---|---|---|
| Ratinho Júnior (incumbent) | Darci Piana | PSD | 4,243,292 | 69.76 |
| Roberto Requião | Jorge Samek | PT | 1,598,204 | 26.28 |
| Ricardo Gomyde | Eliza Ferreira | PDT | 126,945 | 2.09 |
| Joni Correia | Gledson Zawadzki | DC | 50,729 | 0.83 |
| Angela Machado | Sergio Nakatani (REDE) | PSOL | 43,176 | 0.71 |
| Vivi Motta | Diego Valdez | PCB | 13,577 | 0.22 |
| Solange Ferreira | Marco Antonio Santos | PMN | 10,337 | |
| Ivan Bernardo | Phill Natal | PSTU | 4,502 | 0.07 |
| Adriano Teixeira | Cristiano Kusbick Poll | PCO | 2,096 | 0.03 |
| Total | | | 6,082,521 | 100.00 |
| Valid votes | | | 6,082,521 | 89.38 |
| Invalid votes | | | 393,173 | 5.78 |
| Blank votes | | | 329,657 | 4.84 |
| Total votes | | | 6,805,351 | 100.00 |
| Registered voters/turnout | | | 8,480,435 | 80.25 |
| PSD hold | | | | |

=== Santa Catarina ===
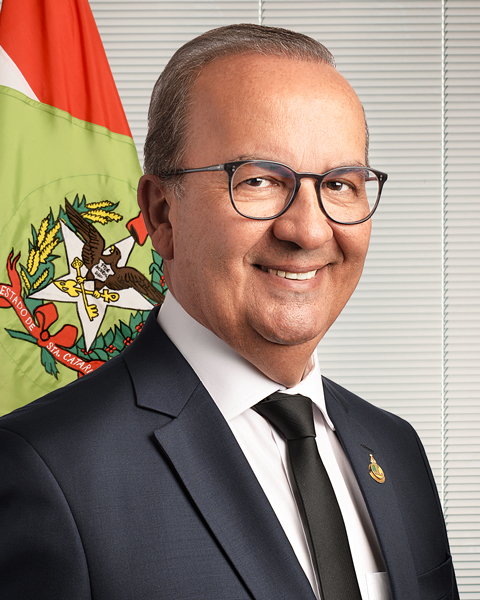
Jorginho Mello, a senator, was elected governor in the second round.

Incumbent governor Carlos Moisés, who had been caught up in several scandals was defeated in the first round.

In the second round, incumbent senator Jorginho Mello defeated former Federal Deputy Décio Lima, former mayor of Blumenau.

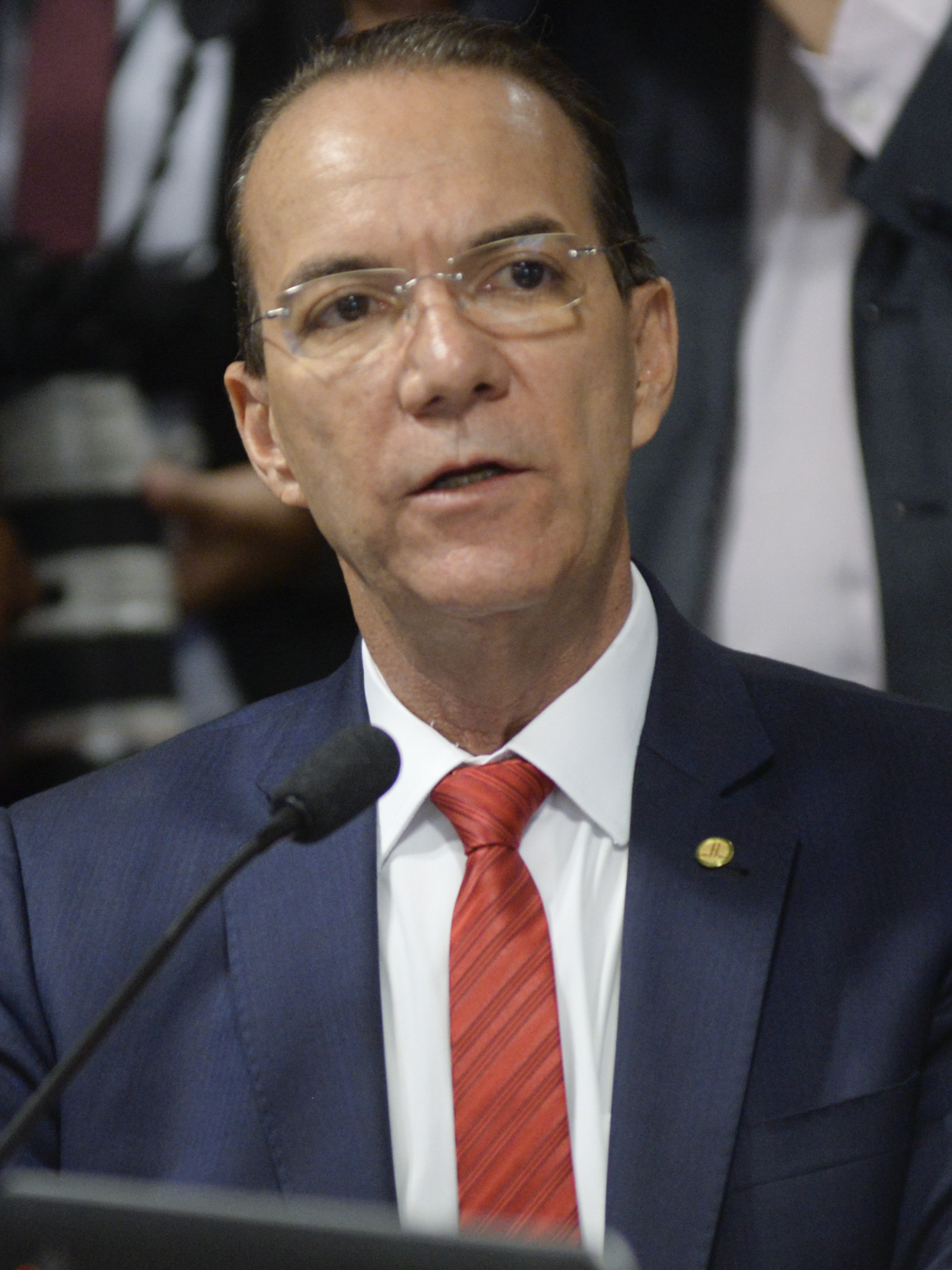
Décio Lima, former Mayor of Blumenau, lost in the second round.

| Candidate | Running mate | Party | First round | | Second round | |
| Candidate | Running mate | Party | Votes | % | Votes | % |
|---|---|---|---|---|---|---|
| Jorginho Mello | Marilisa Boehm | PL | 1,575,912 | 38.62 | 2,983,949 | 70.69 |
| Décio Lima | Beatriz Vargas (PSB) | PT | 710,859 | 17.42 | 1,237,016 | 29.31 |
| Carlos Moisés (incumbent) | Udo Dohler (MDB) | REP | 693,426 | 16.99 | | |
| Gean Loureiro | Eron Giordani (PSD) | UNIÃO | 555,615 | 13.61 | | |
| Esperidião Amin | Dalírio Beber (PSDB) | PP | 398,092 | 9.75 | | |
| Odair Tramontin | Ricardo Althoff | NOVO | 114,087 | 2.80 | | |
| Jorge Boeira | Adilson Buzzi | PDT | 24,809 | 0.61 | | |
| Alex Alano | Gabriela Santetti | PSTU | 4,395 | 0.11 | | |
| Ralf Zimmer | Ana Meotti | PROS | 3,828 | 0.09 | | |
| Leandro Borges | Jair de Aguiar | PCO | 829 | | | |
| Total | | | 4,081,023 | 100.00 | 4,220,965 | 100.00 |
| Valid votes | | | 4,081,023 | 91.26 | 4,220,965 | 93.22 |
| Invalid votes | | | 167,571 | 3.75 | 141,361 | 3.12 |
| Blank votes | | | 223,025 | 4.99 | 165,455 | 3.65 |
| Total votes | | | 4,471,619 | 100.00 | 4,527,781 | 100.00 |
| Registered voters/turnout | | | 5,486,962 | 81.50 | 5,486,962 | 82.52 |
| PL gain from Republicanos | | | | | | |

=== Rio Grande do Sul ===
Eduardo Leite, the incumbent and former mayor of Pelotas, resigned to launch a failed bid for the PSDB nomination. Upon his loss to João Doria, who later ended his candidacy, Leite ran again for governor. Leite edged out State Deputy Edegar Pretto in the first round to defeat Onyx Lorenzoni, Bolsonaro's Minister of Labor and Social Security, in the second round.

| Candidate | Running mate | Party | First round | | Second round | |
| Candidate | Running mate | Party | Votes | % | Votes | % |
|---|---|---|---|---|---|---|
| Eduardo Leite | Gabriel Souza (MDB) | PSDB | 1,702,815 | 26.81 | 3,687,126 | 57.12 |
| Onyx Lorenzoni | Cláudia Jardim | PL | 2,382,026 | 37.50 | 2,767,786 | 42.88 |
| Edegar Pretto | Pedro Ruas (PSOL) | PT | 1,700,374 | 26.77 | | |
| Luis Carlos Heinze | Tanise Sabino | PP | 271,540 | 4.28 | | |
| Roberto Argenta | Nivea Rosa (SD) | PSC | 126,899 | 2.00 | | |
| Vieira da Cunha | Regina dos Santos | PDT | 101,611 | 1.60 | | |
| Ricardo Jobim | Rafael Dresch | NOVO | 38,887 | 0.61 | | |
| Vicente Bogo | Josiane Paz | PSB | 17,222 | 0.27 | | |
| Rejane de Oliveira | Vera de Oliveira | PSTU | 6,252 | 0.10 | | |
| Carlos Messalla | Edson Canabarro | PCB | 4,003 | 0.06 | | |
| Total | | | 6,351,629 | 100.00 | 6,454,912 | 100.00 |
| Valid votes | | | 6,351,629 | 92.28 | 6,454,912 | 93.22 |
| Invalid votes | | | 190,663 | 2.77 | 267,276 | 3.86 |
| Blank votes | | | 341,049 | 4.95 | 202,415 | 2.92 |
| Total votes | | | 6,883,341 | 100.00 | 6,924,603 | 100.00 |
| Registered voters/turnout | | | 8,582,100 | 80.21 | 8,582,100 | 80.69 |
| PSDB hold | | | | | | |
Source: Superior Electoral Court
