= Mara Rocha =

Brazilian politician (born 1973)

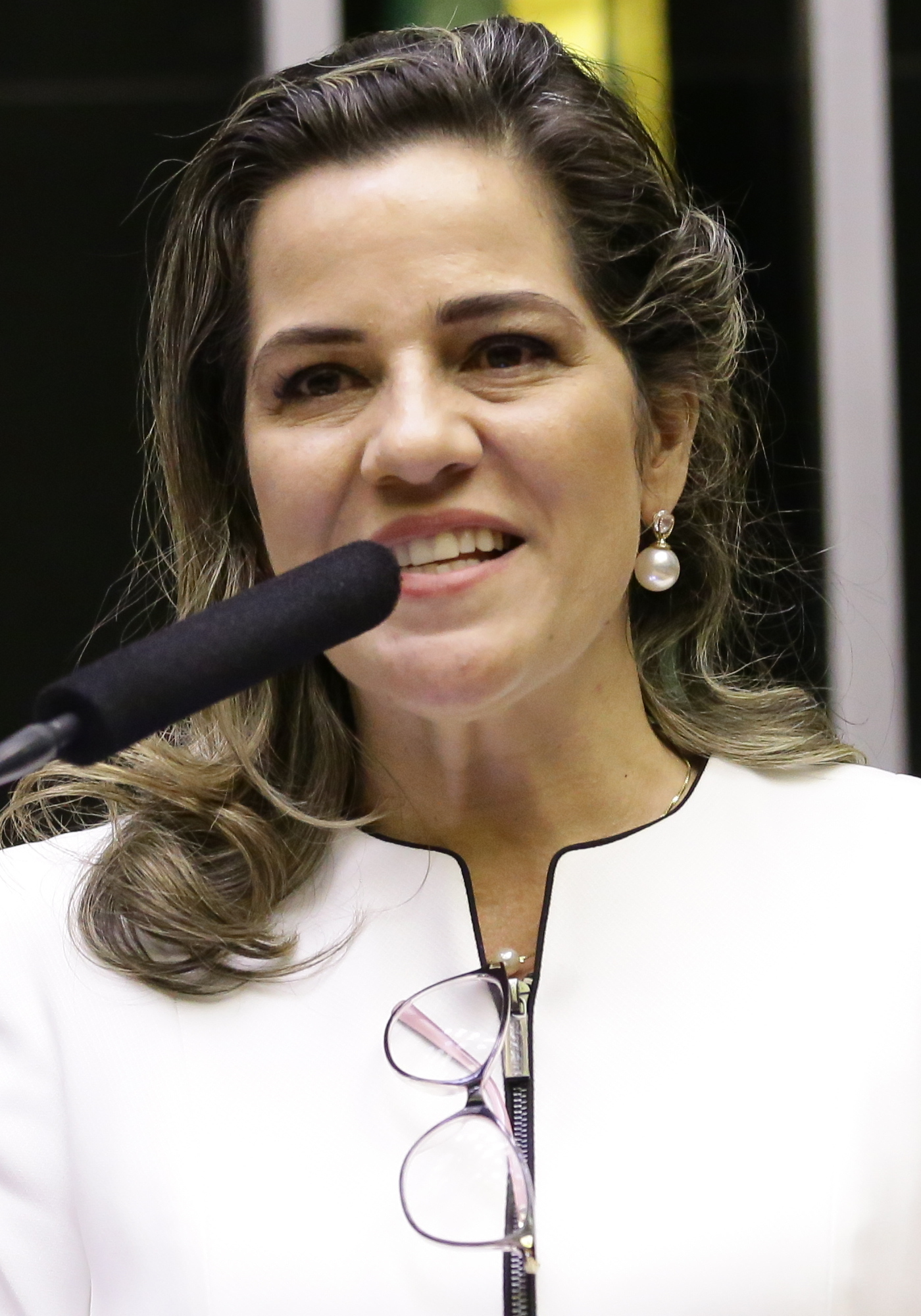
- Rocha in 2019

Senator-elect for Acre
- Assuming office 1 February 2027

Member of the Chamber of Deputies
- In office 1 February 2019 – 1 February 2023
- Constituency: Acre

Personal details
- Born: Cylmara Fernandes da Rocha Gripp; 4 September 1973 (age 53) Rio Branco, Acre, Brazil
- Party: Republicanos (since 2025)
- Other political affiliations: PSDB (2015–2022); MDB (2022–2023)
- Education: Federal University of Acre
- Profession: Entrepeneur, journalist

Cylmara Fernandes da Rocha Gripp (born 4 September 1973), better known as Mara Rocha, is a Brazilian politician who was elected member of the Senate in 2026. From 2019 to 2023, she was a member of the Chamber of Deputies.
