= Major Vitor Hugo =

Brazilian politician (born 1977)

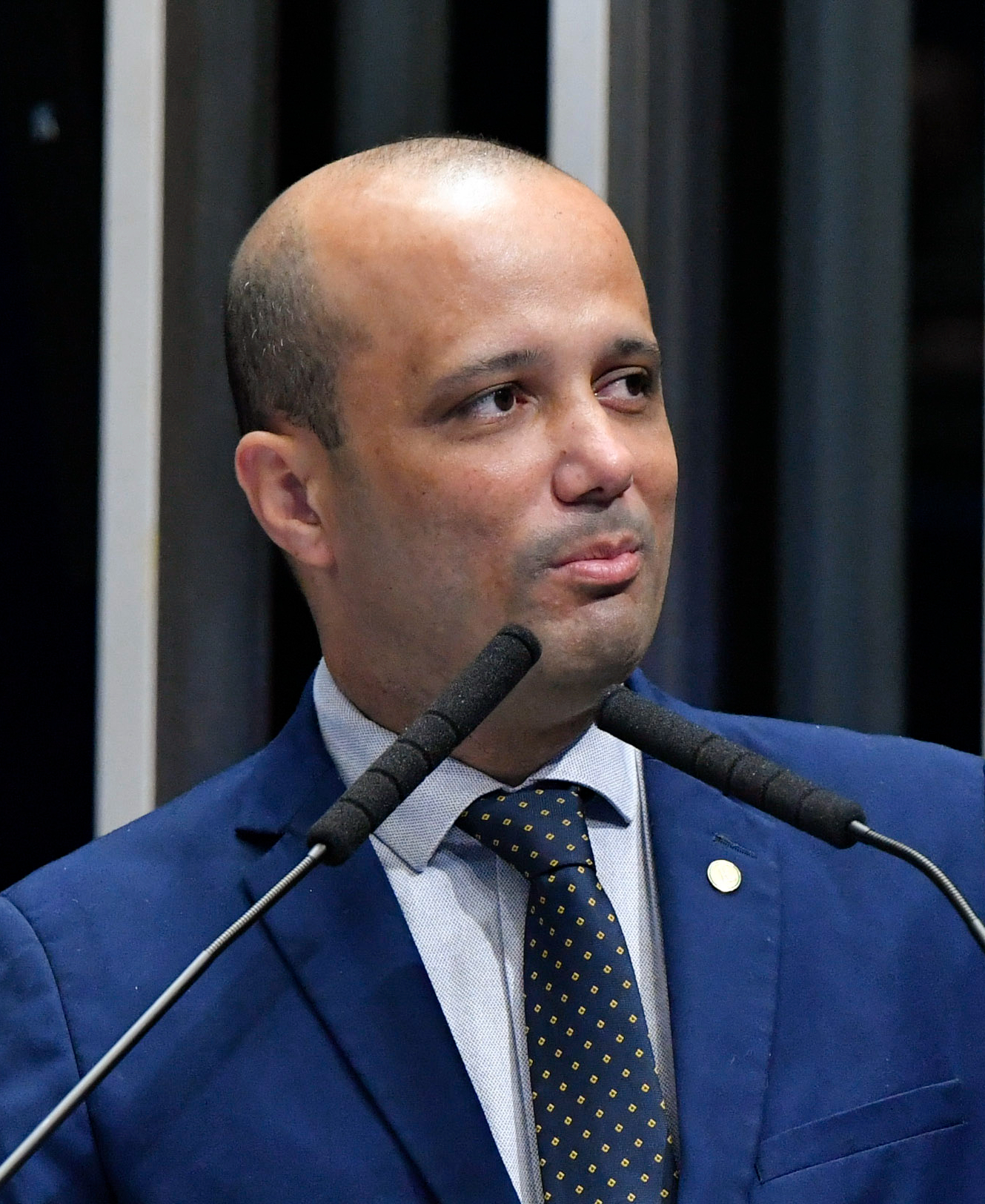
- Hugo in 2019

Member of the Chamber of Deputies
- In office 1 February 2019 – 31 January 2023
- Constituency: Goiás

Personal details
- Born: 31 May 1977 (age 49)
- Party: Liberal Party (since 2022)

Vitor Hugo de Araújo Almeida, better known as Major Vitor Hugo (born 31 May 1977), is a Brazilian politician serving as a city councillor of Goiânia since 2025. From 2019 to 2023, he was a member of the Chamber of Deputies.
