= Tadeu de Souza =

Brazilian politician (born 1972)

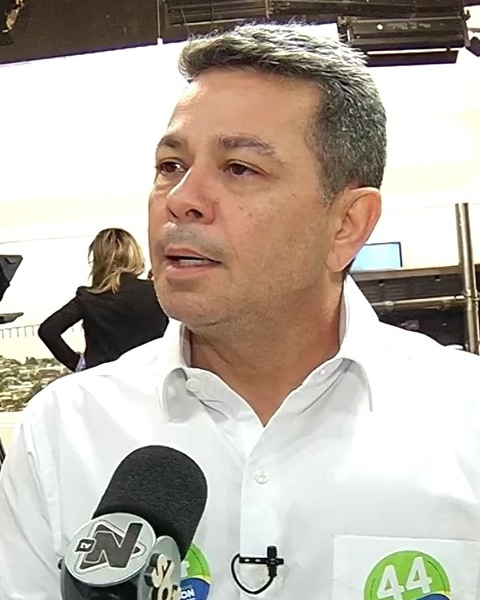
- Souza in 2022

Vice Governor of Roraima
- Incumbent
- Assumed office 1 January 2023
- Governor: Wilson Lima
- Preceded by: Carlos Almeida

Personal details
- Born: 13 May 1972 (age 53)
- Party: Avante (since 2022)

Tadeu de Souza (born 13 May 1972) is a Brazilian politician serving as vice governor of Amazonas since 2023. He has served as chairman of Avante in Manaus since 2024.
