= Zezinho Sobral =

Brazilian politician (born 1965)

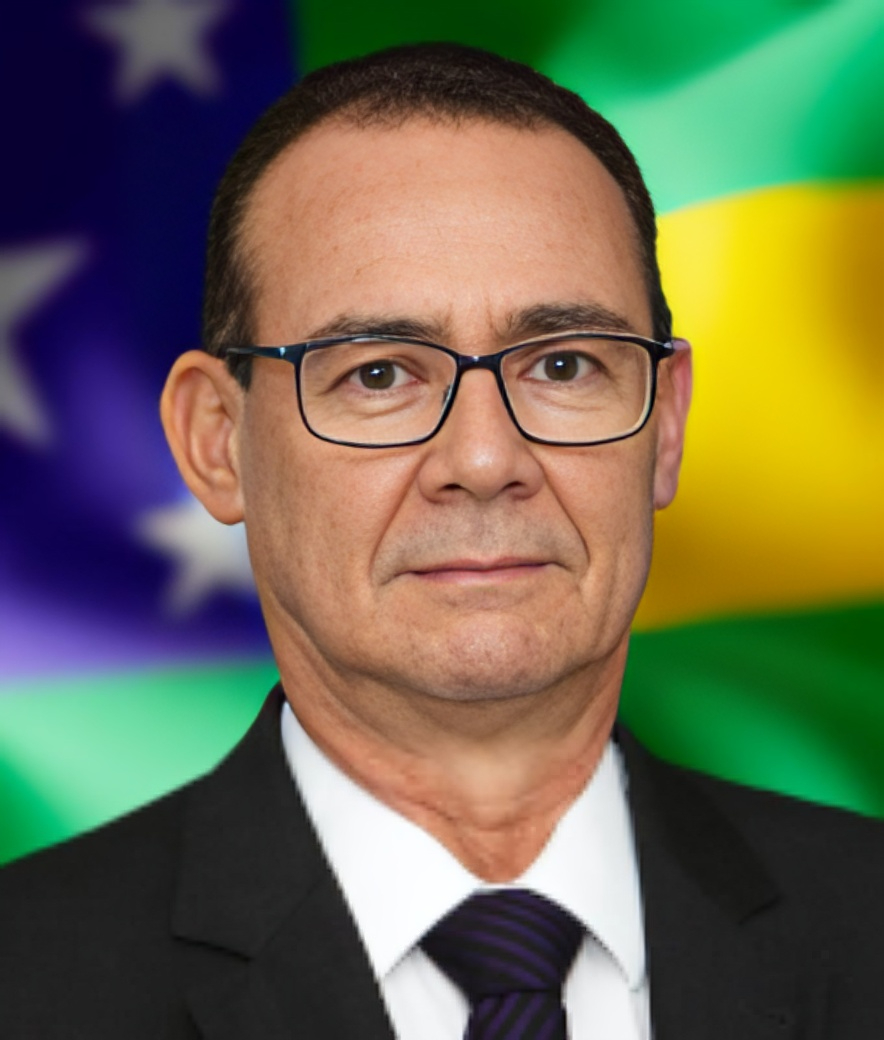
- Sobral in 2023

Vice Governor of Sergipe
- Incumbent
- Assumed office 1 January 2023
- Governor: Fábio Mitidieri
- Preceded by: Eliane Aquino

Personal details
- Born: 26 December 1965 (age 60)
- Party: Brazilian Socialist Party (since 2023)

José Macedo Sobral (born 26 December 1965), better known as Zezinho Sobral, is a Brazilian politician serving as vice governor of Sergipe since 2023. From 2019 to 2023, he was a member of the Legislative Assembly of Sergipe.
