= Styvenson Valentim =

Brazilian politician (born 1977)

- Official portrait

Senator for Rio Grande do Norte
- Incumbent
- Assumed office 1 February 2019

Personal details
- Born: 7 February 1977 (age 49) Rio Branco, Acre, Brazil
- Party: PODE (2019–present)
- Other political affiliations: REDE (2018–19)
- Profession: Military Police officer

Military service
- Branch/service: Military Police of Rio Grande do Norte
- Rank: Captain

Eann Styvenson Valentim Mendes (born 7 February 1977) more commonly known as Styvenson Valentim is a Brazilian politician, as well as a captain in the Brazilian military police. Although born in Acre, he has spent his political career representing Rio Grande do Norte, having served as federal senator since 2019.

== Personal life ==
Valentim served in the Brazilian military police and attained the rank of captain. In the media he is often referred to as "Capitão Styvenson".

== Political career ==
Valentim was elected to the federal senate in the 2018 Brazilian general election. In 2019 Valentim switched to the Podemos party.
