= Simone Tebet =

Brazilian lawyer, professor, writer, and politician

Simone Tebet ORB
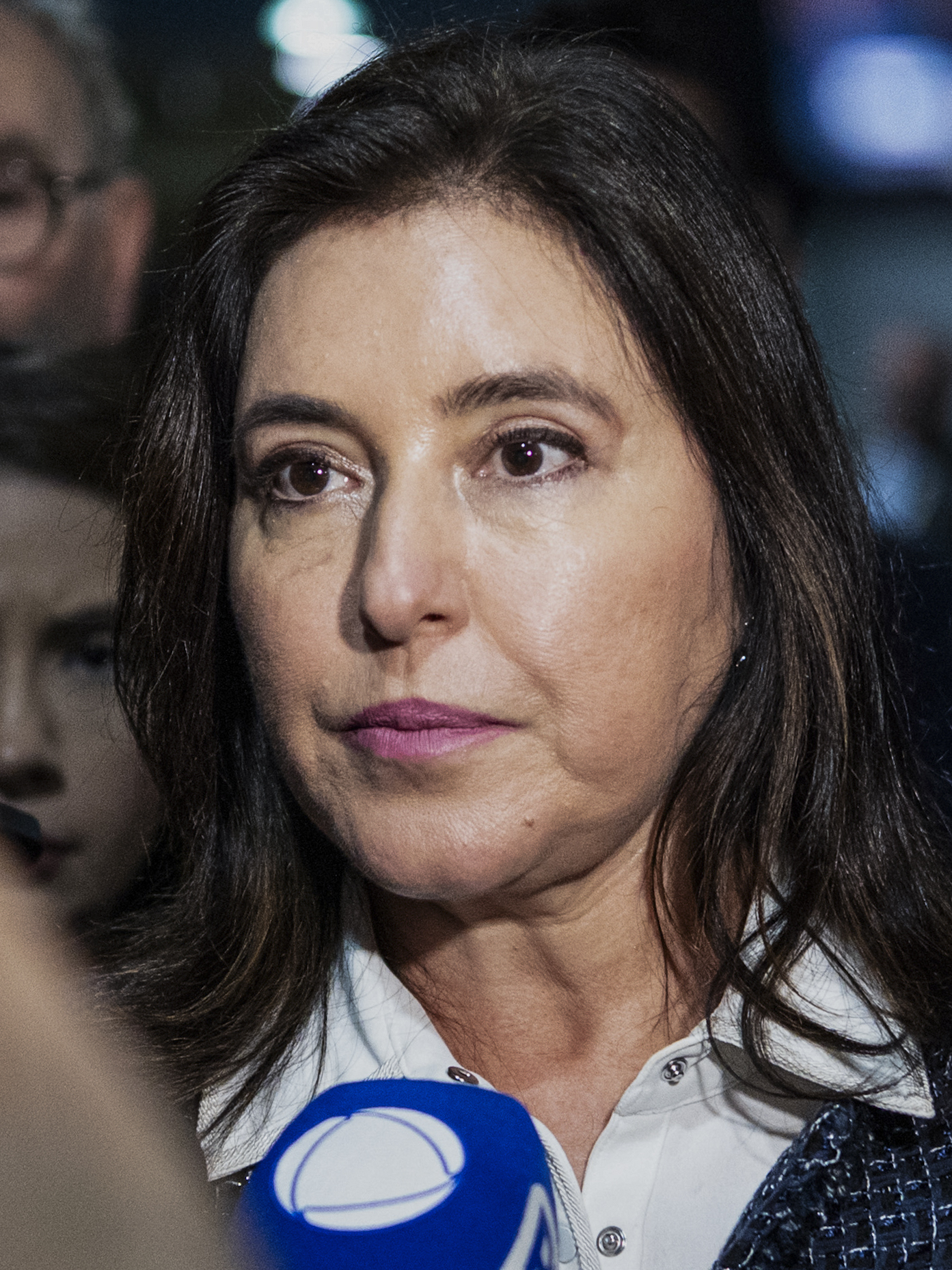
- Tebet in 2025

Minister of Planning and Budget
- In office 1 January 2023 – 31 March 2026
- President: Luiz Inácio Lula da Silva
- Preceded by: Paulo Guedes (Note: Guedes served as Minister of the Economy which became Ministry of Finance under Fernando Haddad and Ministry of Management and Innovation in Public Services under Esther Dweck under the Second cabinet of Lula da Silva.)
- Succeeded by: Bruno Moretti

Senator for Mato Grosso do Sul
- In office 1 February 2015 – 1 February 2023
- Preceded by: Marisa Serrano
- Succeeded by: Tereza Cristina
State offices 2003–2014
Secretary of State of Government of Mato Grosso do Sul
In office 25 April 2013 – 4 January 2014
| Governor | André Puccinelli |
| Preceded by | Osmar Jeronymo |
| Succeeded by | Osmar Jeronymo |
Vice Governor of Mato Grosso do Sul
In office 1 January 2011 – 31 December 2014
| Governor | André Puccinelli |
| Preceded by | Murilo Zauith |
| Succeeded by | Rose Modesto |
Mayor of Três Lagoas
In office 1 January 2005 – 31 March 2010
| Vice Mayor | Luiz Akira (2005–2008); Márcia Moura (2009–2010) |
| Preceded by | Issam Fares |
| Succeeded by | Márcia Moura |
State Deputy of Mato Grosso do Sul
In office 1 February 2003 – 31 December 2004
| Constituency | At-large |

Personal details
- Born: Simone Nassar Tebet; 22 February 1970 (age 56) Três Lagoas, Mato Grosso, (Note: Currently part of Mato Grosso do Sul.) Brazil
- Party: PSB (since 2026)
- Other political affiliations: MDB (1997–2026)
- Spouse: Eduardo Rocha
- Children: 2
- Parent: Ramez Tebet (father)
- Education: UFRJ (LL.B.); Superior School of the Judiciary (BSL); PUC (LL.M.)
- Profession: University professor
- Awards: BBC 100 Women (2022)

Simone Nassar Tebet (Portuguese pronunciation: [siˈmoni naˈsaʁ ˈtɛbetʃi]; born 22 February 1970) is a Brazilian lawyer, professor, and politician who served as Minister of Planning and Budget from 2023 to 2026. A member of the Brazilian Socialist Party (PSB), she previously served as Senator for Mato Grosso do Sul from 2015 to 2023, vice-governor of the same state from 2011 to 2014, and mayor of Três Lagoas from 2005 to 2010, becoming the first woman to hold the latter two posts.

The daughter of Ramez Tebet, a former President of the Federal Senate, she built her career in Mato Grosso do Sul before entering national politics in 2015. In the Senate she led the Brazilian Democratic Movement (MDB) caucus, presided over the Constitution, Justice and Citizenship Commission, and stood for the Senate presidency. Holding socially liberal and pro-market positions, she has been active on gender equality and agribusiness policy.

Tebet was the MDB's candidate in the 2022 presidential election, campaigning on a centrist Third Way platform and finishing third in the first round with 4.16% of the vote. She endorsed Lula ahead of the runoff, which he won narrowly, and joined his cabinet the following year. As minister, she was a leading advocate of fiscal discipline and institutional stability, often acting as a bridge between the government's left-leaning bloc and business sectors. In 2026, Tebet left the MDB for the PSB to run for the Senate in the 2026 São Paulo general election with Lula's support.

== Early life ==
Tebet was born in Três Lagoas on 22 February 1970 to governor, senator, and President of the National Congress Ramez Tebet and Fairte Nassar Tebet, a philanthropist, both of Lebanese descent.

=== Education ===
Tebet graduated in law from the Federal University of Rio de Janeiro and is a specialist in legal science from the Escola Superior de Magistratura, and has a master‘s degree in state law from the Pontifical Catholic University of São Paulo. She began her career as a professor in 1992, working at Dom Bosco Catholic University, Anhanguera-Uniderp University, and the Federal University of Mato Grosso do Sul.

She was a legal technical consultant for the Legislative Assembly of Mato Grosso do Sul between 1995 and 1997 and legislative technical director between 1997 and 2001.

== Early political career ==
Simone Tebet started her career in 2002 when she was elected as a state representative in Mato Grosso do Sul with 25,251 votes, becoming the most voted woman that year.

=== Mayor of Três Lagoas ===
In 2004 Tebet was elected for the first time as the first female mayor of Três Lagoas.

During her first term, she maintained the strong industrialization movement of the city, initiated by her predecessor Issam Fares. In February 2006, private investments in the industrial expansion of Três Lagoas in the last sixty months totaled 1.1 billion reals.

The main private investment attracted to the city was the International Paper factory, opened in 2009 and whose investment was 300 million dollars. Between 2006 and 2009, Três Lagoas experienced a 40% growth in its industrial activity.

In the 2008 municipal elections, she was reelected to the post with more than 75% of the votes.

=== State Government ===
On 31 March 2010, Tebet resigned from the mayor's office to join André Puccinelli's ticket in the election for the government of Mato Grosso do Sul, as a candidate for vice governor. With the ticket victorious, she became the state's first female vice-governor. Between April 2013 and January 2014, Simone headed the Government Secretariat.

Simone Tebet was also director of municipal affairs at the Association of Municipalities of Mato Grosso do Sul and a member of the Representative Council for the Midwest of the National Confederation of Municipalities.

== Federal Senate ==
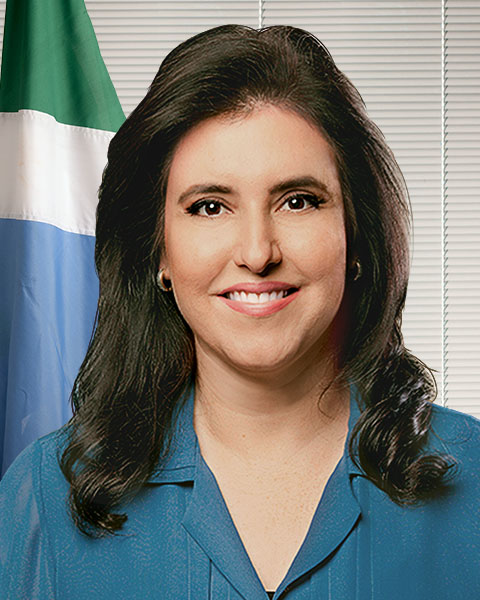
Tebet's official Senate portrait in 2017

In the 2014 parliamentary elections, Tebet ran for senator for Mato Grosso do Sul, being elected on 5 October. She was sworn in as senator on 1 February 2015.

=== Legislative positions ===
In August 2016, she voted in favor of impeaching Dilma Rousseff. In December of that same year, she voted in favor of the PEC do Teto dos Gastos Públicos.

In June 2019, she voted against the government's Decree on Arms, which made it easier to carry and hold firearms. In April 2018, she was chosen leader of the MDB bench in the Federal Senate, a position she held until January 2019.

In July 2017, the senator voted in favor of labor reform.

==== Indigenous lands ====
Tebet, while Senator, defended the payment of compensation to farmers, whose land was taken for indigenous peoples. She also proposed suspending the demarcation of further lands for indigenous peoples for up to four years. Both proposals were criticized by human rights organizations, who point to alleged conflicts of interest, pointing out that the Senator owns a farm in Caarapó, Mato Grosso do Sul. The municipality's recent history has been marked by violence against indigenous populations. Tebet was defended by agricultural interests and Jair Bolsonaro.

==== Covaxin investigation ====
Tebet spearheaded an inquiry into Covaxin fraud in the Senate. She questioned the leader of a taskforce that distributed vaccines and why the contract with the Indian company was cancelled. She reportedly found 20 instances of fraud and said that the documents "should have never gone to the health ministry." She also found multiple translation and formatting errors that the Chief of Staff of the Presidency Onyx Lorenzoni had seemingly ignored, along with cheaper vaccine alternatives like Pfizer and found financial error in the work of Élcio Franco, who is now under investigation by Rosa Weber, a justice of the Supreme Federal Court. In this way, she became one of the main critics of Jair Bolsonaro's COVID-19 response.

=== Senate politics ===
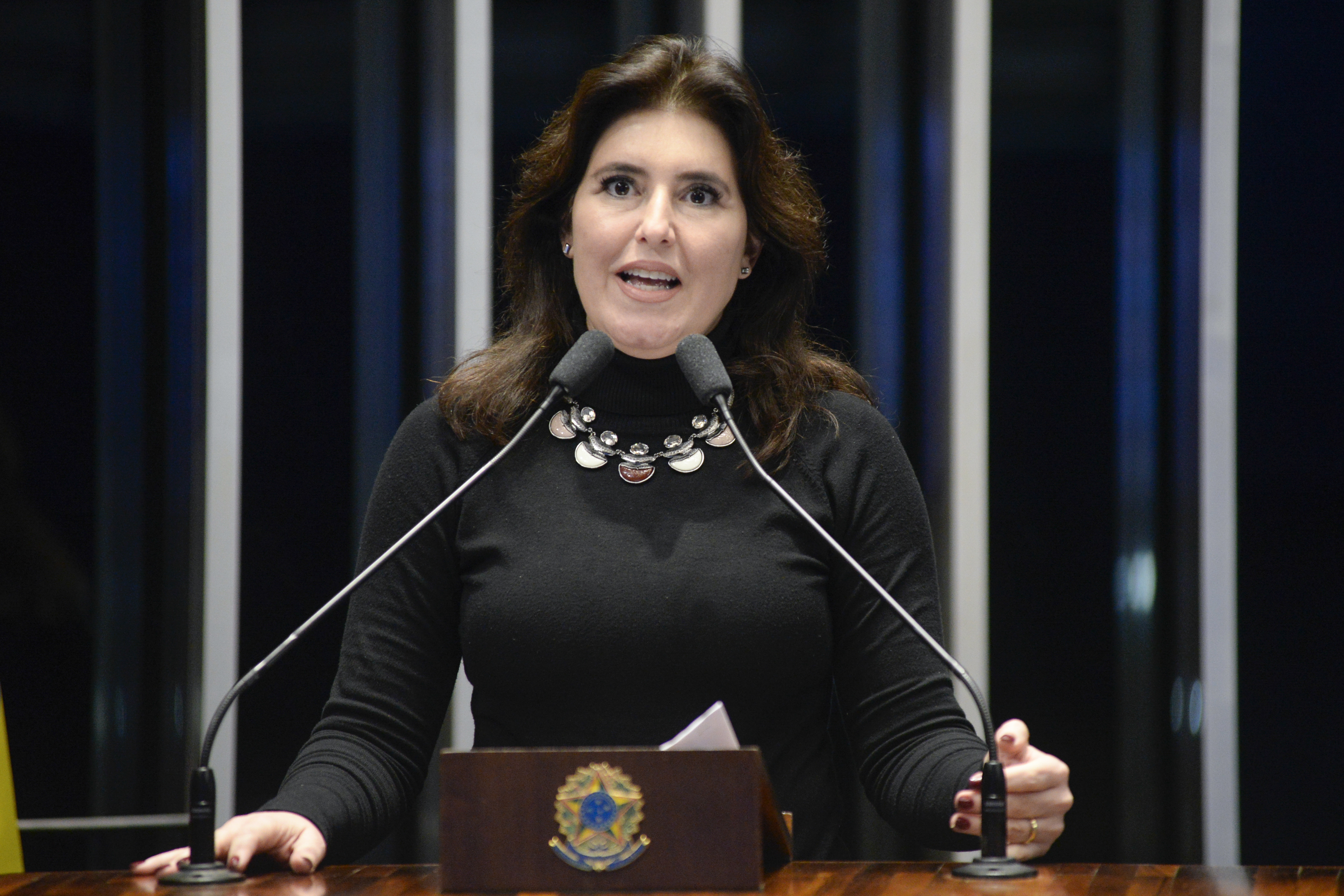
Tebet in the Federal Senate in 2017

In October 2017, she voted in favor of maintaining the mandate of Senator Aécio Neves, overturning the decision of the First Panel of the Federal Supreme Court, where Neves was accused of corruption and obstruction of justice for requesting two million reais from businessman Joesley Batista.

In 2019, the senator disputed the nomination of her party for the candidacy for the presidency of the Federal Senate. However, Renan Calheiros was nominated, losing the election among his party senators by 7 votes to 5. Subsequently, Simone launched a separate candidacy for the position, but ended up withdrawing to increase the chances of a victory for Davi Alcolumbre ( then DEM, now UNIÃO ) over Renan Calheiros, which eventually occurred.

In 2019, she become the first woman to preside over the Constitution, Justice and Citizenship Commission. It is considered the most important one in the Senate.

==== Senate presidency ====
===== 2017 =====
In the elections for the presidency of the Federal Senate of Brazil in 2017, Simone was a pre-candidate for president of the house. However, her party nominated Senator Eunício Oliveira to run for that position.

===== 2021 =====
In January 2021, she was nominated by her party to run for the Senate Presidency. However, the MDB, the party to which Tebet is affiliated, withdrew from the senator's launch to run for office, after signaling the opposing candidate, Rodrigo Pacheco. In this way, Tebet's candidacy became independent. On 1 February 2021, Rodrigo Pacheco was elected president of the Senate, with votes from 57 senators, Tebet obtained 21 votes, placing herself in second place.

| Candidate | Party | Votes | % |
|---|---|---|---|
| Rodrigo Pacheco (MG) ✓ | DEM | 57 | 73.08 |
| Simone Tebet (MS) | MDB | 21 | 26.92 |
| Total | | 78 | 100.00 |
| Registered voters/turnout | | 81 | – |

=== Other elections ===
In the 2018 elections, after the arrest of the then candidate for the state government and governor, André Puccinelli, Simone was nominated for governor, however, she later withdrew from the race due to family issues.

== Presidential campaign ==
Simone Tebet 2022 presidential campaign
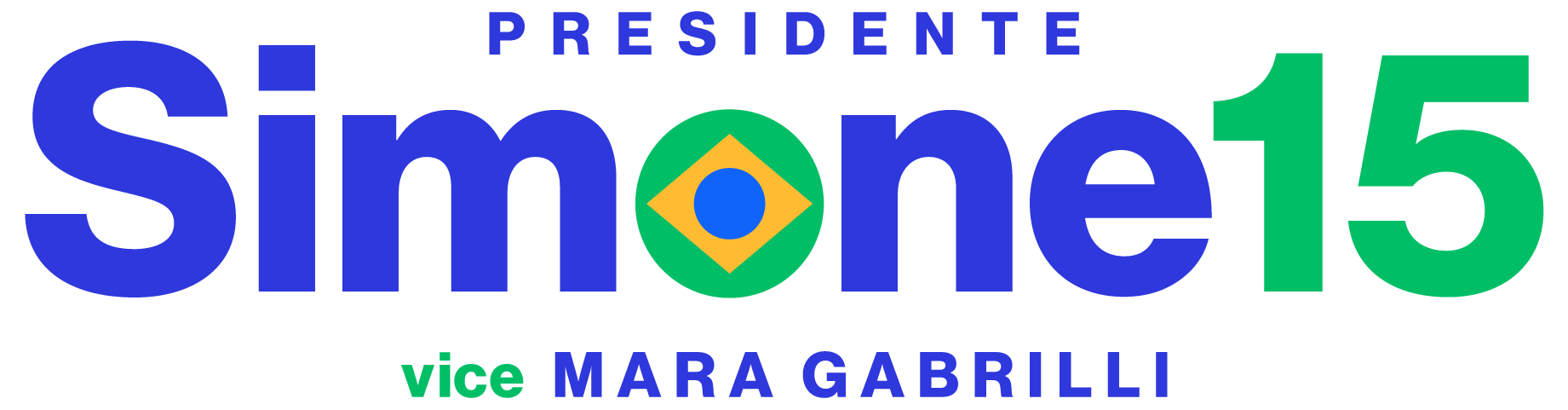
- Campaign: 2022 Brazilian general election
- Candidate: Simone Tebet; Senator for Mato Grosso do Sul; (2015–2023); Mara Gabrilli; Senator for São Paulo; (2019–present)
- Affiliation: PSDB Cidadania Federation; Coalition partners: Brazilian Democratic Movement; Podemos
- Status: Announced: 21 November 2021; Official nominee: 27 July 2022; Official launch: 16 August 2022; Lost election: 2 October 2022
- Slogan: Brazil for Everyone

=== Announcement ===
Tebet presented herself as a candidate for the Presidency in the 2022 elections, standing on a Third Way platform. Her candidacy was seen as a non-controversial replacement to the failed pre-candidacies of João Doria, Eduardo Leite, and Sergio Moro, being supported by their former aides.

==== Supporters ====
In February, she announced economist Elena Landau as the campaign economic coordinator. Landau is known for her work in former President Fernando Henrique Cardoso's administration and for being part of LIVRES, a social liberal movement.

The Brazilian Democratic Movement, in a virtual convention, officialized on 27 July 2022 the candidacy of Tebet for President but the party was still split, as part of some leaderships endorsed Lula, but Tebet's candidacy has the support of the party's national president Baleia Rossi. After talks of some MDB factions with Lula, the party published a note signed by member of 19 states endorsing senator Tebet.

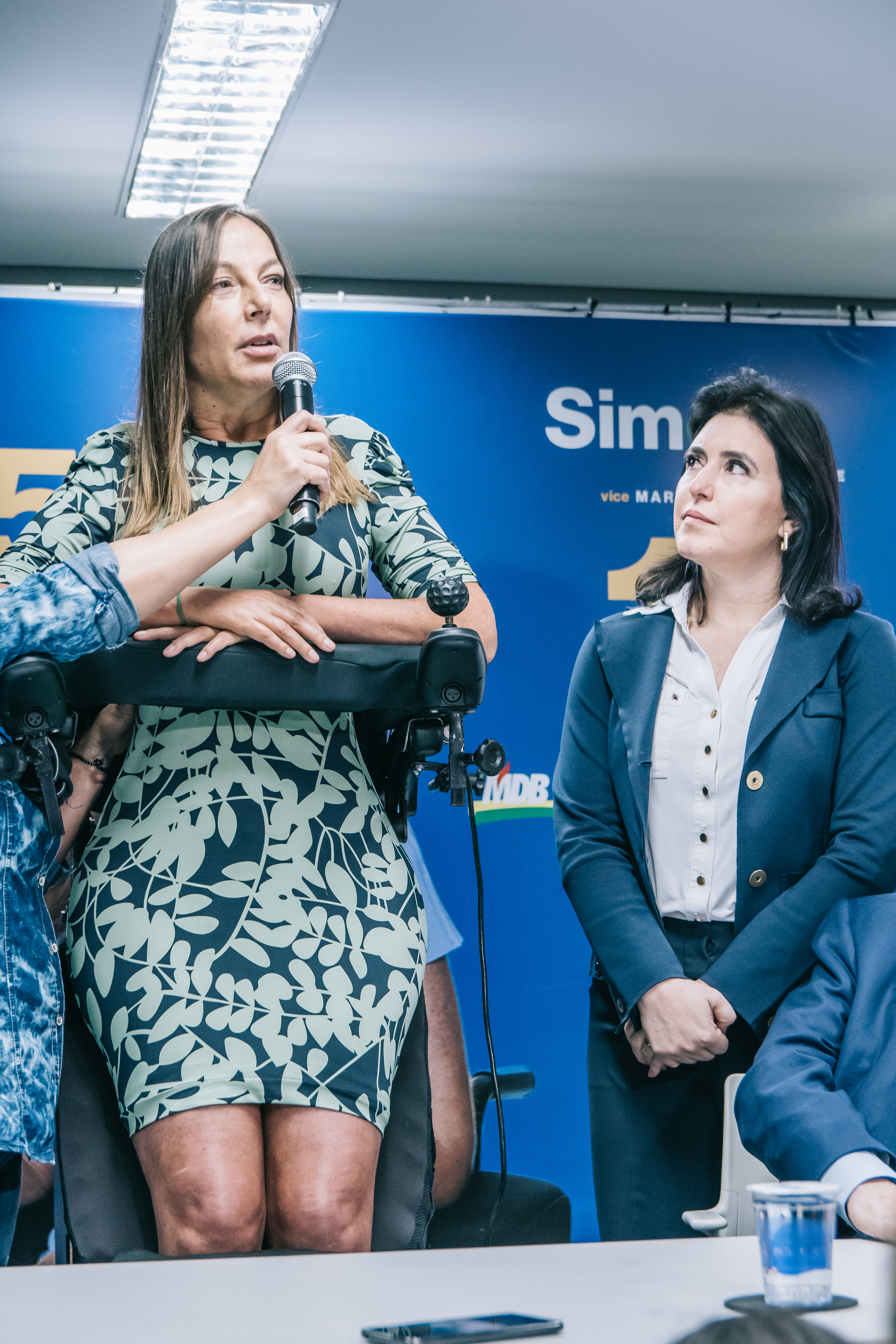
Tebet announcing Mara Gabrilli as vice-presidential candidate in 2022

===== Parties =====
The party formed a coalition with PSDB and Cidadania, nominating Mara Gabrilli, PSDB, a senator from São Paulo as vice president. Podemos also joined the coalition, after Sergio Moro left the party, abandoning his precandidacy, to run for senate in Paraná with the Brazil Union.

It is the first presidential election since 1994 that the PSDB has not nominated their own candidate.

==== Platform ====
Simone Tebet presented her government plan on 15 August, the last day for candidates to register their candidacy with the Electoral Justice. The document has 48 pages, where the presidential candidate proposes a permanent minimum income program, tax and administrative reforms and zero tolerance for illegal deforestation.

Her platform has been connected to what many view as issues more important to women such as the environment and education, and with this push, Tebet has portrayed herself as the candidate for women disaffected by Bolsonaro.

=== Results ===
Before the election, pundits expected Tebet to at most reach 6%. On 2 October 2022, Tebet failed to reach the run-off, garnering just 4.16% of the vote. She gained greater percentages in the North, South, and Southeast, especially in São Paulo, but faltered in the Northeast. However she passed Ciro Gomes to become the third place candidate and a kingmaker in the second round.

=== Endorsement of Lula ===
Tebet met with Geraldo Alckmin, Lula's running mate, on 4 October, presenting her governmental plan to his and Lula's campaign. While the Brazilian Democratic Movement released its members, with Governor Ibaneis Rocha of the Federal District endorsing Bolsonaro in the second round, citing the concern for democracy, Tebet endorsed Lula.

Other members of her coalition like Cidadania endorsed Lula while the PSDB and Podemos remaining neutral. Of the former presidents and presidential candidates that supported her candidacy, Fernando Henrique Cardoso and José Serra, both former supporters of Lula supported his candidacy, while Michel Temer supported Bolsonaro.

She also spoke against gun violence in South America on an Instagram post in her profile and how Lula can get rid of it by disarming the population from gun ownership and make streets of Brazil safer, and overturning right-wing gun policies. However, with all her support and the reward of a ministry in the Lula government, many suggest that she is building a platform for a more successful run in 2026, representing a disaffected center.

She switched to the Brazilian Socialist Party ahead of a run for Senate in São Paulo in 2026. She would be defeated in that election.

== Minister of Planning and Budget ==
Tebet was announced as Minister of Planning on 27 December 2022, after André Lara Resende, a member of the transition team, rejected the position. "Investors had expected a market-friendly person to get the position, but markets will welcome Tebet," said analyst Lucas de Aragao of Arko Advice consultancy in Brasilia.

The position also grants Tebet the position of Ex-Officio Alternate Member of the Board of Governors of the World Bank.

=== Choice of Ministry ===
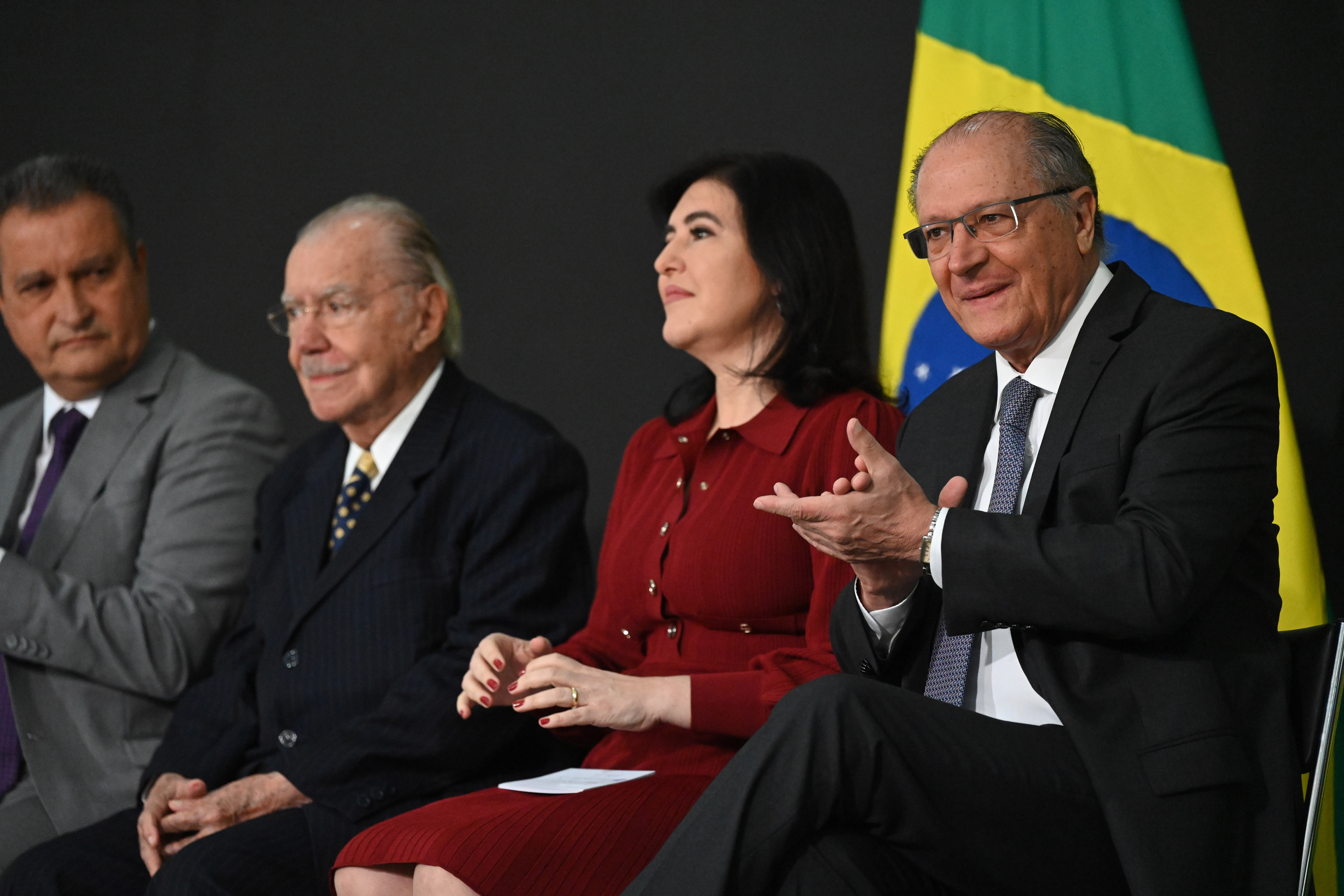
Tebet at her inauguration ceremony with Rui Costa, José Sarney, and Geraldo Alckmin

After the 2022 election, it was widely considered that Tebet would be given a ministry, especially since she had not run for reelection in the Senate. Tebet's support for Lula, especially as a moderate candidate was seen as crucial to his victory in the narrowest Brazilian presidential election in history, where she won 4.9 million votes and the election was decided by 2.1 million.

It was reported that Tebet desired the Ministry of Social Development, which would have allowed a large public profile to control the allocation of the Bolsa Família/Auxílio Brasil program. This appointment was quashed by the Workers' Party who worried about both Tebet's "independence" and the possibility of a future presidencial candidacy. Wellington Dias, the former Governor of Maranhão, was chosen for the position.

The Workers' Party wanted to give Tebet the Ministry of the Environment, but she wanted to give the ministry to her personal friend Marina Silva.

Eventually after considering the position of Minister of Cities and of Agriculture, Lula decided to give her the Ministry of Planning and Budget, just before his inauguration on 1 January.

=== Institutes ===
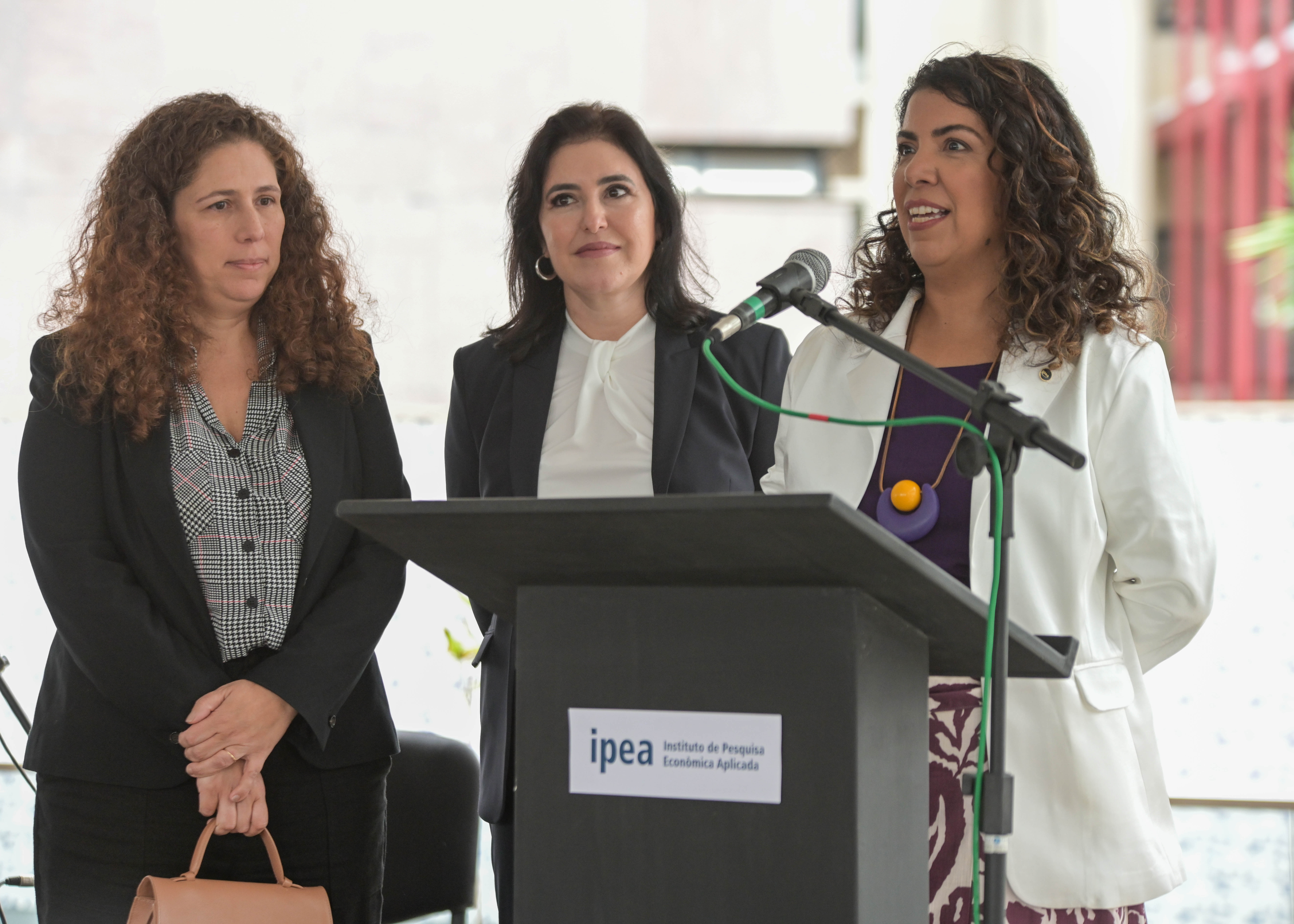
Tebet (center) with the President of IPEA Luciana Servo (right) and the Minister of Management Esther Dweck (left).

The two foundations under the preview of the Ministry of Planning and Budget are the Brazilian Institute of Geography and Statistics (IBGE) and the Institute of Applied Economic Research (IPEA).

==== IPEA ====
IPEA conducts economic research and studies.

Tebet appointed Dr. Luciana Mendes Santos Servo to head the IPEA. The IPEA carries out social and economic studies for the government as a whole. Dr. Sevro is the first black woman to head the foundation.

==== IGBE ====
IGBE conducts censuses and creates records of governmental and population statistics.

===== Leadership =====
Tebet also removed the head of IBGE from the Bolsonaro government, keeping Cimar Azeredo Pereira as head of the institute in an interim capacity. The previous head of IBGE Eduardo Luiz Gonçalves Rios Neto had not completed the 2022 census by the end of 2022.

The IBGE carried out a survey of indigenous lands during Tebet's tenure, after the recognition of the Yanomami humanitarian crisis caused by illegal logging and mining. The Bolsonaro and Temer governments had halted these surveys. The 2023 survey found only 53% of the Yanomami population had been recorded in the census fue to a lack of funding and remotness, leading to a further lack of access to government services. IBGE was applauded for locating 26,000 additional Yanomami in its survey.

===== Nomination of Marcio Pochmann =====
On 8 August 2023 President Lula appointed Marcio Pochmann, the former president of IPEA from 2007-2012 and president of the PT think tank the Perseu Abramo Foundation from 2012 to 2020, as President of IBGE.

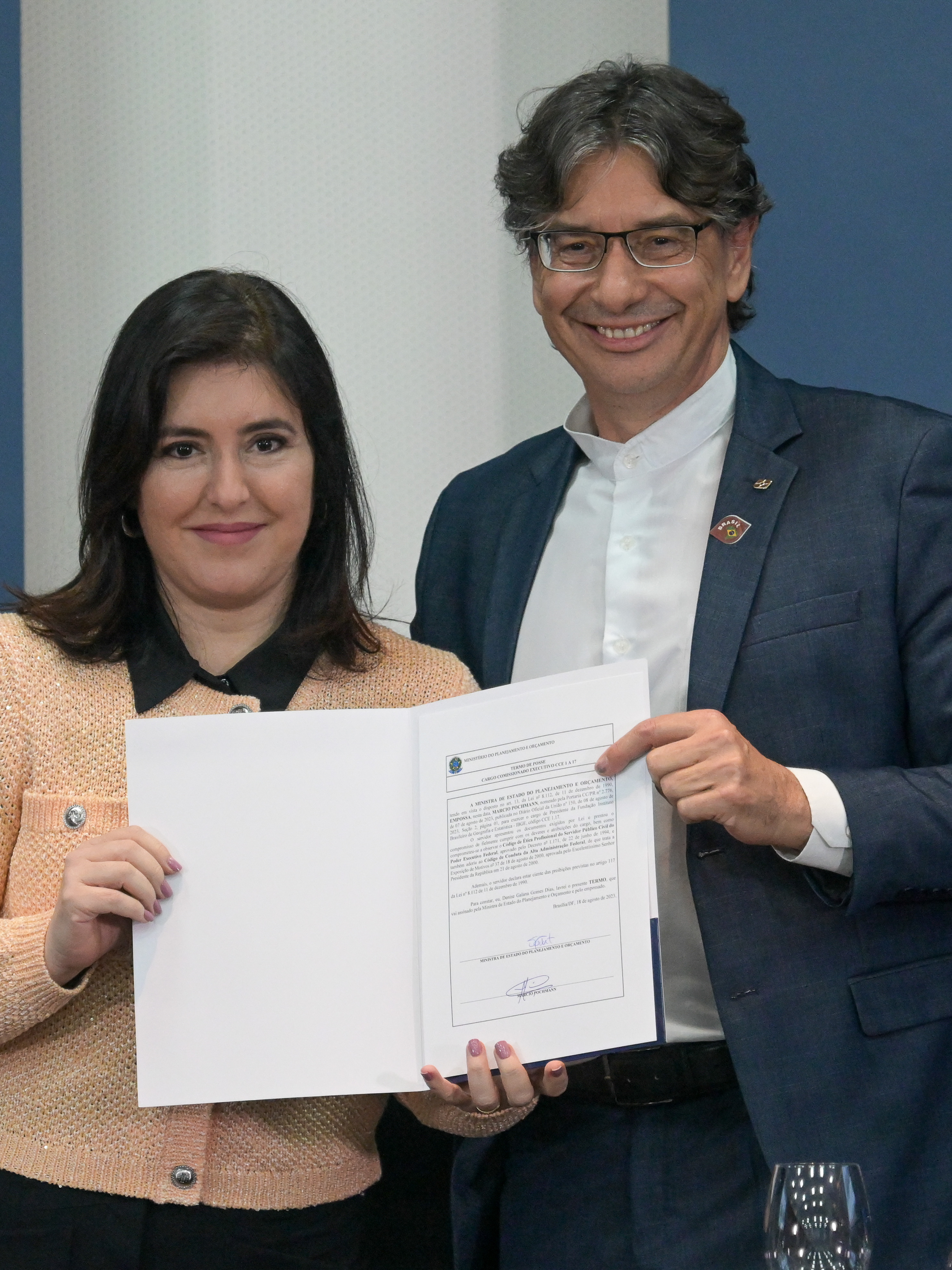
Tebet and Pochmann at his inauguration in 2023

Controversies emerged between Tebet and Lula over the nomination, as Tebet was not consulted. Tebet said in a statement that "Minister Pimenta, not knowing that in the meeting we had with the president we had not mentioned the name, announced it preliminarily. And it has already been placed. The name will be made official at the right time, after the conversation we will have next week with President Lula. We will accept any name that comes."

Pochmann is considered to hold heterodox economic theories. The Buenos Aires Times reported that Pochmann's leftist economic views are considered "too extreme even by members of Lula's economic team, who worry about damage to IBGE's credibility...after Pochmann's years at IPEA, [which] were controversial and caused several economists who did not agree with him to leave the organisation."

=== Fiscal policy in government ===
Tebet, along with the Minister of Finance Fernando Haddad, have taken a more pro-business stance than the rest of the Lula cabinet. Tebet has argued for reducing tax waivers and increasing female empowerment initiatives, arguing on a level playing field, equality increases economic prosperity.

Forbes Brasil reports that stock market and business leaders have shown support for Tebet's policies, which argue "economic stability depends on institutional stability."

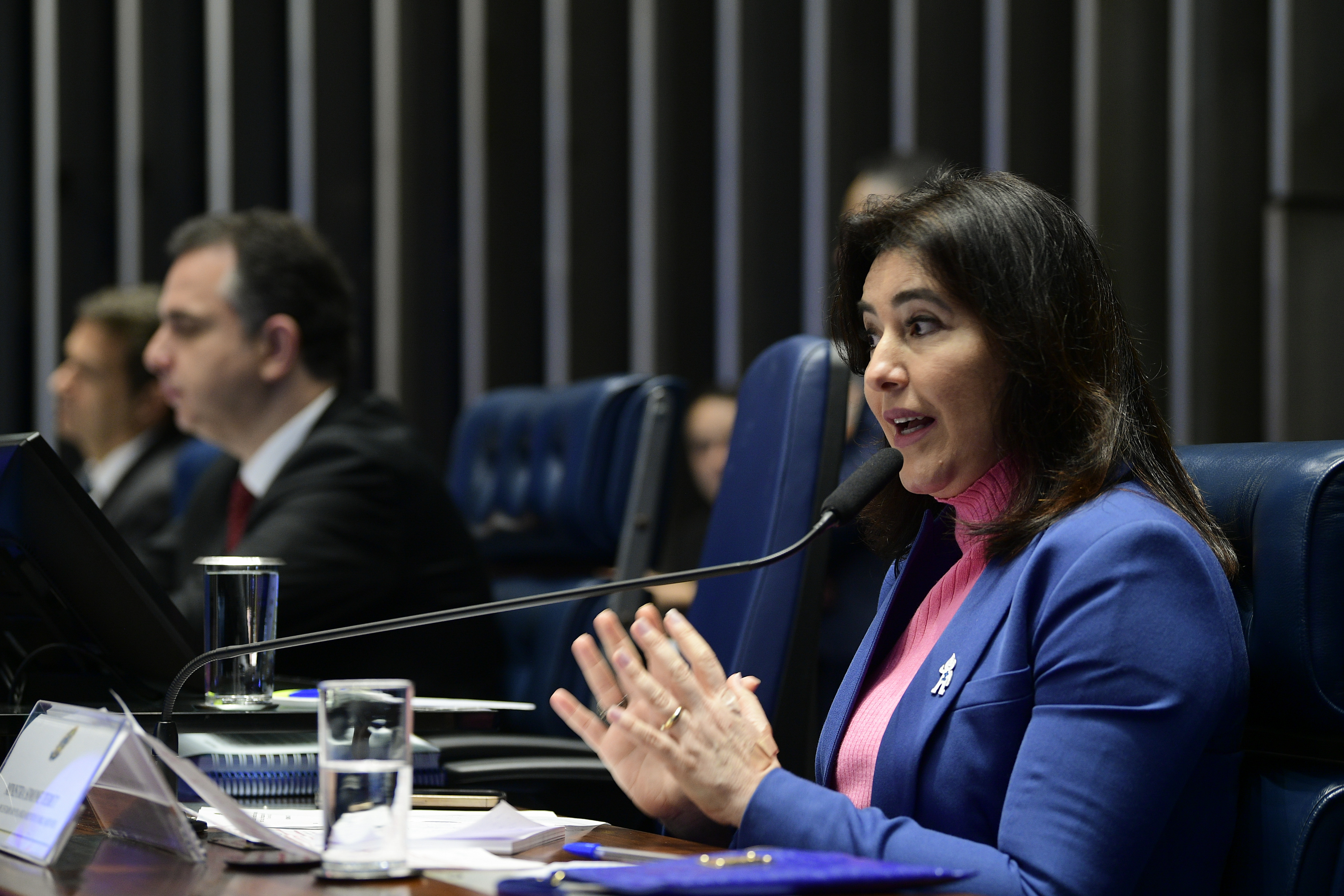
Tebet presenting to the Federal Senate on the Central Bank in April 2023

==== Central Bank ====
Roberto Campos Neto, the President of the Central Bank of Brazil appointed by Jair Bolsonaro, was criticized by various allies of the Lula government for not lowering interest rates. The PT bench in the Chamber of Deputies argued that inflation was low enough to increase access to loans. Gleisi Hoffmann, the PT president, said that the interest rate highs advantages the wealthy and disadvantaged the poor.

Campos Neto was defended by the Fazenda, a bloc of ministers that includes Tebet and other economic officials. This bloc includes Minister of Finance Fernando Haddad, Vice-President and Minister of Industry Geraldo Alckmin, and Minister of Management Esther Dweck.

Tebet took a neutral stance in a debate session of the Federal Senate, saying that "there is no contradiction in saying [interest rates should decrease]: the Central Bank is autonomous, and it is good that it is [...] And therefore, the government does not interfere in the technical decisions of the Central Bank. But the Central Bank cannot consider that its decisions are only techniques. They also interfere in politics, especially its communiqués and minutes." Tebet argued that tax reform could bring the budget deficit to zero, increasing GDP which would "guarantee Brazil's sustainable and lasting growth."

==== Budget ====
Tebet's office oversees budget proposals with input from the Ministry of Finance.

===== 2024 =====
Tebet supported the policy of Fernando Haddad in maintaining a zero deficit to raise confidence in market for the governments other spending. This was a policy that President Lula viewed as unattainable, while Haddad encouraged increased taxation to meet the deficit.

Tebet promised that these cuts to create a zero defict would not cut into environmental initiaves, offering emergency credits as a form of disaster spending to make up revenue to Marina Silva.

Tebet proposed a budget that required 168 billion reals in additional revenue.

===== 2025 =====
In the 2025 budget, Tebet entered into conflict with Haddad over maintaining a zero deficit goal. The Ministry of Finance had calculated a 0.5% surplus which would allow more spending but an independent review found a zero deficit, an observed win for Tebet's policy of fiscal responsibility over Haddad's observed market appeasement. Tebet's prioritization of a cohesive economic view was supported by experts.

== Political positions ==
Tebet has been described as a centre-right and centrist politician by the Brazilian media. During her presidential campaign, she said that she represents the "democratic center" and the "Third Way."

=== Women's rights ===
When Tebet assumed the leadership of the feminine caucus, she said that a "feminine perspective" is necessary for policy making in areas such as healthcare, education and public transportation.

In regards to women's policy, Tebet supports gender quotas for the Congress, saying that 50% is the ideal for all legislative bodies. In 2022, Tebet also pledged to have a gender balanced cabinet. Tebet opposes the legalization of abortion, but said that it should not be a political taboo. As leader of the feminine caucus, she voted against criminalizing abortion in cases of rape.

==== Feminism ====
Tebet considers herself to be a feminist, saying that women's rights should not be a left-wing theme. She has lamented the classification of feminism as a leftist movement, saying in the SBT debate to Padre Kelmon, a priest and candidate of the PTB, that:

My concept of a feminist is very different from yours. For me, being a feminist is defending women's rights. I am Catholic and I regret your selective view. I'm against abortion, and that doesn't make me any less of a feminist. Feminism in Brazil should be understood not as a leftist agenda, but as a Christian one.

She has been criticised by some on the left for using feminism as a "prop" without supporting true feminist causes like secularism and free access to abortion while others on the right have said that her purported Christianity is a mask for a more radical feminism. She has maintained her position to be one of Christian feminism.

Experts say that feminism has various currents and movements and Tebet represents a moderate but not anti-feminist position. However some have said that given some of her more conservative policy proposals she is no more feminist than many of the other candidates.

=== Land policy ===
While largely socially liberal, Tebet's policies have come into conflict with environmental regulation in the past.

==== Agricultural policy ====
Given Mato Grosso do Sul's deep involvement with Brazil's agricultural economy, Tebet has frequently been an activist for agribusiness. Her policies have been described as a balance between environmental policies and pro-agriculture policies. In a visit to Montes Claros, she said that:

"All regions have conditions to be fertile, to produce, to generate employment and income, the north of Minas is no different. What is lacking is the political will to definitively bring a large irrigation project so that the region can produce the fruits and export, generate employment and income, finishing the dams and guaranteeing dignity for its people."

— "Simone Tebet defende investir na irrigação do norte de Minas Gerais". Agência Brasil (in Brazilian Portuguese). 12 September 2022. Archived from the original on 1 October 2022.

Tebet has advocated for further irrigation into northern regions of Mato Grosso do Sul, where continued runoff is polluting the Amazon, and said "food needs to arrive faster and cheaper". Tebet also advocated for reduced protections for indigenous land, arguing such regulation infringe on farmers' right to farm.

==== Environmental policy ====
During her campaign for president Tebet has become a more frequent advocate for climate protections and controls. During the Globo debate she said to Bolsonaro that "Your administration is the one that made biomes, forests and my Pantanal wetlands burn. Your administration cared for miners and loggers, and protected them. You, in this regard, were the worst president in Brazil's history."

She has said that she wants a "zero tolerance policy" for illegal deforestation and advocated for increases in funding in Brazil's Northeast to produce solar and wind power on unused coasts and plains. Along with these investments, she said she planned to offer carbon credits and regulate fisheries to create a more sustainable system.

Her policies have been criticized for emphasizing investment rather than protection, while protecting harmful farms. She has disputed these claims, connecting deforestation to drought in Brazil's agricultural states.

Tebet is a friend of prominent environmentalist Marina Silva.

== Personal life ==
Tebet is married to Eduardo Rocha, a state deputy and secretary of the Civil House of Mato Grosso do Sul, in the government of Eduardo Riedel, with whom she has two daughters, Maria Eduarda and Maria Fernanda.

Tebet is Catholic. Tebet is of Lebanese origin, and has been very public and proud of her background.

== Electoral history ==
=== Direct elections ===
| Year | Election | Party | Office | Coalition | Partners | Party | Votes | Percent | Result | Ref. |
|---|---|---|---|---|---|---|---|---|---|---|
| 2002 | State Elections of Mato Grosso do Sul | MDB | State Deputy | For Mato Grosso do Sul Front (PMDB, PRTB, PSDB) | None | | 25,251 | 2.63% | Elected | |
| 2004 | Três Lagoas Mayoral Election | MDB | Mayor | Três Lagoas United (PMDB, PTB, PSDB, PL, PSL, PSC, PPS, PSB, PV, PTdoB) | Luiz Akira | PTB | 29,244 | 66.72% | Elected | |
| 2008 | Três Lagoas Mayoral Election | MDB | Mayor | For the Love of Três Lagoas (PMDB, PTB, PSDB, PL, PSL, PSC, PPS, PSB, PV, PTdoB) | Márcia Moura | MDB | 36,228 | 76.81% | Elected | |
| 2010 | Mato Grosso do Sul Gubernatorial Election | MDB | Vice-Governor | Love, Work, and Faith (PRB, PMDB, PR, DEM, PMN, PSB, PSDB, PRTB, PMN, PTC, PTdoB, PTB, PPS, PTN) | André Puccinelli | MDB | 704,407 | 56% | Elected; 1º Round | |
| 2014 | State Elections of Mato Grosso do Sul | MDB | Senator | Mato Grosso do Sul Ever Better (MDB, PSB, PTdoB, PSC, PHS, PRB, PRTB, PTN, PEN) | Celso Dal Lago | MDB | 640,336 | 52.61% | Elected | (Note: Dal Lago and Kohl were elected as alternates on the same ticket as Tebet.) |
| 2014 | State Elections of Mato Grosso do Sul | MDB | Senator | Mato Grosso do Sul Ever Better (MDB, PSB, PTdoB, PSC, PHS, PRB, PRTB, PTN, PEN) | Moacir Kohl | PSB | 640,336 | 52.61% | Elected | (Note: Dal Lago and Kohl were elected as alternates on the same ticket as Tebet.) |
| 2022 | Brazilian Presidential Election | MDB | President | Brazil for All (MDB, Always Forward (PSDB, Cidadania), PODE) | Mara Gabrilli | PSDB | 4,913,266 | 4.16% | Lost | |
| 2026 | State Elections of São Paulo | PSB | Senator | Wake Up São Paulo (Brazil of Hope (PT, PCdoB, PV), PSB, PSOL REDE Federation (PSOL, REDE), PDT) | Laio Morais | PT | 8,342,968 | 19.23% | Not elected | |
| 2026 | State Elections of São Paulo | PSB | Senator | Wake Up São Paulo (Brazil of Hope (PT, PCdoB, PV), PSB, PSOL REDE Federation (PSOL, REDE), PDT) | Marcelo Barbieri | PDT | 8,342,968 | 19.23% | Not elected | |
