= 2021 President of the Federal Senate of Brazil election =

- 1 February 2021

Needed to Win: Majority of the votes cast 78 votes cast, 40 needed for a majority
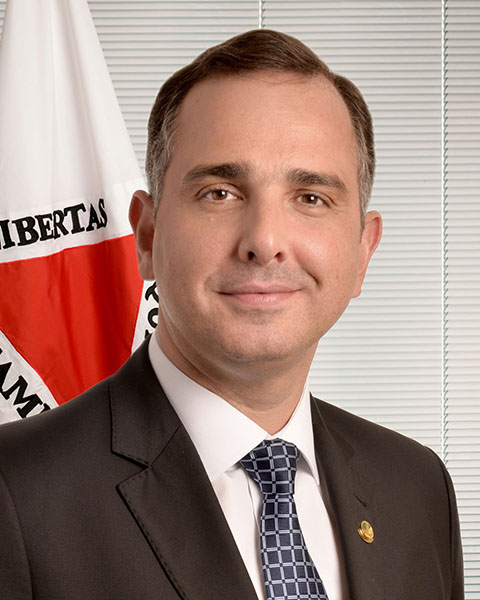

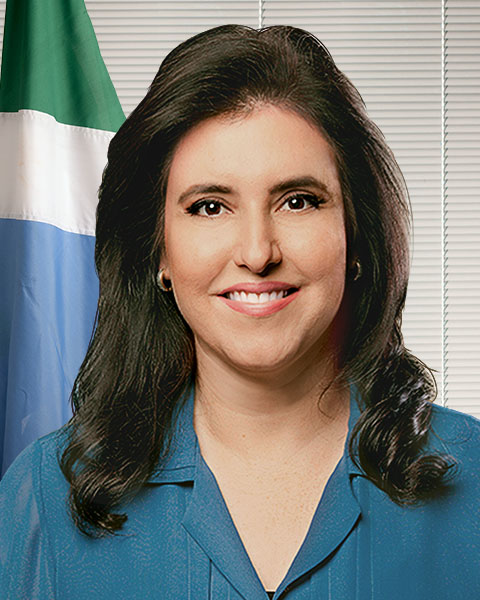
	Majority party	Minority party
Candidate	Rodrigo Pacheco	Simone Tebet
Party	DEM	MDB
Leader's seat	Minas Gerais	Mato Grosso do Sul
Members' vote	57	21
President before election
Davi Alcolumbre
DEM
Elected President
Rodrigo Pacheco
DEM

The 2021 President of the Federal Senate of Brazil election took place on 1 February 2021, during the opening day of the 3rd Session of the 56th Legislature of the National Congress.

Incumbent President Davi Alcolumbre can't run for re-election due to term limits.

Senator Rodrigo Pacheco (DEM-MG) won Senator Simone Tebet (MDB-MS) with 57 votes.

== Candidates ==
=== Confirmed candidates ===
- Rodrigo Pacheco (DEM-MG) - Senator for Minas Gerais since 2019; Federal Deputy from Minas Gerais 2015−19.
- Simone Tebet (MDB-MS) - Senator for Mato Grosso do Sul since 2015; State Secretary of Government of Mato Grosso do Sul 2013–14; Vice Governor of Mato Grosso do Sul 2011–15; Mayor of Três Lagoas 2005–10; State Deputy of Mato Grosso do Sul 2003–05.

=== Declined candidates ===
- Alvaro Dias (PODE-PR) - Senator for Paraná since 1999, 1983–87; Governor of Paraná 1987–91; Federal Deputy from Paraná 1975–83; State Deputy of Paraná 1971–75; City Councillor of Londrina 1969–71.
- Antonio Anastasia (PSD-MG) - Senator for Minas Gerais since 2015; 1st Vice President of the Federal Senate since 2019; Governor of Minas Gerais 2011–14; Vice Governor of Minas Gerais 2007–10; Acting Minister of Labour 1998.

=== Lost in convention ===
- Eduardo Braga (MDB-AM) - Senator for Amazonas since 2011; Minister of Mines and Energy 2015–16; Governor of Amazonas 2003–10; Mayor of Manaus 1994–97; Vice Mayor of Manaus 1993–97; Federal Deputy from Amazonas 1991–93; State Deputy of Amazonas 1987–91.
- Eduardo Gomes (MDB-TO) - Senator for Tocantins since 2019; State Secretary of Governorship of Tocantins 2019; Federal Deputy from Tocantins 2003–15; City Councillor of Palmas 1997–2003.
- Fernando Bezerra Coelho (MDB-PE) - Senator for Pernambuco since 2015; Minister of National Integration 2011–13; Mayor of Petrolina 2001–06, 1993–97; Federal Deputy from Pernambuco 1987–92; State Deputy of Pernambuco 1983–87.
- Jorge Kajuru (CDN-GO) - Senator for Goiás since 2019; City Councillor of Goiânia 2017–19.
- Lasier Martins (PODE-RS) - Senator for Rio Grande do Sul since 2015; 2nd Vice President of the Federal Senate since 2019.
- Sérgio Olímpio (PSL-SP) - Senator for São Paulo since 2019; Federal Deputy from São Paulo 2015–19; State Deputy of São Paulo 2007–15.

=== Endorsements ===
Rodrigo Pacheco (DEM-MG)

Brazil Presidents

- Jair Bolsonaro, 38th President of Brazil (2019–2023)

Federal Senate

- Davi Alcolumbre (DEM-AP), President of the Senate (2019−2021)
- Sen. Izalci Lucas (PSDB-DF)
- Sen. Plínio Valério (PSDB-AM)
- Sen. Roberto Rocha (PSDB-MA)
- Sen. Rodrigo Cunha (PSDB-AL)
- Sen. Rogério Carvalho (PT-SE)
- Sen. Jaques Wagner (PT-BA)

Political parties

- Social Democratic Party (PSD)
- Progressistas (PP)
- Workers' Party (PT)
- Democrats (DEM)
- Democratic Labour Party (PDT)
- Republican Party of the Social Order (PROS)
- Republicanos
- Liberal Party (PL)
- Social Christian Party (PSC)
Simone Tebet (MDB-MS)

Federal Senate

- Sen. José Serra (PSDB-SP)
- Sen. Mara Gabrilli (PSDB-SP)
- Sen. Tasso Jereissati (PSDB-CE)

Political parties

- Brazilian Democratic Movement (MDB)
- Podemos (PODE)
- Cidadania
- Social Liberal Party (PSL)
- Sustainability Network (REDE)

== Predictions ==
Estadão prediction
Pacheco: 41	Others/No ans./Not found: 12	Tebet: 27
▲

Pollster	Pacheco DEM	Tebet MDB	Others	No ans./ Not found	Lead
Estadão	41	27	3	10	14

== Formal voting ==
=== President ===
Candidate	Party	Votes	%
Rodrigo Pacheco (MG) ✓	DEM	57	73.08
Simone Tebet (MS)	MDB	21	26.92
Total		78	100.00
Valid votes		78	100.00
Invalid/blank votes		0	0.00
Total votes		78	100.00
Registered voters/turnout		81	96.30

=== First Vice President ===
Candidate	Party	Votes	%
Veneziano Vital do Rêgo (PB) ✓	MDB	40	54.79
Lucas Barreto (AP)	PSD	33	45.21
Total		73	100.00
Valid votes		73	100.00
Invalid/blank votes		0	0.00
Total votes		73	100.00
Registered voters/turnout		81	90.12

=== Others ===
A single ticket composed by senators Romário Faria (PODE-RJ), Irajá Abreu (PSD-TO), Elmano Férrer (PP-CE), Rogério Carvalho (PT-SE), Weverton Rocha (PDT-MA), Jorginho Mello (PL-SC), Luiz do Carmo (MDB-GO) and Eliziane Gama (Cidadania-MA) for Second Vice President, four Secretaries and three Substitutes, respectively.

Election of Senate Director's Board
Ballot →	2 February 2021	
Required majority →	Simple	
Yes	64 / 81	check
No	0 / 81	
Blank ballots	8 / 81	
Invalid ballots	1 / 81	
Absentees	8 / 81	
