= Eduardo Rocha =

Brazilian politician

Secretary of the Civil House of Mato Grosso do Sul
- Incumbent
- Assumed office 1 January 2023
- Governor: Eduardo Riedel
- Preceded by: Sérgio de Paula

Secretary of State for Government and Strategic Management of Mato Grosso do Sul
- In office 3 December 2021 – 1 January 2023
- Governor: Reinaldo Azambuja

State deputy of Mato Grosso do Sul
- Incumbent
- Assumed office 2 February 2011

Personal details
- Born: João Eduardo Barbosa Rocha; 30 September 1966 (age 59) Birigui, Brazil
- Party: Brazilian Democratic Movement
- Spouse: Simone Tebet (m. 1996)
- Children: 2

Eduardo Rocha (born 30 September 1966) is a Brazilian politician who serves as Secretary of the Civil House of Mato Grosso do Sul, in the government of Eduardo Riedel, as well as a state deputy for Mato Grosso do Sul since 2011, he is married to Simone Tebet, a minister in the Government Lula da Silva.

Eduardo also served as Secretary of State for Government and Strategic Management from December 3, 2021 to January 1, 2023, during the government of Reinaldo Azambuja.

== Biography ==
Born in the city of Birigui, in São Paulo, Eduardo moved with his family – father, mother and two sisters – to Três Lagoas, in Mato Grosso do Sul, at the age of two.

== Formation ==
In 1996, he graduated from the Faculty of Economics in Andradina and married Simone Tebet, now Minister of Planning, Development and Management, with whom he had two daughters.

== Career ==
He acted as a parliamentary advisor to his father-in-law, senator Ramez Tebet and took care of his office in the capital Campo Grande. When his wife was elected mayor of Três Lagoas, he returned to the city.

In 2010, he was elected state deputy with 25,428 votes, being re-elected in 2014 with 30,873 votes and, in 2018, with 22,347 votes. He was leader of the Brazilian Democratic Movement bench in the Assembly from 2011 to 2019, leaving office when he was elected vice president of Legislative Assembly of Mato Grosso do Sul.

On December 3, 2021, he was appointed Secretary of State for Government and Strategic Management by Governor Reinaldo Azambuja, a position he held until January 1, 2023.

On January 1, 2023, he was appointed Secretary of the Civil House of Mato Grosso do Sul, by governor Eduardo Riedel.
