= Miss Brazil World 2008 =

Beauty pageant edition

- Date: July 26, 2008
- Presenters: Francisco Budal; Jana Macêdo
- Venue: Eco Resort, Angra dos Reis, Rio de Janeiro, Brazil
- Broadcaster: TV Climatempo; SKY
- Entrants: 10
- Placements: 10
- Winner: Tamara Almeida; Minas Gerais
- Congeniality: Renata Lustosa; Piauí

Miss Brazil World 2008 was the 19th edition of the Miss Brazil World pageant and 3rd under MMB Productions & Events. The contest took place on July 26, 2008. Ten contestants, that competed in both 2006 and 2007 editions were selected to compete in this years contest. Regiane Andrade of Santa Catarina crowned Tamara Almeida of Minas Gerais at the end of the contest. Almeida represented Brazil at Miss World 2008. The contest was held at the Eco Resort in Angra dos Reis, Rio de Janeiro, Brazil.

== Results ==
Final results	Contestant
Miss Brazil World 2008	Minas Gerais - Tamara Almeida
1st Runner-Up	Umuarama, Paraná - Vivian Noronha
2nd Runner-Up	Maringá, Paraná - Anelize Garcia
3rd Runner-Up	Rio Grande do Sul - Geise Werzenska
4th Runner-Up	Campos dos Goytacazes, Rio de Janeiro - Nayara Lima
Top 10	Espírito Santo - Aline Avancini; Jandaia do Sul, Paraná - Amanda Bocchi; Pernambuco - Leila Roots; Piauí - Renata Lustosa; São Gonçalo, Rio de Janeiro - Alessandra Lopes

=== Special awards ===
Award	Winner
Miss Cordiality	Piauí - Renata Lustosa
Miss Creativity	Piauí - Renata Lustosa
Miss Elegance	Maringá, Paraná - Anelize Garcia
Miss Friendship	Piauí - Renata Lustosa
Miss Popularity UOL	Piauí - Renata Lustosa
Miss Press	Umuarama, Paraná - Vivian Noronha

== Challenge Events ==
=== Beach Beauty Brazil ===
Final results	Contestant
Winner	Umuarama, Paraná - Vivian Noronha
1st Runner-Up	Minas Gerais - Tamara Almeida
2nd Runner-Up	Maringá, Paraná - Anelize Garcia

== Contestants ==
The contestants for Miss Brazil World 2008 were:

- Campos dos Goytacazes, Rio de Janeiro - Nayara Lima
- Espírito Santo - Aline Avancini
- Jandaia do Sul, Paraná - Amanda Bocchi
- Maringá, Paraná - Anelize Garcia
- Minas Gerais - Tamara Almeida
- Pernambuco - Leila Roots
- Piauí - Renata Lustosa
- Rio Grande do Sul - Geise Werzenska
- São Gonçalo, Rio de Janeiro - Alessandra Lopes
- Umuarama, Paraná - Vivian Noronha
