= Miss Brazil World 2007 =

- Date: September 22, 2007
- Presenters: Francisco Budal
- Venue: Barueri Municipal Theatre, Barueri, São Paulo, Brazil
- Broadcaster: Rede Brasil
- Entrants: 27
- Placements: 17
- Winner: Regiane Andrade; Santa Catarina
- Congeniality: Vanessa Lopes; São Paulo
- Photogenic: Tamara Almeida; Espírito Santo

Miss Brazil World 2007 was the 18th edition of the Miss Brazil World pageant and 2nd under MMB Productions & Events. The contest took place on September 22, 2007. Each state, the Federal District and Fernando de Noronha competed for the title. Jane Borges of Goiânia, Goiás crowned Regiane Andrade of Santa Catarina at the end of the contest. Andrade represented Brazil at Miss World 2007. The contest was held at the Barueri Municipal Theatre in Barueri, São Paulo, Brazil.

== Results ==
Final results	Contestant
Miss Brazil World 2007	Santa Catarina - Regiane Andrade
1st Runner-Up	Rio Grande do Sul - Mel Fronckowiak
2nd Runner-Up	Paraná - Kelly Giacomoni
3rd Runner-Up	Espírito Santo - Tamara Almeida
4th Runner-Up	Sergipe - Mariana Bridi
5th Runner-Up	Pernambuco - Rayanne Oliveira
Top 17	Bahia - Renata Lustosa; Fernando de Noronha - Fabiana Medeiros; Mato Grosso do Sul - Isabelle Sánchez; Minas Gerais - Rafaela Vartuli; Pará - Ivete Rodrigues; Paraíba - Morgana Araújo; Piauí - Samara Carvalho; Rio de Janeiro - Nayara Lima; Rio Grande do Norte - Geise Werzenska; Rondônia - Angelita Botelho; São Paulo - Vanessa Lopes

=== Regional Queens of Beauty ===
Award	Winner
Miss Midwest	Mato Grosso do Sul - Isabelle Sánchez
Miss North	Rondônia - Angelita Botelho
Miss Northeast	Sergipe - Mariana Bridi
Miss South	Rio Grande do Sul - Melanie "Mel" Nunes Fronckowiak
Miss Southeast	Espírito Santo - Tamara Almeida

=== Special awards ===
Award	Winner
AeroSur Girl	Pernambuco - Rayanne Oliveira
Miss Cordiality	Piauí - Samara Carvalho
Miss Elegance	Amapá - Danielle Morais
Miss Friendship	São Paulo - Vanessa Lopes
Miss Personality	Rio Grande do Sul - Melanie "Mel" Nunes Fronckowiak
Miss Photogenic	Espírito Santo - Tamara Almeida
The Most Beautiful Dress	Tocantins - Janete Mattos
The Most Beautiful Face	Pernambuco - Rayanne Oliveira

== Challenge Events ==
=== Beauty with a Purpose ===
Final results	Contestant
Winner	São Paulo - Vanessa Lopes
1st Runner-Up	Piauí - Samara Carvalho
Top 6	Paraíba - Morgana Araújo; Paraná - Kelly Giacomoni; Pernambuco - Rayanne Oliveira; Sergipe - Mariana Bridi

=== Miss Popularity UOL ===
Final results	Contestant
Winner	Fernando de Noronha - Fabiana Medeiros

Note: Fabiana Medeiros won the Popularity Vote with 23.28% of the vote.

=== Modelo Brasil Mundo L'Équipe ===
Final results	Contestant
Winner	Minas Gerais - Rafaela Vartuli
1st Runner-Up	Mato Grosso do Sul - Isabelle Sánchez
2nd Runner-Up	Pará - Ivete Rodrigues
Top 6	Espírito Santo - Tamara Almeida; Rondônia - Angelita Botelho; Sergipe - Mariana Bridi
Top 9	Acre - Jamila Fernandes; Bahia - Renata Lustosa; Paraná - Kelly Giacomoni
Top 14	Distrito Federal - Poliana Queiroz; Fernando de Noronha - Fabiana Medeiros; Pernambuco - Rayanne Oliveira; Rio Grande do Norte - Geise Werzenska; Santa Catarina - Regiane Andrade

== Delegates ==
The delegates for Miss Brazil World 2007 were:

- Acre - Jamila Maria dos Santos Fernandes
- Alagoas - Kelmy Santos Barcelos
- Amapá - Danielle Moura Morais
- Amazonas - Hinajara Corityac Jorio
- Bahia - Renata Bruna Lustosa Mororó
- Ceará - Laura Micaela Leite Mendes
- Distrito Federal - Poliana Marins Queiroz
- Espírito Santo - Tamara Almeida Silva
- Fernando de Noronha - Fabiana dos Santos Medeiros
- Goiás - Kamila do Nascimento Leão
- Maranhão - Nilsênia Maria Luz Gomes
- Mato Grosso - Samara Valêncio de Melo
- Mato Grosso do Sul - Isabelle Gabriel Sánchez
- Minas Gerais - Rafaela Cordeiro Vartuli
- Pará - Ivete Rodrigues da Silva
- Paraíba - Morgana de Vasconcellos Araújo
- Paraná - Kelly Pedrita Giacomoni
- Pernambuco - Rayanne Vieira de Oliveira
- Piauí - Samara Araújo de Carvalho
- Rio de Janeiro - Nayara Lima da Silva
- Rio Grande do Norte - Geise Werzenska dos Santos
- Rio Grande do Sul - Melanie "Mel" Nunes Fronckowiak
- Rondônia - Angelita Botelho
- Roraima - Suellen de Andrade
- Santa Catarina - Regiane Andrade
- São Paulo - Vanessa Cardoso Lopes
- Sergipe - Mariana Bridi Costa
- Tocantins - Janete Soares de Mattos

== Notes ==
=== Replacements ===
- Amapá - Mayara Sussuarana was replaced by Danielle Morais
- Espírito Santo - Ariane Colombo was replaced by Tamara Almeida
- Goiás - Amanda Maia was replaced by Kamila Leão
- Mato Grosso - Flávia Piana was replaced by Samara Valêncio
- Mato Grosso do Sul - Cissa Stolariki was replaced by Isabelle Sánchez
- Piauí - Ingrid Silveira was replaced by Samara Carvalho
- Rio Grande do Sul - Fernanda Dornelles was replaced by Melanie Nunes Fronckowiak
- Roraima - Daniela Mouta was originally replaced by Kahena Gallerani but then Gallerani withdrew and the new replacement was Suellen de Andrade
- Sergipe - Aline Buzato was replaced by Mariana Bridi Costa
