= Luciana Servo =

Brazilian economist and researcher

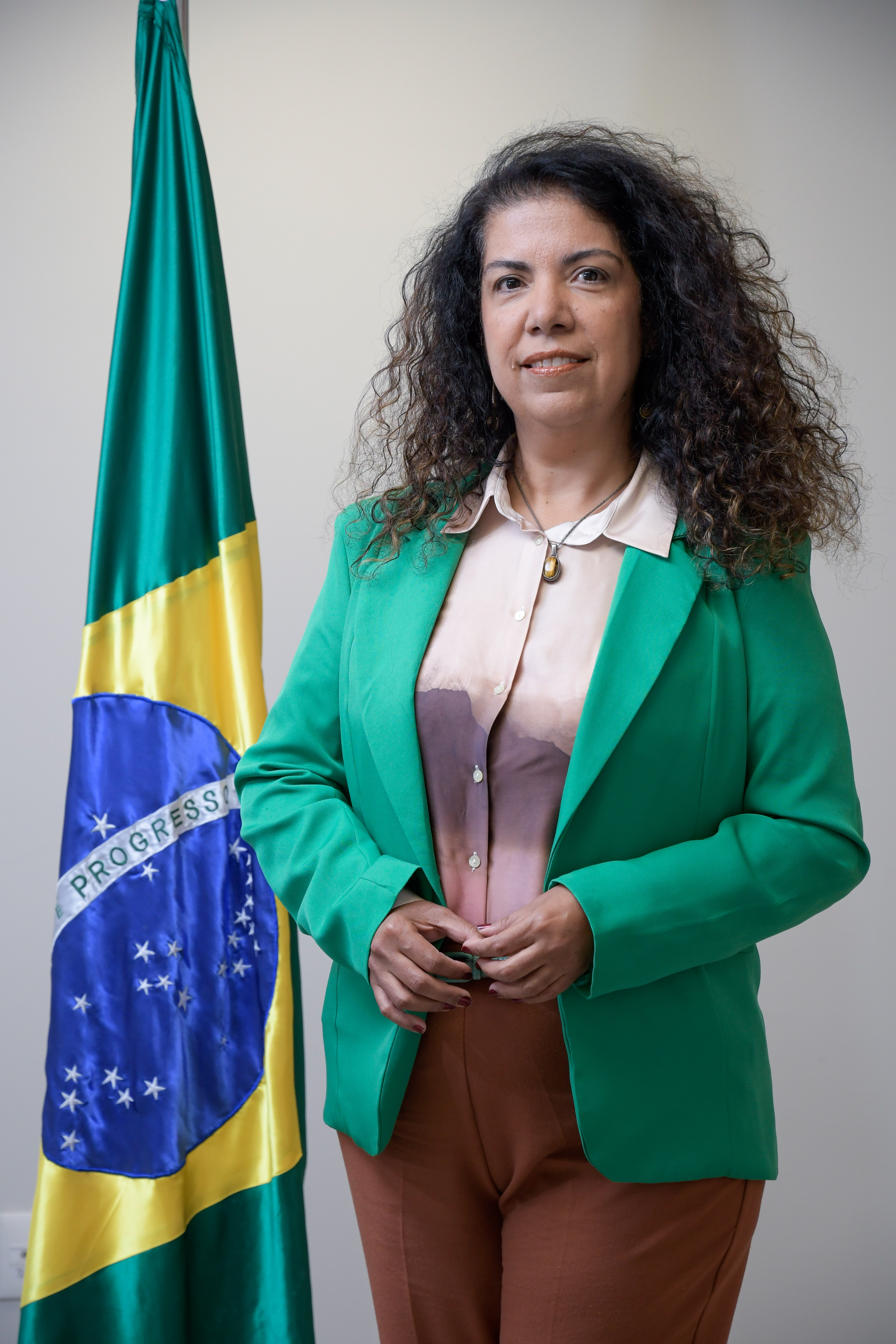
- Luciana Servo in June 2023

President of the IPEA
- Incumbent
- Assumed office 15 February 2023
- President: Luiz Inácio Lula da Silva
- Minister: Simone Tebet
- Preceded by: Erik Alencar de Figueiredo

Personal details
- Education: Federal University of Minas Gerais; University of São Paulo
- Profession: Economist

Luciana Mendes Santos Servo is a Brazilian economist and researcher. Servo has been the President of the Institute of Applied Economic Research (IPEA) since February 2023 when she was appointed by the Minister of Planning Simone Tebet.

== Early career ==
Servo received a doctorate in economics from the Federal University of Minas Gerais and a masters in economics from the University of São Paulo.

Servo began working at IPEA in 1998 and has participated largely in studies of health policy, coauthoring reports by the Council for Monitoring and Evaluation of Public Policies (CMAP) which evaluated hospital bed and ventilator availability during the COVID-19 pandemic in Brazil.

== President of IPEA ==
Servo is the third woman and first Black person to lead IPEA.

=== Nomination ===
Servo was announced as President of IPEA on January 20, 2023, and was inaugurated on February 15, 2023.

Servo's nomination came after a controversy with Simone Tebet where she said that in the Ministry of Planning, she " want[s] not only to have women, but black women. And we know, regrettably, that black women are usually the breadwinners of the family. Bringing people from outside Brasilia is very difficult because wages are very low."

Tebet was criticized by Anielle Franco, the Minister of Racial Equality, who offered a list of black economists to work for Tebet. From this list, Tebet chose Servo.

==== Inauguration ====
Her inauguration was attended by Tebet and the Minister of Management Esther Dweck.

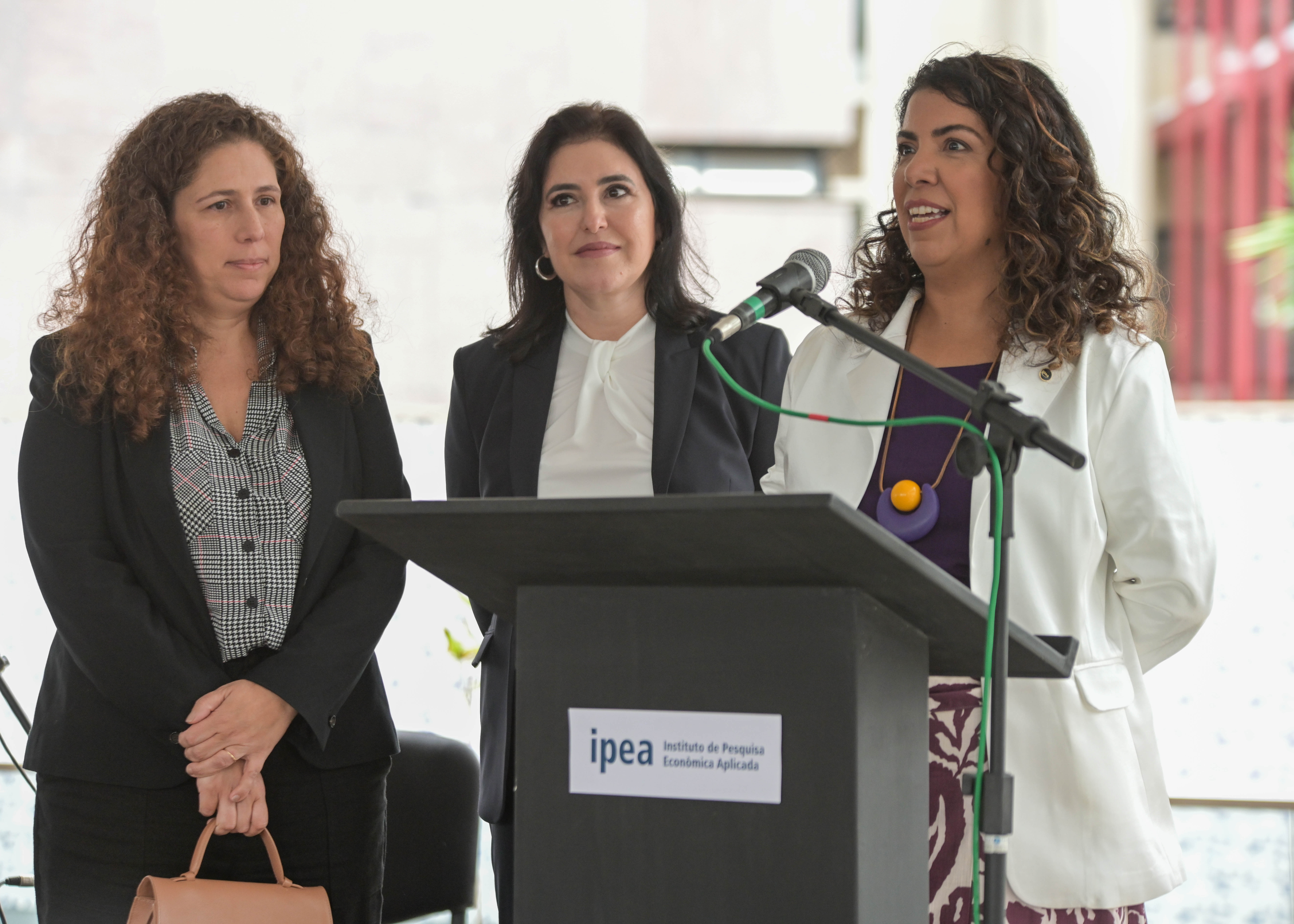
Servo with Dweck (left) and Tebet (center) at her inauguration in 2023

Tebet said at her inauguration “Today we have a Ministry of Planning that is presenting the nautical chart to Brazil. We are going to do the PPA [Pluriannual plan] alongside Ipea, Enap [National School of Public Administration], commanded by Minister Esther Dweck, and the IBGE”.

Servo honored Marielle Franco at her inauguration, whose assassination was 5 years old that day. Servo said that “it is unacceptable that, in the 21st century, a woman is murdered for defending the rights of the blackest population and the poorest population, or that she is oppressed as a result of her struggle and political action."

In addition to Tebet and Dweck, the ceremony was attended by the national secretary of Planning, Leany Lemos, and the executive secretary of the Ministry of Human Rights and Citizenship, Rita Cristina de Oliveira.

=== Tenure ===
Servo has emphasized racial equality and gender equality in her tenure but has also attempted to make IPEA a more apolitical organization, while engaging in more present public debate. Servo said that IPEA's role "is not to answer what the government wants to hear, it is to qualify the debate. Let IPEA contribute to the immediate debate, but the idea is to set agendas that go beyond a government cycle."

Among the studies that have been carried out under Servo's leadership, IPEA found that free transportation in cities did not increase turnout in the 2022 Brazilian general election and that COVID-19 accelerated Brazil's transition to population decline.

== See also ==
- Simone Tebet
- Ministry of Planning, Budget and Management
- Institute of Applied Economic Research
- Brazilian Institute of Geography and Statistics
- Second presidency of Lula da Silva
