= Miss Brazil World 2006 =

- Date: July 30, 2006
- Presenters: Francisco Budal; Angélica Beliche; Valquíria Melnik; Didi Caillet
- Venue: Music Channel Auditorium, Curitiba, Paraná, Brazil
- Broadcaster: CNT
- Entrants: 41
- Placements: 24
- Winner: Jane Borges; Goiânia
- Congeniality: Tássia Oliveira; Joaquim Nabuco
- Photogenic: Margrid Holschuh; Taboão da Serra

Miss Brazil World 2006 was the 17th edition of the Miss Brazil World pageant and 1st under MMB Productions & Events. The contest took place on July 30, 2006. Representatives from various cities all throughout Brazil competed for the Brazilian crown for Miss World. Jane Borges of Goiânia, Goiás was crowned Miss Brazil World at the end of the contest by Miss World 2005, Unnur Birna Vilhjálmsdóttir of Iceland. Borges succeeded outgoing titleholder Patrícia Reginato of Paraná. Borges represented Brazil at Miss World 2006. The contest was held at the Music Channel Auditorium in Curitiba, Paraná, Brazil.

== Results ==
Final results	Contestant
Miss Brazil World 2006	Goiânia - Jane Borges
1st Runner-Up	Cuiabá - Vanessa de Jesus
2nd Runner-Up	Ouro Preto - Tamara Almeida
3rd Runner-Up	Guarapari - Mariana Bridi
4th Runner-Up	Pinhais - Clarissa Caetano
Top 10	Astorga - Ana Paula Apolônio; Balneário Camboriú - Daniela Martins; Joinville - Larissa Reinert Minatto; Maringá - Anelize Garcia; Umuarama - Vivian Noronha Cia
Top 24	Belo Horizonte - Carla Lara; Brasília - Patrícia Lírio; Curitiba - Priscila Ghedin; Florianópolis - Michele Koerich; Foz do Iguaçu - Janaína Macêdo; Jaboatão dos Guararapes - Leila Roots; Jandaia do Sul - Amanda Bocchi; Niterói - Alessandra Paulino; Palotina - Paola Lettrari; Porto Alegre - Catiane Menezes; Toledo - Thays Rosa; Três Lagoas - Caroline Alcamin; Venâncio Aires - Daniela Silva; Vitória - Aline Avancini

=== Special awards ===
Award	Winner
Miss Cordiality	Três Lagoas - Caroline Martins Alcamin
Miss Elegance	Ouro Preto - Tamara Almeida
Miss Friendship	Joaquim Nabuco - Tássia Oliveira
Miss Personality	Venâncio Aires - Daniela Silva de Azeredo
Miss Photogenic	Taboão da Serra - Margrid Holschuh
The Most Beautiful Body	Jaboatão dos Guararapes - Leila Roots
The Most Beautiful Face	Maringá - Anelize Garcia

== Challenge Events ==
=== Beauty with a Purpose ===
Final results	Contestant
Winner	Três Lagoas - Caroline Martins Alcamin
1st Runner-Up	Manaus - Natascha Barbosa
2nd Runner-Up	Brasília - Patrícia Lírio
Top 5	Curitiba - Priscila Ghedin; Jandaia do Sul - Amanda Bocchi

=== Miss Talent ===
Final results	Contestant
Winner	Astorga - Ana Paula Apolônio
Top 4	João Monlevade - Tamara Lacerda; Manaus - Natascha Barbosa; Três Lagoas - Caroline Alcamin

== Delegates ==
The delegates for Miss Brazil World 2006 were:

- Astorga - Ana Paula Apolônio
- Balneário Camboriú - Daniela Martins
- Belo Horizonte - Carla Lara
- Brasília - Patrícia Lírio
- Campo Grande - Nádia Bronze
- Canela - Anny Foerster
- Canoas - Bruna Soares Sawatori
- Cascavel - Eliane Dias
- Cuiabá - Vanessa de Jesus
- Curitiba - Priscila Ghedin
- Florianópolis - Michele Koerich
- Fortaleza - Juliana de Sousa Meireles
- Foz do Iguaçu - Janaína Macêdo
- Guarapari - Mariana Bridi
- Goiânia - Jane Borges
- Itapoá - Pâmela Cristina Neves
- Jaboatão dos Guararapes - Leila Roots
- Jandaia do Sul - Amanda Bocchi
- João Monlevade - Tamara Lacerda
- Joaquim Nabuco - Tássia Oliveira
- Joinville - Larissa Reinert Minatto
- Manaus - Natascha Barbosa
- Marechal Floriano - Jakeline Lemke
- Maringá - Anelize Garcia
- Niterói - Alessandra Paulino Lopes da Silva
- Ouro Preto - Tamara Almeida
- Palotina - Paola Lettrari
- Pato Branco - Ana Luiza Horn
- Pinhais - Clarissa Majoriê Caetano
- Piraquara - Nilza Karla Beetz de Faria
- Porto Alegre - Catiane Menezes
- Recife - Eveline Aragão de Albuquerque
- Rio de Janeiro - Danielle Brito
- Salvador - Loraine Navarro Gimenez
- Taboão da Serra - Margrid Holschuh
- Tangará - Patrícia Borges Camargo
- Toledo - Thays Rosa
- Três Lagoas - Caroline Alcamin
- Umuarama - Vivian Noronha Cia
- Venâncio Aires - Daniela Silva
- Vitória - Aline Avancini
