= Jessé Souza =

Brazilian sociologist

Jessé José Freire de Souza
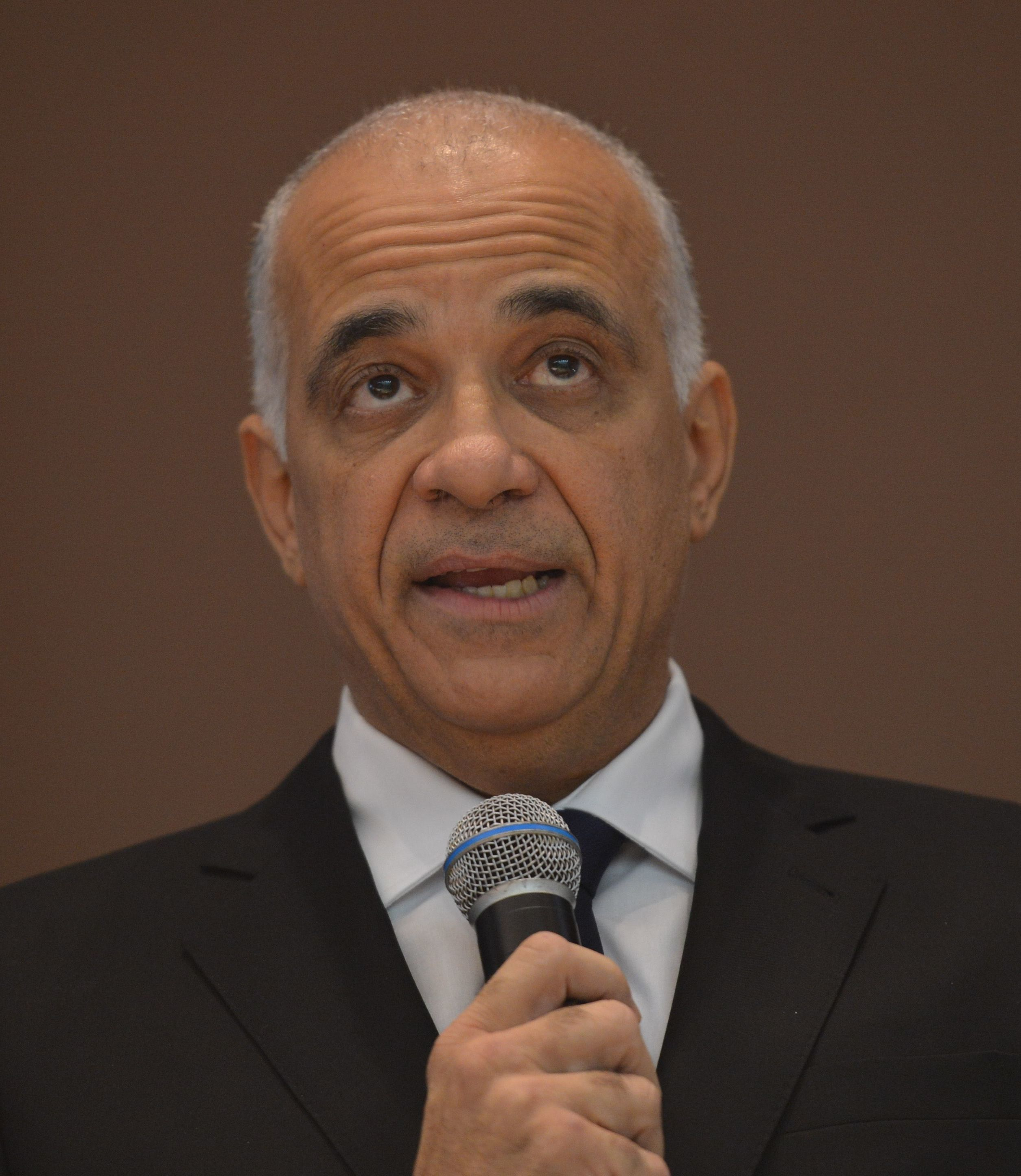
- Jessé de Souza in 2015
- Born: 29 March 1960 (age 66)
- Education: Universidade de Brasília; University of Heidelberg
- Known for: President of Institute of Applied Economic Research
- Scientific career
- Fields: Sociology

Jessé José Freire de Souza or simply Jessé Souza (29 March 1960) is a Brazilian sociologist, professor, and researcher.

On 2 April 2015, Souza was assigned by the Brazilian government as president of the Instituto de Pesquisa Econômica Aplicada (Ipea), replacing Sergei Suarez Dillon Soares. His contract was terminated in May 2016, when Michel Temer took office as acting president, following Dilma Rousseff's impeachment.

== Controversy ==
In February 2026, Souza published a video making claims linking the abuses and crimes committed by Epstein to an alleged "Jewish lobby" and Zionism, even attributing responsibility for the scandal to the State of Israel and the "Jewish power structure," without presenting clear justification or evidence for such connections. The claims were formally repudiated by the Jewish Confederation of Brazil (CONIB). Following these reactions, Souza deleted the original video and released a second clarification video in which he attempted to separate the terms "Jewish" and "Zionist," but maintained statements that continued to be considered offensive by critics and groups that classified part of his discourse as anti-Zionist and anti-Jewish. In parallel, a criminal complaint was registered with the Federal Public Prosecution Office to investigate possible incitement to prejudice and crimes against Jews and Israelis.

== Works ==
- Souza, Jessé. A Elite do Atraso: Da Escravidão à Lava Jato.[The Elite of the Delay: From Slavery to Operation Car Wash] Rio de Janeiro: Leya. 2017. ISBN 978-85-441-0538-2.
- Souza, Jessé. A tolice da inteligência brasileira: ou como o país se deixa manipular pela elite. São Paulo, LeYa, 2015.
- Souza, Jessé/ REHBEIN, Boike. Ungleichheit in kapitalistischen Gesellschaften. Weinheim y Basel: Beltz Juventa, 2014.
- Souza, Jessé. Os batalhadores brasileiros: Nova classe média ou nova classe trabalhadora? Belo Horizonte: UFMG, 2010. (Coleção Humanitas) (2ª edição em 2012)
- Souza, Jessé. A ralé brasileira: quem é e como vive. Belo Horizonte: UFMG, 2009.
- Souza, Jessé. Die Soziale Konstruktion der peripheren Ungleicheit. Wiesbaden: VS Verlag für Sozialwissenschaften, 2008.
- Souza, Jessé (Org.). A Invisibilidade da Desigualdade Brasileira. Belo Horizonte: UFMG, 2006.
- Souza, Jessé (Org.). Imagining Brazil. Lanham: Lexington Books, 2006.
- Kühn, Thomas / Souza, Jessé (Org.) Das moderne Brasilien. Gesellschaft, Politik und Kultur in der Peripherie des Westens. Wiesbaden: VS Verlag für Sozialwissenschaften, 2006.
- Souza, Jessé. A Construção Social da Subcidadania. Belo Horizonte: UFMG, 2006.
- Souza, Jessé. A Modernização Seletiva: Uma Reinterpretação do Dilema Brasileiro. Brasília: UNB, 2000.
