= TJL =

TJL or tjl may refer to:

- TJL Motorsports, a NASCAR Camping World Truck Series team
- TJL, the IATA code for Três Lagoas Airport, Brazil
- tjl, the ISO 639-3 code for Tai Laing language, Burma
