= Marcio Pochmann =

Brazilian economist and politician

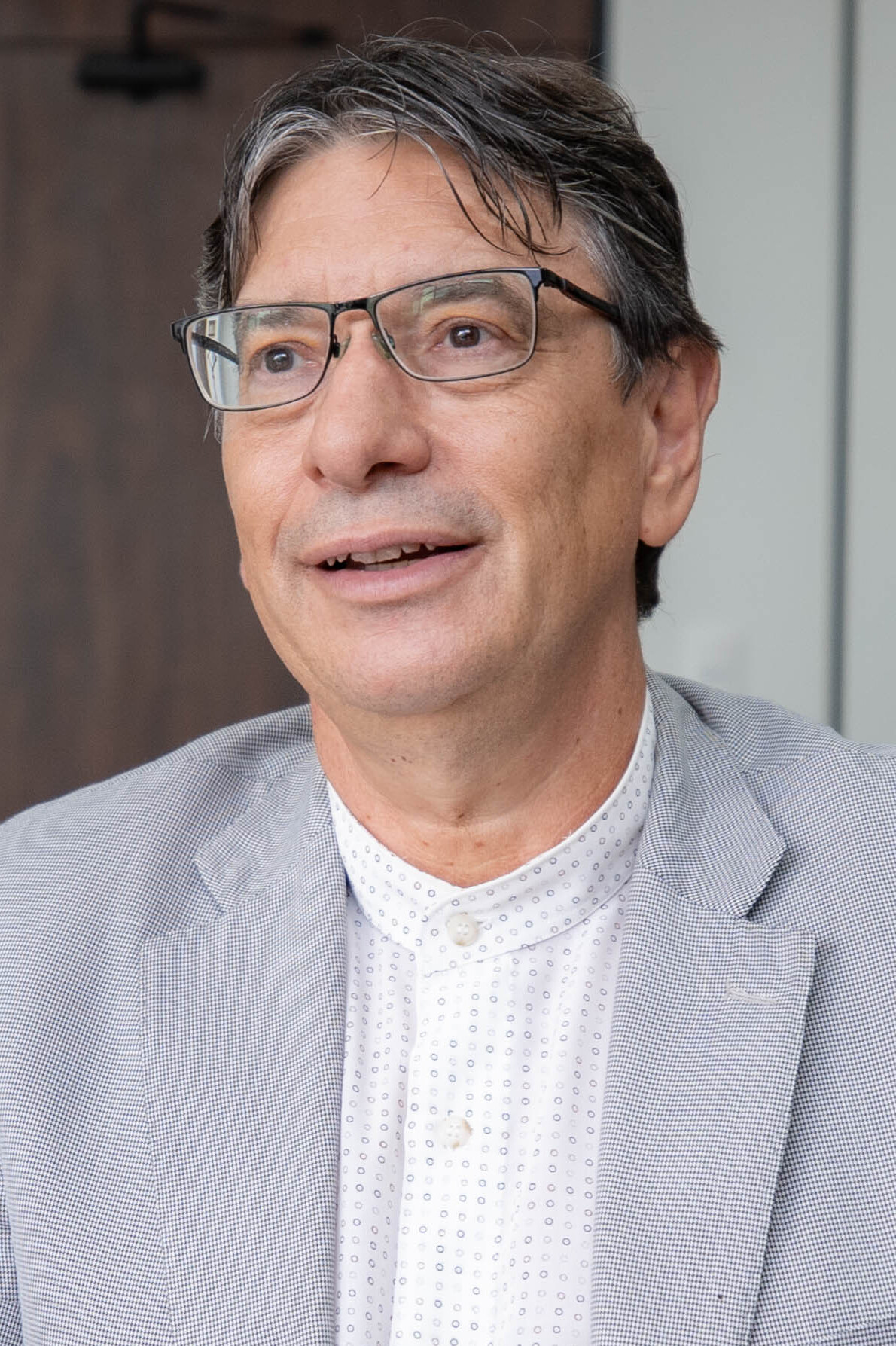
- Pochmann in February 2024

President of the IBGE
- Incumbent
- Assumed office 18 August 2023
- President: Luiz Inácio Lula da Silva
- Minister: Simone Tebet
- Preceded by: Cimar Azeredo Pereira

President of IPEA
- In office 14 August 2007 – 5 June 2012
- President: Luiz Inácio Lula da Silva; Dilma Rousseff
- Minister: Roberto Mangabeira Unger; Samuel Pinheiro Guimarães; Moreira Franco
- Preceded by: Luiz Henrique Proença Soares
- Succeeded by: Marcelo Neri

Secretary of Development, Labor and Solidarity for the City of São Paulo
- In office 2001–2004
- Appointed by: Marta Suplicy

Personal details
- Born: April 19, 1962 (age 64) Venâncio Aires, Rio Grande do Sul, Brazil
- Party: PT

Academic work
- Main interests: Social exclusion Geography of finance
- Education: UFRGS; UNICAMP
- Profession: Economist

Marcio Pochmann (born April 19, 1962) is a Brazilian economist, academic, and politician who has served as President of the Brazilian Institute of Geography and Statistics (IBGE), a research institute of the Ministry of Planning and Budget, since August 2023.

Pochmann, a former professor at the State University of Campinas (UNICAMP), previously served as President of the Institute of Applied Economic Research from 2007 to 2012, during the first presidency of Lula da Silva and the presidency of Dilma Rousseff. He also served as the Secretary of Development, Labor, and Solidarity for the City of São Paulo during the mayorship of Marta Suplicy.

A member of the Workers' Party, Pochmann unsuccessfully ran for Mayor of Campinas in 2012 and 2016, both times losing to Jonas Donizette. Pochmann also ran for Federal Deputy for São Paulo in 2018 but was not elected.

== Life and career ==
Pochmann was born in Venâncio Aires, Rio Grande do Sul, in 1962, to Clyde Pochmann and Lilian Pochmann. He is married to Daisy, with whom he has two children.

=== Education ===
In 1984, he graduated in economics from the Federal University of Rio Grande do Sul (UFRGS). From 1985 to 1988, he studied postgraduate studies in political science at the Central University of the Federal District, in Brasília, Federal District.

In 1993, Pochmann completed a doctorate in Economic Sciences at the State University of Campinas (Unicamp), defending the dissertation entitled Labor and Income Guarantee Policies in Changing Capitalism.

== Public career ==
Pochmann began his public career in 2001.

=== City of São Paulo ===
In 2001, Pochmann was appointed municipal secretary of Development, Labor and Solidarity for the city of São Paulo by mayor Marta Suplicy In this role, he was responsible for managing social inclusion and job creation programs.

=== Institute for Applied Economic Research ===
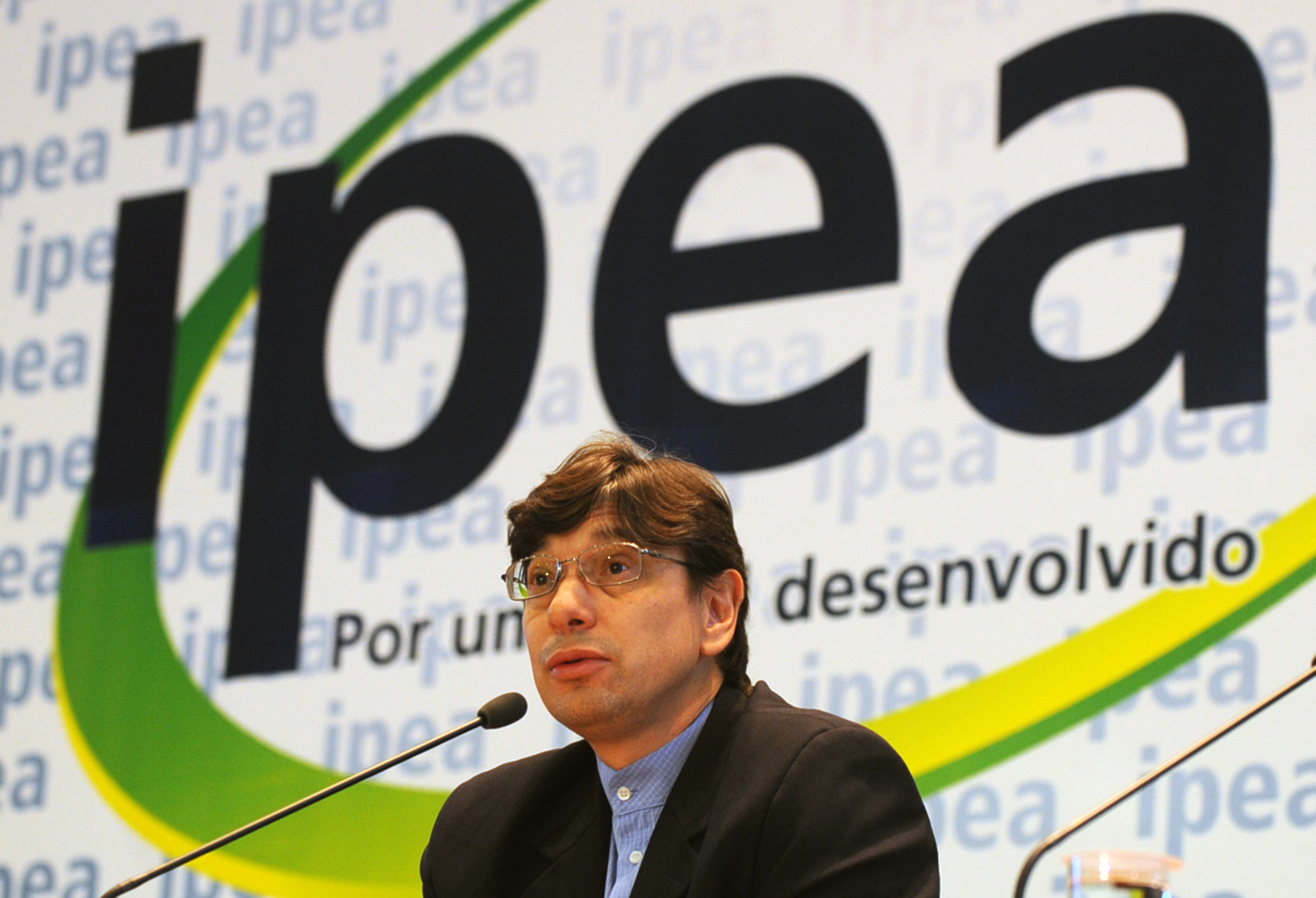
Pochmann as president of IPEA in 2010.

In 2007, Pochmann assumed the presidency of the Institute for Applied Economic Research (Ipea), after receiving an invitation from Minister Mangabeira Unger. At the time, Ipea had 500 workers. Pochmann's selection for the position was considered a strengthening of the developmental wing of President Luiz Inácio Lula da Silva 's government.

Pochmann's management at the institute was heavily questioned due to controversies related to rigging and allegations of political persecution. He was accused of using a research body for political purposes and framing studies to pursue heterodox economics.

Pochmann resigned the position to run for Mayor of Campinas in 2012.

=== Perseu Abramo Foundation ===
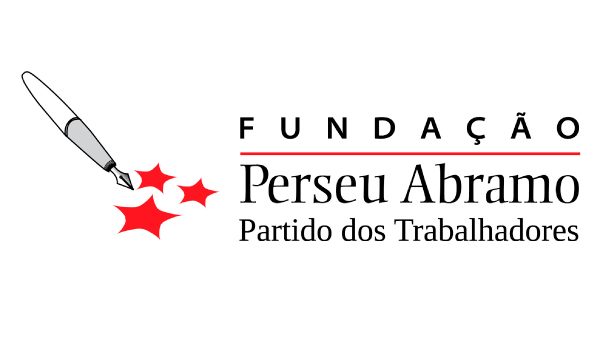
The logo of the Perseu Abramo Foundation, which Pochmann chaired from 2012 to 2020.

In 2012, the National Directory of the Workers' Party appointed Pochmann as president of the Perseu Abramo Foundation, the party's think tank. He served in this position while concurrently running for Mayor of Campinas in 2016 and Federal Deputy in 2018.

Pochmann held the role until 2020 when he was replaced by former senator Aloizio Mercadante.

=== Brazilian Institute of Geography and Statistics ===
In July 2023, he was appointed to preside over the Brazilian Institute of Geography and Statistics (IBGE) by President Luiz Inácio Lula da Silva.

==== Controversy over appointment ====
According to some journalists, the choice of Pochmann caused discomfort among the team at the Ministry of Planning and Budget, who had preferred a technocratic rather than political appointment like that of Luciana Servo at IPEA.

Controversies emerged between Tebet and Lula over the nomination, as Tebet was not consulted. Tebet said in a statement that "Minister Pimenta, not knowing that in the meeting we had with the president we had not mentioned the name, announced it preliminarily. And it has already been placed. The name will be made official at the right time, after the conversation we will have next week with President Lula. We will accept any name that comes."

The Buenos Aires Times reported that Pochmann's leftist economic views are considered "too extreme even by members of Lula's economic team, who worry about damage to IBGE's credibility...after Pochmann's years at IPEA, [which] were controversial and caused several economists who did not agree with him to leave the organisation."

==== Tenure ====
In August 2023, with a ceremony at the ministry's headquarters in Brasília, he assumed the presidency of IBGE.

In November, Pochmann said in a lecture to employees that he intended to change the research dissemination model, not going through press conferences by the mainstream media.

== Elections ==
Year	Election	Party	Office	Coalition	Partner	Party	Votes	%	Result	Ref.
2012	Campinas Mayoral Election	PT	Mayor of Campinas	Campinas with the Force of Brazil PT, PSD, PTC, and PRP	Adriana Flosi	PSD	147,130	28.56%	Second Round	
2012	Campinas Mayoral Election	PT	Mayor of Campinas	Campinas with the Force of Brazil PT, PSD, PTC, and PRP	Adriana Flosi	PSD	231,420	42.31%	Lost	
2016	Campinas Mayoral Election	PT	Mayor of Campinas	None	Vera Lucia	PT	74,334	15.04%	Lost	
2018	São Paulo State Elections	PT	Federal Deputy	None			53,261	0.25%	Lost	

== Publications ==
=== Awards ===
Year	Award	Category	Book	Ref.
2002	Tortoise Prize	Economy, Administration, Business and Law	A Década dos Mitos	
2007	Tortoise Prize	Non-Fiction	Latinoamericana (Note: With 120 contributors.)	
2008	Tortoise Prize	Education and Health	Crescimento Econômico e Distribuição de Renda (Note: Led by Jacques Marcovitch, Hermínia Maricato, Guilherme Ary Plonski, Márcia Faria Westphal and Pochmann contributed among others.)	

=== Works ===
Having published over 50 books, Boitempo Editorial noted these works:

- O emprego na globalização (2001)
- O emprego no desenvolvimento da nação (2008)
- Margem Esquerda n°15 (2010)
- Nova classe média? O trabalho na base da pirâmide social brasileira (2012)
- Margem Esquerda 23: Dossiê: Brasil, que desenvolvimento? (2014)
- O mito da grande classe média (2014)
- Margem Esquerda 29 (2017)
