= Luiz Gonzaga Belluzzo =

Brazilian economist and professor

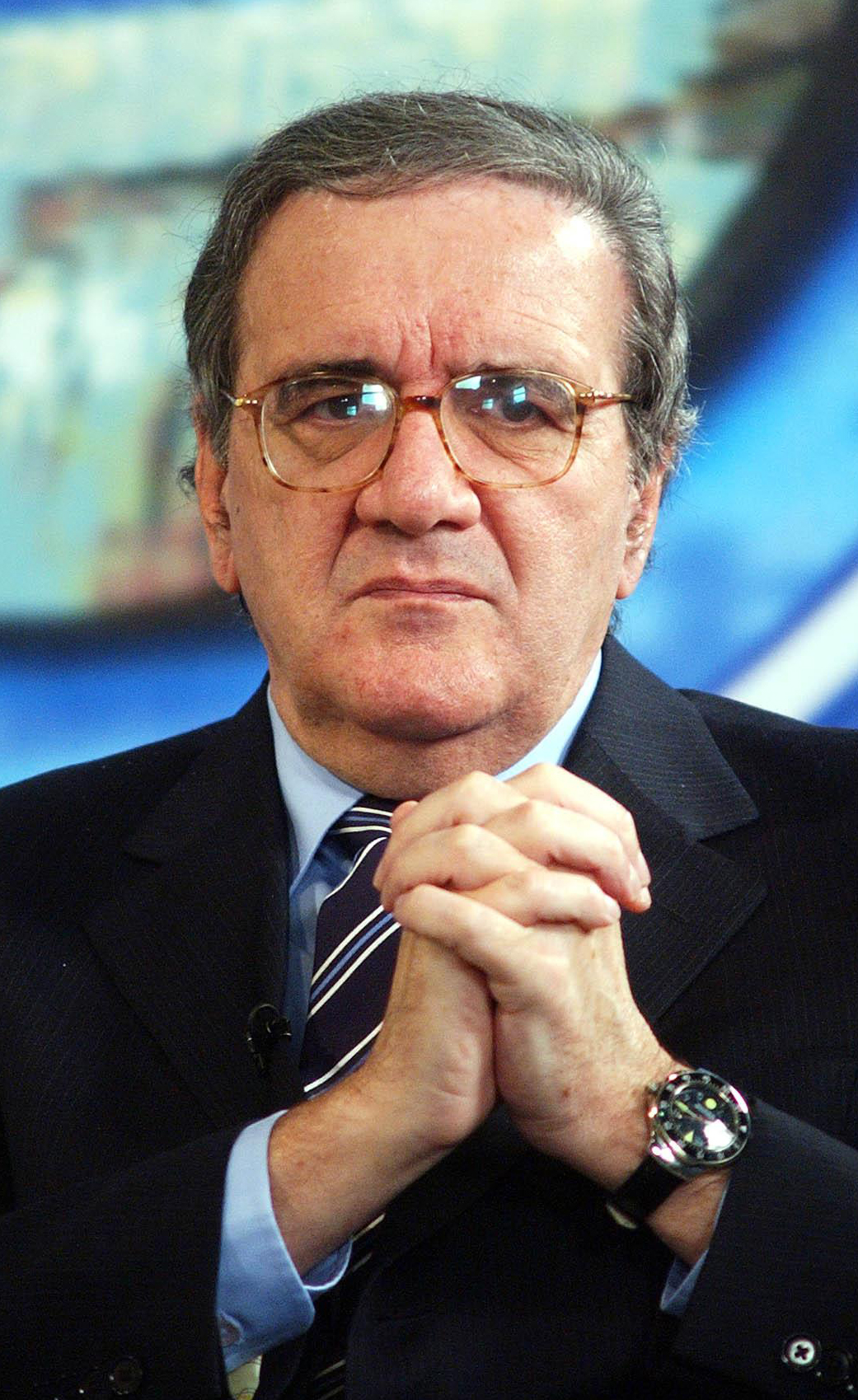
- Luiz Gonzaga Belluzzo in 2007
- Born: October 29, 1942 (age 83); Bariri, São Paulo; Brazil
- Education: University of São Paulo
- Occupations: Economist and professor

Luiz Gonzaga de Mello Belluzzo (Bariri, October 29, 1942), better known as Luiz Gonzaga Belluzzo or just Belluzzo, is a Brazilian economist and professor, and former president of Sociedade Esportiva Palmeiras.

== Biography ==
As a young man, Belluzzo was a seminarian of the Society of Jesus and a student at St. Louis College.

He graduated in Law School at the University of São Paulo in 1965, and also studied Social Sciences at the Faculty of Philosophy, Languages, and Human Sciences at the same university. He entered the post-graduate course in Economic Development, promoted by ECLAC/ILPES, and graduated in 1969. He was a collaborating professor at the State University of Campinas, where he received his doctorate in 1975 and became full professor in 1986.

Belluzzo was economic advisor to the PMDB between 1974 and 1992 and Secretary of Economic Policy at the Ministry of Finance during José Sarney's government, from 1985 to 1987. He was also Secretary of Science and Technology for the State of São Paulo, during the administration of Orestes Quércia, from 1988 to 1990, and later, Secretary of Economy and Planning during the mandate of Luiz Antônio Fleury Filho, from 1991 to 1995. In addition, he was head of the Special Secretary of Economic Affairs of the Ministry of Finance of the Sarney Government.

He founded the Faculty of Campinas (FACAMP) in 1999, along with economists João Manuel Cardoso de Mello, Liana Aureliano, and Eduardo da Rocha Azevedo. FACAMP has professional training courses focused on business and economics based on the Keynesian School of Thought, as well as the Institute of Economics at Unicamp, where he taught for years.

In 2001, he was included in the Biographical Dictionary of Dissenting Economists, and in 2004, he received the Juca Pato Award.

As for the criticism he received, his theoretical influence on the suggestion of savings control as a way to fight inflation in the late 1980s and early 1990s, ideas that were also defended by economists of other theoretical currents, such as Roberto Campos, André Lara Resende, and Mário Henrique Simonsen, is worth mentioning.

Belluzzo was a member of the Board of Directors of Foundation School of Sociology and Politics of São Paulo, full professor of economics at Unicamp, and president of the Deliberative Council of IPSO - Institute of Social and Technological Research and Projects. He was also a member of the Board of Directors of the Commodities and Futures Exchange (BM&F), and an editorial consultant for the weekly magazine CartaCapital. In addition, he was a board member of the São Paulo Research Foundation (FAPESP).

He was also president of the Board of Trustees of the Empresa Brasil de Comunicação (EBC), which operates TV Brasil, a public broadcasting station, was part of the deliberative board of the International Celso Furtado Center for Development Policies, and personal economic advisor to former President Luiz Inácio Lula da Silva.

In November 2014, shortly after President Dilma Rousseff was elected to her second term, Belluzzo, Maria da Conceição Tavares, Ricardo Bielschowsky and Marcio Pochmann headed the Manifesto dos economistas pelo desenvolvimento e pela inclusão social (English: Manifesto of economists for development and social inclusion), countering the view of liberal economists that fiscal and monetary austerity would be the only way forward for Brazil. According to the signatories of the manifesto, the new government should keep real interest rates low (that is, discounting inflation) and adopt a fiscal regime compatible with the resumption of growth. For these analysts, the austerity policy would be useless, both to resume growth and to fight inflation in an economy under threat of prolonged recession. The reinforcement of fiscal and monetary austerity, in this case, would depress household consumption and private investment, leading to a vicious circle of slowing or even falling tax revenues, lower economic growth, and increasing net public debt. This idea is totally opposite to the one defended by the banks in general, which in that context advocated an increase in interest rates and cuts in social spending and public investment, in order to allocate more resources to pay the government debt.

In August 2016 he spoke out against Dilma Rousseff's impeachment process, and the following month he was one of those who stood against PEC 241.

== Confiscation idea ==
According to Carlos Eduardo Carvalho, professor at Unicamp and author of a thesis As Origens e a Gênese do Plano Collor (English: The Origins and Genesis of the Collor Plan) on confiscation, economists Luiz Gonzaga Belluzzo and Júlio Gomes de Almeida wrote a text entitled Crise e reforma monetária no Brasil (English: Crisis and monetary reform in Brazil) whose idea of the "liquidity lock" was present.

== Presidency of Palmeiras ==
On January 26, 2009, he was elected president of Sociedade Esportiva Palmeiras for the 2009/2010 biennium. At the end of 2009, Belluzzo was the articulator of the construction of the new Allianz Parque Arena.

In 2016, Beluzzo had his accounts disapproved and was suspended for 365 days by the Deliberative Council due to irregularities and mismanagement in the command of the team between 2009 and 2010. Elected in 2009 as the person who would change the concept of management in soccer, Luiz Gonzaga Belluzzo left Palmeiras in January 2011 without winning a title and with a balance of accounts payable at least four times higher than when he entered, according to Walter Munhoz, who was once financial vice president of the club.

His management as president of Palmeiras is also criticized by many who blame him for the serious financial difficulties that the team reached at the end of his administration: the debts reached almost 200 million reais without having won any championship.

During his tenure, Jorginho, who had held the lead in the 2009 Campeonato Brasileiro Série A until then, was fired to hire Muricy Ramalho, in order to show to eventual opponents at least one important hiring during his administration. At the end of that championship, Palmeiras didn't even manage to qualify for Libertadores Cup the following year. Still under his management, 80 players were hired for Palmeiras' professional team, most of them coming from São Caetano.

== Publications ==
- Belluzzo, Luiz Gonzaga; Galípolo, Gabriel (2017). Manda Quem Pode, Obedece Quem tem Prejuízo. Contracorrente. ISBN 978-8569220206.
- Belluzzo, Luiz Gonzaga (2016). O Tempo de Keynes nos Tempos do Capitalismo. Contracorrente. ISBN 978-8569220091.
- Belluzzo, Luiz Gonzaga (2013). O capital e suas metamorfoses. Unesp. ISBN 978-8539304028.
- Belluzzo, Luiz Gonzaga (2009). Os antecedentes da tormenta: Origens da crise global. Unesp. ISBN 978-8571399617.
- Belluzzo, Luiz Gonzaga (2004). Ensaios sobre o capitalismo no século XX. Unesp. ISBN 978-8571395442.
- Belluzzo, Luiz Gonzaga; Almeida, Júlio Gomes de (2002). Depois Da Queda. Civilização Brasileira. ISBN 978-8520005880.
- Belluzzo, Luiz Gonzaga (2000). Temporalidade da Riqueza - Teoria da Dinâmica e Financeirização do Capitalismo. UNICAMP.
- Belluzzo, Luiz Gonzaga (1990). "Crise e Reforma Monetária no Brasil" (PDF). São Paulo em Perspectiva. 4 (1): 63–75.
