= Ramez Tebet =

Brazilian lawyer and politician

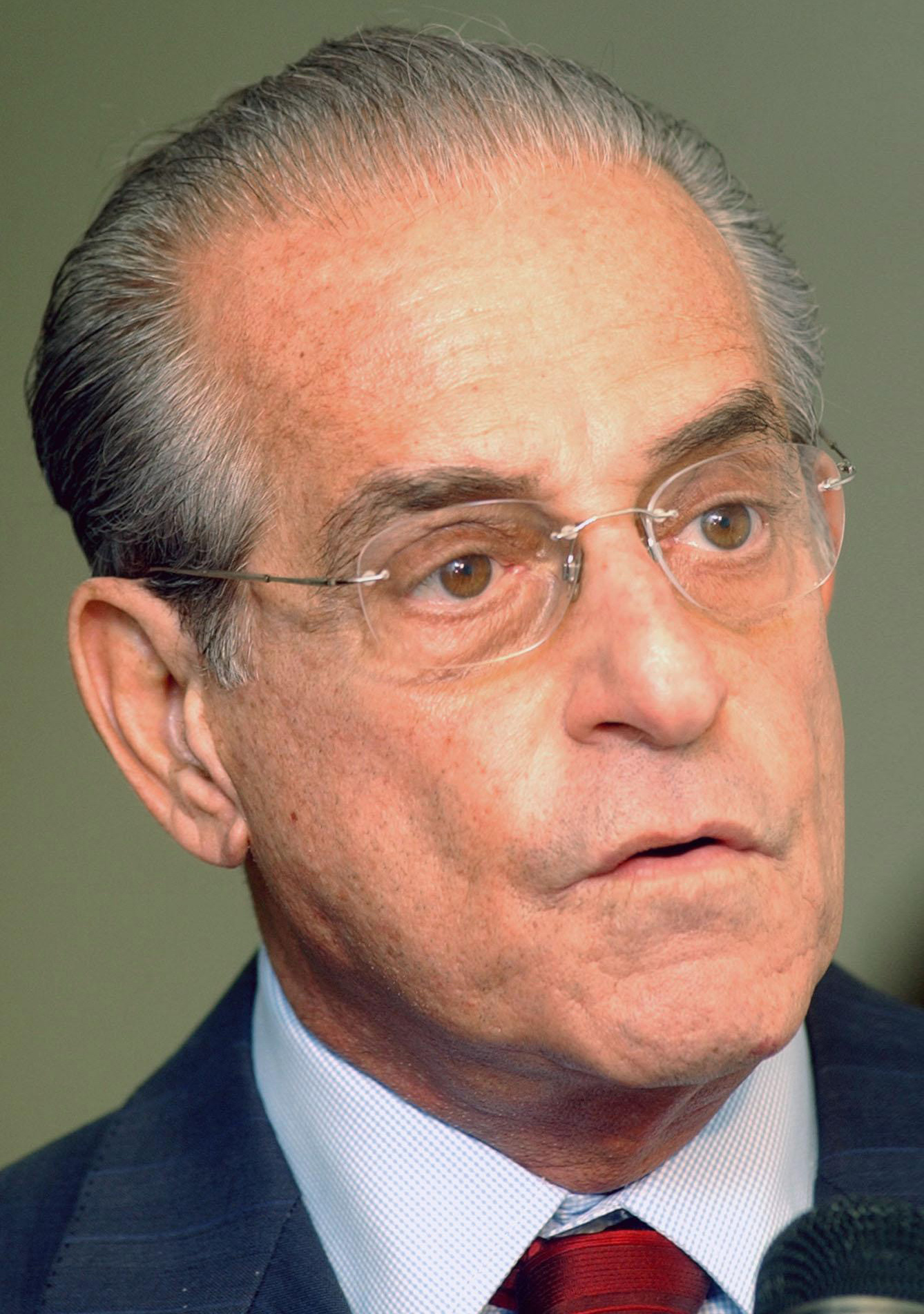
Tebet in 2006

Ramez Tebet (7 November 1936, in Três Lagoas – 17 November 2006, in Campo Grande) was a Brazilian politician and lawyer. He represented Mato Grosso do Sul in the Federal Senate from 1995 to 2006.

The son of Taufic Tebet and Angelina Jaime Tebet, he came from a traditional Arab-Brazilian family. Tebet graduated from the Faculty of Law at UERJ (State University of Rio de Janeiro) in 1959. He was mayor of his hometown, Três Lagoas, in the 1970s. Tebet also served as secretary of Justice, deputy governor and governor of Mato Grosso do Sul.

In the 1990s, he was minister of National Integration under President Fernando Henrique Cardoso (PSDB). From 20 September 2001 to 31 January 2003, Tebet was the President of the Senate. He died on 17 November 2006, after suffering from liver and bladder cancer.

His daughter, Simone Tebet, is currently Minister of Planning, Budget and Management.
