= Leany Lemos =

Brazilian politician (born 1970)

- Lemos in 2026

Member of the Senate
- Incumbent
- Assumed office 6 October 2026
- Preceded by: Leila Barros
- Constituency: Federal District

Personal details
- Born: 6 April 1970 (age 56)
- Party: Brazilian Socialist Party (since 2013)

Leany Barreiro de Sousa Lemos (born 6 April 1970) is a Brazilian politician serving as a member of the Senate since 2026. From 2023 to 2024, she served as national secretary of planning at the Ministry of Planning, Budget and Management.
