= Jane Borges =

Brazilian beauty pageant titleholder

- Born: Jane de Souza Borges Oliveira c. 1985 (age 40–41); Goiânia, Goiás, Brazil
- Other name: Jane Borges
- Height: 1.80 m (5 ft 11 in)
- Beauty pageant titleholder
- Title: Miss Brazil World 2006
- Hair color: Black
- Eye color: Brown
- Major competitions: Miss World 2006 (Top 6) (Miss World Americas); Reina Hispanoamericana 2007 (1st runner-up)

Jane de Souza Borges Oliveira (born c. 1985) is a Brazilian beauty pageant titleholder who represented Brazil in Miss World 2006 in Poland, placing as one of the Top 6 finalists and obtaining the title of Miss World Americas.

== Early life ==
Prior to competing in Miss World 2006, Borges completed an internship at a social security office and intended to pursue a career in psychology.

== Miss World 2006 ==
As the official representative of her country to the 2006 Miss World pageant held in Warsaw, Poland, Borges became one of the Top 25 semifinalists during the Miss World Beach Beauty fast track event, finishing her participation as one of the Top 6 finalists of Miss World 2006 and obtaining the title of Miss World Americas.

== Reina Hispanoamericana 2007 ==
On October 26, 2007, she participated in Reina Hispanoamericana 2007 and placed first runner-up to Massiel Taveras of the Dominican Republic.

Awards and achievements
Preceded by (Mexico) Dafne Molina	Miss World Americas; 2006	Succeeded by (Mexico) Carolina Morán
Preceded by Patrícia Reginato	Miss Brazil World; 2006	Succeeded by Regiane Andrade
