= Três Lagoas Airport =

Plínio Alarcom Airport Aeroporto Plínio Alarcom
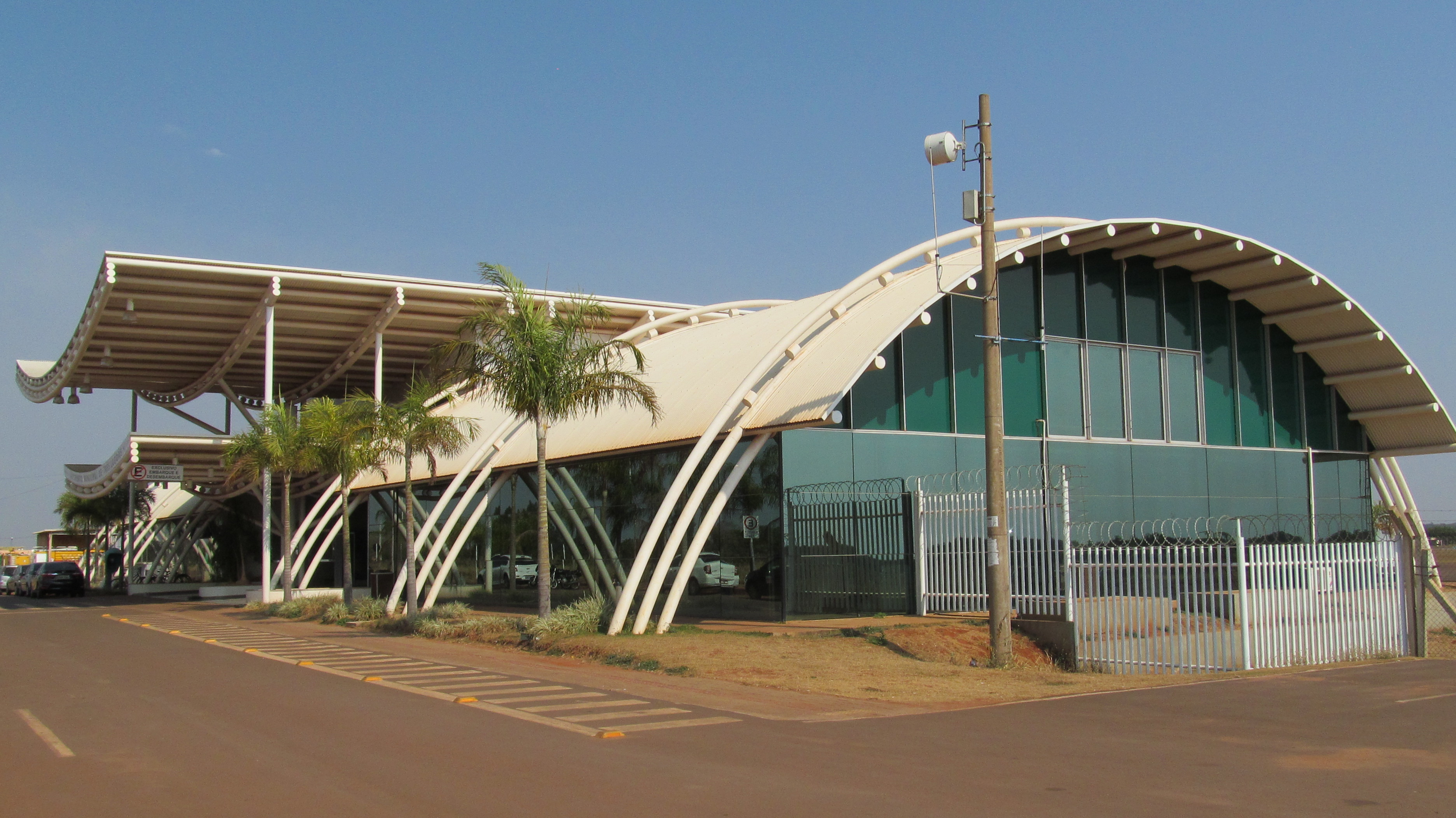
- IATA: TJL; ICAO: SBTG; LID: MS0006

Summary
- Airport type: Public
- Serves: Três Lagoas
- Time zone: BRT−1 (UTC−04:00)
- Elevation AMSL: 323 m (1,060 ft)
- Coordinates: 20°45′05″S 051°40′49″W

Map
- Location in Brazil

Runways
Direction	Length		Surface
Direction	m	ft	Surface
07/25	2,000	6,562	Asphalt
- Sources: ANAC, DECEA

Plínio Alarcom Airport (IATA: TJL, ICAO: SBTG) is the airport serving Três Lagoas, Brazil.

== Access ==
The airport is located 5 km (3 mi) from downtown Três Lagoas.

== See also ==
- List of airports in Brazil
