= Rogério Carvalho =

Brazilian footballer

Personal information
- Full name: Rogério Carvalho
- Date of birth: 28 May 1980 (age 46)
- Place of birth: Brazil
- Height: 6 ft 4 in (1.93 m)
- Position: Striker

Senior career*
Years	Team	Apps	(Gls)
?–2002	Ituano	?	(?)
2002–2003	York City	4	(0)
2002–2003	→ Harrogate Town (loan)	3	(0)
- * Club domestic league appearances and goals

Rogério Carvalho (born 28 May 1980) is a Brazilian former footballer who played as a striker.

== Career ==
Carvalho joined English Third Division York City from Ituano in August 2002 after impressing during pre-season, becoming the first Brazilian player to play for the club. He spent a month on loan at Northern Premier League side Harrogate Town and was released by York in January 2003.
