= Mariana Bridi Costa =

Brazilian model (1988–2009)

- Born: 18 June 1988; Marechal Floriano, Espírito Santo, Brazil
- Died: 24 January 2009 (aged 20); Espírito Santo, Brazil
- Cause of death: Sepsis, urinary infection and abdominal bleeding
- Other names: Mari, Mariana Bridi da Costa
- Modeling information
- Height: 1.75 m (5 ft 9 in)
- Hair color: Brown
- Eye color: Brown

Mariana Bridi Costa (June 18, 1988 – January 24, 2009), also known as Mari, was a Brazilian model.

== Biography ==
She began her career at the age of 14 and participated in competitions and fashion events. In 2006 she secured the fourth place in the Miss World Brazil 2006 beauty pageant. In 2007, she participated in the Miss Bikini International contest.

In the same year she participated in the Face Of The Universe held in South Africa and won the title for the fourth most beautiful face in the world. She was also a finalist in the Brazilian stage of the Miss World 2008 beauty pageant and won fourth place.

Bridi became ill in December 2008, initially suspected of having kidney stones. By early January, she was diagnosed with a urinary tract infection that worsened to become septic shock caused by a bacterial infection, probably Pseudomonas aeruginosa, a difficult pathogen to treat because of its resistance to many antibiotics. Pseudomonas aeruginosa is an unusual agent to cause a urinary tract infection which appeared to have caused the sepsis.

Later in January, her sepsis worsened, causing tissue necrosis in her feet and hands, which were then amputated in an attempt to save her life. A part of her stomach was later removed during her final surgery.

=== Death ===
She died on the morning of January 24, 2009, in a hospital in Espírito Santo as a result of complications from necrotic sepsis resulting from the original infection. The cause of death according to the hospital certificate was a severe sepsis, urinary infection and abdominal bleeding which led to the failure of multiple organs.

The case attracted attention around the world, and friends said they had received messages of support from all around the world. Her funeral was followed by more than 1,000 people.
