= Brazilian Institute of Geography and Statistics =

Government agency

Coordinates: 22°54′34″S 43°10′14″W

- Instituto Brasileiro de Geografia e Estatística

Agency overview
- Formed: 29 May 1936; 90 years ago
- Headquarters: Rio de Janeiro, Brazil
- Employees: 11,850
- Annual budget: ▼ R$ 2.45 billion (2022)
- Agency executive: Marcio Pochmann, President
- Parent agency: Ministry of the Economy
- Website: ibge.gov.br

Footnotes
- The Demographic Census 2022 budget is R$ 2.29 billion

The Brazilian Institute of Geography and Statistics (Portuguese: Instituto Brasileiro de Geografia e Estatística; IBGE) is a government body responsible for collecting, processing, compiling and publishing statistics and geographic information of the Brazilian physical and socioeconomic landscapes and the country's demographics. The IBGE operates the national census decennially, whereby the population is surveyed for data such as household income, level of education, employment status and occupation, access to public services and infrastructure, and general demographics.

The IBGE is a public institute created in 1936 under the name National Institute of Statistics. Its founder and chief proponent was statistician Mário Augusto Teixeira de Freitas. The current name dates from 1938. Its headquarters are located in Rio de Janeiro, and its current president is Marcio Pochmann, replacing Eduardo Rios Neto. It was made a federal agency by the Federal Decree-Law No. 161 of February 13, 1967, and is linked to the Ministry of the Economy, inside the Secretariat of Planning, Budget and Management.

== Structure ==
The IBGE has a network of national research and dissemination components, comprising:

- 27 state units (26 in state capitals and one in the Federal District);
- 27 centres for documentation and dissemination of information (26 in the capital and one in the Federal District);
- 27 units for the supervision of territorial mapping (26 in the capital and one in the Federal District);
- 585 data collection agencies in major cities.
- Headquarters in Rio de Janeiro (the capital of the Republic when the Office was established).

Also in Rio are five boards and a school: Executive Directors (ED), Directorate of Research (DPE), Department of Geosciences (DGC), Department of Informatics (DI), Center for Documentation and Information Dissemination (CDDI) and the National School of Statistical Sciences, a degree-granting institution.

The Directorate of Research is responsible for planning and coordinating the research of nature and processing of statistical data collected by the state units; the Department of Geosciences is responsible for basic cartography, the national geodetic system, with a survey of natural resources and environment and by survey and geographical studies.

The Center for Documentation and Information Dissemination is responsible for documentation and dissemination of information produced by the institute as well as coordinating the 27 CDDIs in the country, and the National School of Statistical Sciences, besides being responsible for training the institute's employees, is a federal institution of higher learning that offers the following courses: BA in statistics; specialization in Environmental Analysis and Management Planning, and Masters in Population Studies and Social Research.

The IBGE also maintains the Roncador Ecological Reserve, situated 35 km south of Brasília.

== System of national accounts ==
Gives an overview of the economy and describes the phenomena of economic life: production, consumption and wealth accumulation, providing a comprehensive and simplified representation of these data. The System of National Accounts IBGE follows the most recent UN recommendations expressed in the Handbook of National Accounts (System of National Accounts 1993, SNA), including the calculation of Gross Domestic Product (GDP) and the Input-output matrix.

=== Quarterly national accounts ===
Displays the current value and volume indices (1991 = 100) every quarter for the Gross Domestic Product at market prices, taxes on products, value added at basic prices, personal consumption, government consumption, Gross fixed capital formation, changes in inventories, exports and imports of goods and services. Two series of index numbers are calculated: the basis of the previous year and chained with reference to 1990 (1990 = 100). The series is seasonally adjusted using X-12-ARIMA, enabling calculation of the rates of change over the previous quarter.

The IBGE survey was started in 1988 and restructured after 1998, when their results were integrated into the current System of National Accounts. The annual weights are derived from this new system accounts.

== Archives ==
The IBGE maintains the following archives (non-exhaustive list):

- Municipal Agricultural Production (MAP)
- Municipal Livestock Survey (PPM)
- Extraction Plant and Forestry Research (PEVS)
- Annual Survey of Industry (full model) (PIA-C)
- Annual Survey of Industries (simplified form) (PIA-S)
- Annual Survey of Industries (product) (PIA-Prod)
- Annual Survey of Construction Industry (Paice)
- Annual Survey of Trade (simplified model) (PAC-S)
- Annual Survey of Trade (full model) (PAC-C)
- Annual Services Survey (PAS)
- Continuous National Sample Survey of Households (PNADC)
- Monthly Survey of Employment and Wages (PIMES)
- Monthly Industrial Survey of Physical Production (PIM -PF)
- Monthly Survey of Trade (PMC)
- Monthly Survey of Services (PMS)
- Household Budget Survey (POF)

== Requirement and confidentiality of information ==
The legislation, according to the Federal Decree No. 73,177 of November 20, 1973 and the Law No. 5534 of November 14, 1968, modified by the Federal Law No. 5878 of May 11, 1978, deals with the obligation and confidentiality of information collected by the IBGE, which is intended exclusively for statistical purposes and has no legal value, not being usable as evidence or proof.

Failure to provide information within the specified deadlines, or providing false information is a crime subject to a fine, initially, of up to 10 times the highest minimum wage in the country, and up to twice this limit on later occasions.

== Some economic indicators released by the IBGE ==
- National System of Consumer Price Indices

- National Index of Consumer Prices (INPC)
- Broad National Consumer Price Index (IPCA)
- National Index of Construction (INCC)

== Censuses ==
=== Population census ===
The best known census is the population census (Brazilian Portuguese: censo demográfico). First conducted in its modern form in 1872, it is now conducted every ten years, usually in years ending in zero. No census took place in 1880, 1910 or 1930.

The census is conducted solely by the IBGE, as enshrined in law. Comprehensive demographic data is collected on the population (including age, income, sex, etc.), as well as housing stock. Unlike approaches taken in other countries (e.g., the United States), the questionnaire asks respondents to self-identify by skin color, phrasing the question as "Color or Race".

The most recent census was conducted in 2022; it was originally intended to be conducted in 2020, but it was delayed due to the COVID-19 pandemic.

==== Populational counts ====
A simpler populational count (contagem de população) is theoretically made in the interval between two censuses, starting in 1996. These aim to update the data on the number of inhabitants, of great importance to Brazil's cities, because annual grants from the Municipalities Participation Fund are determined mainly by population. The IBGE is responsible for estimating populations annually for every municipality in the country, and these populational counts enhance the quality of estimates.

The first populational count was conducted in 1996, not only to update population data, but also to get municipality level data after the emergence and redefinition of new municipalities after the census of 1991. The most recent count was done in 2007, delayed from 2005 because of budgetary concerns, and the 2016 count was completely cancelled for similar reasons.

=== Agricultural census ===
The agricultural census collects information on agricultural establishments, forests and/or aquaculture of all municipalities of the country. The goal of this research is to update previous census data and to provide information about economic, social, and environmental farming. Since 1996, the census has occurred roughly every 10 years.

The 1996 agricultural census was conducted by the IBGE from August 1995 to July 1996, in reference to Brazil's crop harvests. The following agricultural census was undertaken in 2007, and surveyed agricultural activity for the 2006 calendar year. The 2017 agricultural census returned to a survey period based on crop harvests, and was conducted from October 2016 to September 2017, with results released in 2018.

== See also ==
- List of national mapping agencies
- Instituto Nacional de Estatística
