= Mara Gabrilli =

Brazilian psychologist and politician

Senator for São Paulo
- Incumbent
- Assumed office 1 February 2019

Member of the Chamber of Deputies
- In office 1 February 2011 – 1 February 2019
- Constituency: São Paulo

Member of the Municipal Chamber of São Paulo
- In office 1 January 2009 – 1 February 2011
- Constituency: At-large

Personal details
- Born: Mara Cristina Gabrilli; 28 September 1967 (age 59) São Paulo, Brazil
- Party: PSD (2023–present)
- Other political affiliations: PSDB (2004–23)
- Education: Universidade Paulista (BAPsy); Escola Superior de Propaganda e Marketing (BSM)
- Profession: Psychologist, marketer, politician

Mara Cristina Gabrilli (born 28 September 1967) is a Brazilian psychologist, advertiser and politician affiliated with the Social Democratic Party. She was elected as a federal deputy representing the state of São Paulo in the 2010 election, being reelected four years later.

After becoming quadriplegic in 1994 due to a car crash, Gabrilli became an activist for people with disabilities, founding the Instituto Mara Gabrilli in 1997, advocating for their rights. Before being elected for the Brazilian Congress, Gabrilli was vereadora (councilwoman) for the city of São Paulo and the Municipal Secretary for People with disabilities.

In 2018, Gabrilli was elected to the Brazilian Senate.

In 2023, she left the Brazilian Social Democracy Party (PSDB) due to personal disagreements with recent party decisions and decided to join the Social Democratic Party (PSD).
