= Institute of Applied Economic Research =

Brazilian government-led research organization

Coordinates: 15.8016°S 47.8961°W

The Institute for Applied Economic Research (Portuguese: Instituto de Pesquisa Econômica Aplicada, Ipea) is a Brazilian government-led research organization dedicated to generating macroeconomical, sectorial and thematic studies in order to base government planning and policy-making. It equally supports the federal government in the formulation and evaluation of public policy. The institute is headquartered in Brasília and has a regional office in Rio de Janeiro.

Ipea is a public foundation created in 1964 and linked to the Ministry of Planning and Budget. Its first director was João Paulo dos Reis Veloso, who later became Minister of Planning. It is currently presided by Dr. Luciana Servo.

In 2019, it was considered the best government think tank in Latin America by the Global Go To Think Tank Index Report. In addition, the same survey lists the institution as one of the 25 best government think tanks in the world.

== Research departments ==
There are currently six research departments at Ipea:

- Department of Studies and Sectoral Policies, Innovation, Regulation and Infrastructure (Diset);
- Department of Regional, Urban and Environmental Studies and Policies (Dirur);
- Department of Social Studies and Policies (Disoc);
- Department of Macroeconomic Studies and Policies (Dimac);
- Department of International Studies (Dinte);
- Department of Studies and Policies of the State, Institutions and Democracy (Diest).
