= Três Lagoas =

- Municipality
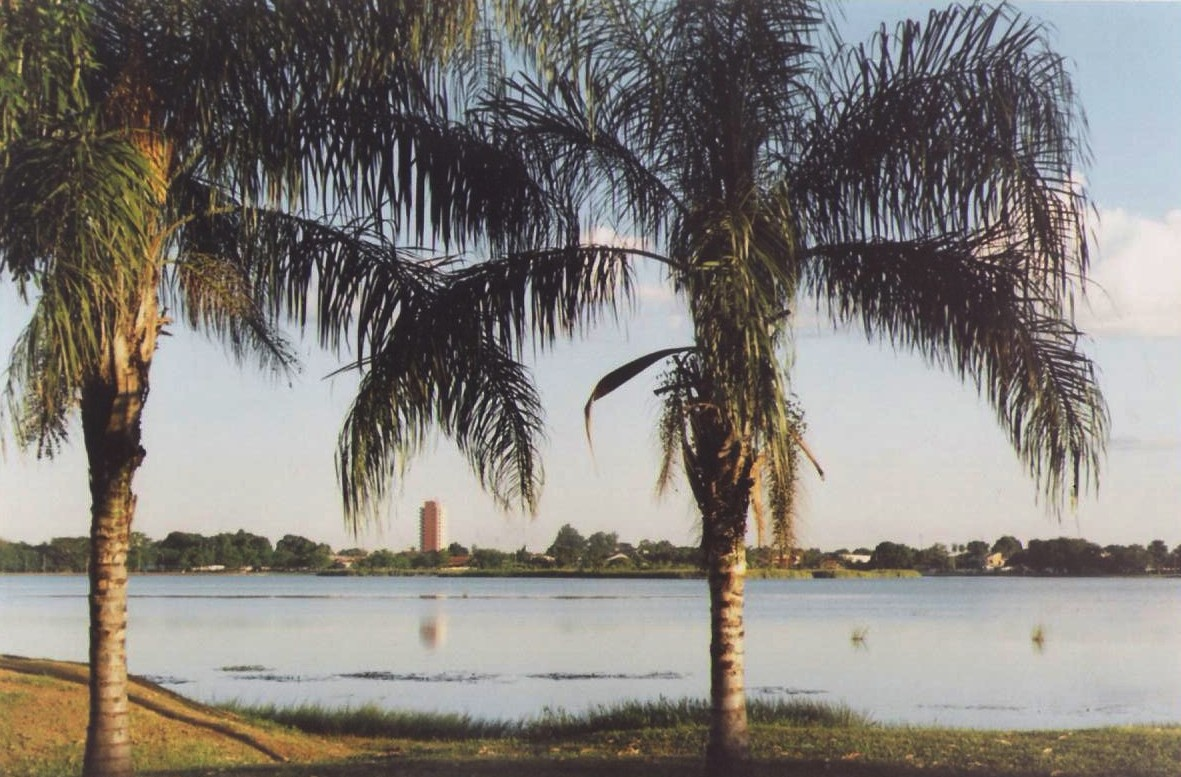
- Lagoa Maior near the center of Três Lagoas

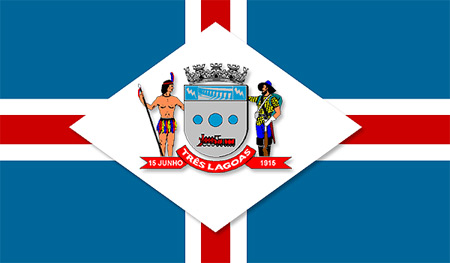
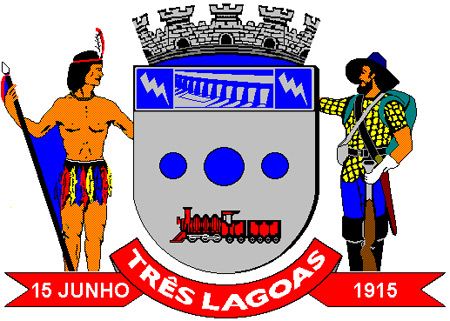
- Flag Coat of arms

- Três Lagoas in Mato Grosso do Sul

- Location in Brazil
- Coordinates: 20°45′04″S 51°40′42″W
- Country: Brazil
- Region: Central-West
- State: Mato Grosso do Sul
- Mesoregion: East of Mato Grosso do Sul
- Established: 1915

Government
  - Mayor: Dr. Cassiano Maia

Area
  - Total: 3,940.701 sq mi (10,206.370 km^{2})

Population (2026)
  - Total: 145,514
- Time zone: UTC−4 (AMT)

Três Lagoas ("Three Ponds") is a municipality in Mato Grosso do Sul, Brazil. It is the third most populous city in that state. Founded in 1915, colonization began in 1880 by Luís Correia Neves Filho, Antônio Trajano dos Santos e Protásio Garcia Leal. It is named for three lakes in the region.

The city itself has a population of 145,514 . The city has a reasonable income distribution and does not have pockets of poverty.

Culturally different, very close to southern cultures, such as Gaucho and Catarinense. Large festivals are held here as well as rodeos.

The city is served by Plínio Alarcom Airport.

== Demographics ==
Demographic evolution
1940	15.378
1950	18.803
1960	31.690
1970	55.513
1980	57.904
1991	68.162
1996	74.797
2000	78.900
2004	84.650
2005	85.886
2006	87.113
2009	89.493
2010	101.722
2012	105.224
2014	111.652
2015	113.619
2020	123.281
2025	143.523

== Notable people ==
- José Luíz Barbosa — brazilian former middle distance runner

== Climate ==
Climate data for Três Lagoas (1981–2010)
Month	Jan	Feb	Mar	Apr	May	Jun	Jul	Aug	Sep	Oct	Nov	Dec	Year
Mean daily maximum °C (°F)	32.9 (91.2)	32.8 (91.0)	32.8 (91.0)	31.8 (89.2)	28.6 (83.5)	27.8 (82.0)	28.3 (82.9)	31.0 (87.8)	31.1 (88.0)	33.0 (91.4)	32.6 (90.7)	32.6 (90.7)	31.3 (88.3)
Daily mean °C (°F)	27.0 (80.6)	26.8 (80.2)	26.5 (79.7)	25.0 (77.0)	21.7 (71.1)	20.3 (68.5)	20.9 (69.6)	22.6 (72.7)	23.9 (75.0)	26.0 (78.8)	26.5 (79.7)	26.6 (79.9)	24.5 (76.1)
Mean daily minimum °C (°F)	22.5 (72.5)	22.4 (72.3)	21.8 (71.2)	19.5 (67.1)	16.5 (61.7)	14.7 (58.5)	14.4 (57.9)	16.2 (61.2)	18.1 (64.6)	20.4 (68.7)	21.4 (70.5)	22.0 (71.6)	19.2 (66.6)
Average precipitation mm (inches)	241.3 (9.50)	167.1 (6.58)	147.1 (5.79)	78.4 (3.09)	65.7 (2.59)	34.6 (1.36)	17.7 (0.70)	28.5 (1.12)	64.3 (2.53)	111.4 (4.39)	147.0 (5.79)	191.3 (7.53)	1,294.4 (50.96)
Average precipitation days (≥ 1.0 mm)	15	11	9	5	5	3	2	2	6	8	9	12	87
Mean monthly sunshine hours	186.3	196.4	210.2	219.4	215.8	191.0	224.6	224.8	184.7	204.5	211.5	201.2	2,470.4
Source: Instituto Nacional de Meteorologia

== See also ==
- Roman Catholic Diocese of Três Lagoas
- José Luíz Barbosa
