= Pauderney Avelino =

Brazilian civil engineer and politician

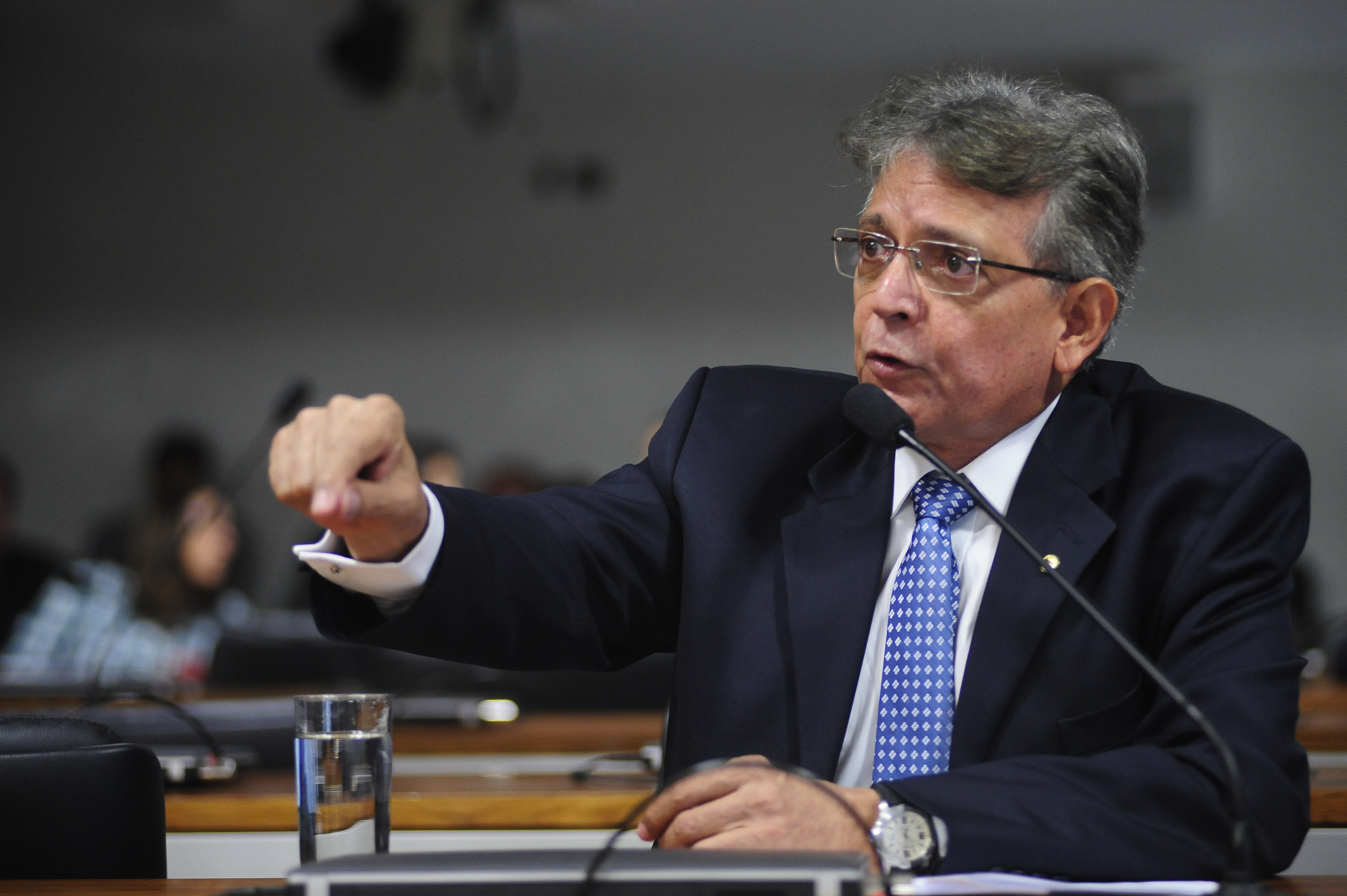
- Avelino in 2019

Federal Deputy from Amazonas
- In office 1 February 1991 – 31 January 2007; 1 February 2011 – 31 January 2019; 22 January 2024 – 4 November 2024

Secretary of Education of Manaus
- In office 4 January 2013 – 18 December 2013
- In office 1 January 2021 – 29 March 2022

Personal details
- Born: Pauderney Avelino; September 24, 1954 (age 72) Eirunepé, Amazonas, Brazil
- Party: PDC (1990–1993); PPR (1993–1995); PPB (1995–1997); PFL (1997–2007); DEM (2007–2022); UNIÃO (2022–present)
- Spouse: Andrea Bartonelli
- Profession: Civil engineer Entrepreneur; Politician

Pauderney Tomaz Avelino (September 24, 1954) is a Brazilian civil engineer, businessman, and politician, affiliated with the Brazil Union (UNIÃO).

He was a federal deputy between 1991 and 2007 and returned to office after being elected in 2010, returning to the Chamber of Deputies in Brasília where he remained from 2011 until 2019. In January 2024, he returned to the Chamber of Deputies, after having been Fausto Junior's deputy, who gave up his seat to take on the Manaus State Secretariat for Sanitation, Housing and Urban Development (Sedurb). He remained a deputy until November 2024, when Júnior returned to his post in Brasília. He was also Manaus' municipal secretary of education.

== Biography ==
=== Early years and education ===
Born in Eirunepé, a town in the southwest of Amazonas, Pauderney moved to Manaus, the state capital, when he was still young. He graduated in civil engineering in 1979 and even started law school, but didn't finish, both at the former University of Amazonas, now the Federal University of Amazonas (UFAM).

=== Career ===
He taught at the former Federal Technical School of Amazonas, now the Federal Institute of Amazonas (IFAM), from 1974 to 1978. He was also one of the founding partners of Construtora Capital, a company he still runs today.

== Political ==
Affiliated to the Christian Democratic Party (PDC), he was elected federal deputy for Amazonas in 1990, after receiving 15 659 votes.

In 1993, the PDC merged with the Social Democratic Party (PDS) to form the Progressive Renewal Party (PPR), which Pauderney joined. With the new party, he was re-elected to the federal parliament after receiving 35 013 votes.

In 1997 he was decorated by the Italian government with the Cavalieri di Gran Croce commendation. That same year, he joined his third party, this time the Liberal Front Party (PFL), with a view to running for state senator, after Governor Amazonino Mendes joined the party. Despite his efforts to run for the Senate, he ran for federal deputy for the party for the third time. In 1998, he was once again successful and was elected after receiving 59 027 votes. In 2002, he was one of the main organisers of José Serra's campaign for president in the 2002 election, in which Serra was defeated by Luiz Inácio Lula da Silva. Despite his defeat at national level, Pauderney was re-elected as a federal deputy with 75 029 votes.

After four terms as a federal deputy, in 2006 he announced his candidacy for the Senate. He received 289 234 votes and came second in the election, beaten by Alfredo Nascimento. In 2007, the Liberal Front Party changed its name to Democrats (DEM) and Pauderney remained in the party. He ran his fifth campaign for federal deputy for Amazonas, this time for the DEM, and was elected after receiving 100 199 votes.

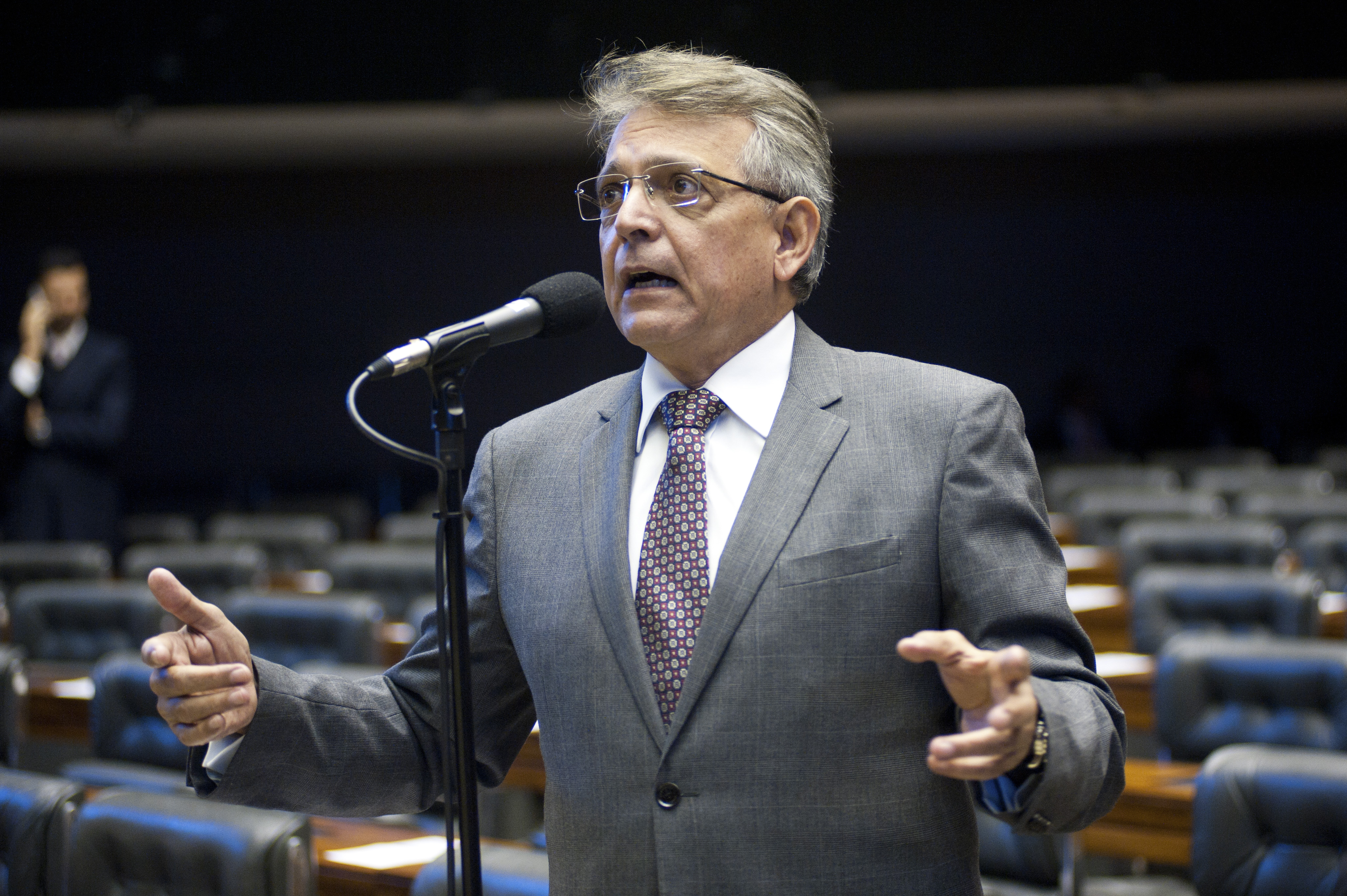
Pauderney Avelino in the Chamber of Deputies in 2015.

In 2012, he ran for executive office for the first time, as the DEM candidate for mayor of Manaus. After receiving 26,371 votes, Pauderney finished in sixth place and did not advance to the second round, which was contested between communist Vanessa Grazziotin and the candidate of the Brazilian Social Democracy Party, Arthur Neto.

In 2014, he ran for the federal deputy of Amazonas for the sixth time and was elected after receiving 102 488 votes. In 2016, he voted in favor of Dilma Rouseff's impeachment. He was harassed and assaulted in the early afternoon of May 13, 2016, when he arrived from Brasilia at Eduardo Gomes International Airport in Manaus. ccording to him, the acts were carried out by a group of people linked to the Workers' Party (PT) and Communist Party of Brazil (PCdoB). According to the parliamentarian, the group, made up of 15 people, harassed him in the airport lobby, calling him a "coup plotter" because of his position in Congress in favor of opening the impeachment process against President Dilma Rousseff. "I got on the plane and saw that there were some people, some indigenous people, boarding with me, all paid for by Dilma with public money. I think they told the others here in Manaus that I was on the plane. When I was in the lobby, they started chasing me, shouting that they were against my vote for impeachment, calling me a coup plotter. One guy even threw a poster at me and I reacted. When I reacted, the people at the airport started applauding me and shouting my name. Officials had to escortme to my car". Pauderney said that eight of the people who attacked him came with him on the plane from Brasilia, and he believes that another seven or eight joined the group at the airport. He also said that he would request the images from the security system from the Federal Police, in order to file a complaint against the alleged attackers.

In Michel Temer's government, he was DEM leader. He was in favor of the labor reform and voted to dismiss the complaint against Michel Temer filed by the Public Prosecutor's Office.

In the following election, in 2018, he remained as an alternate, unable to emerge directly after the votes. In the same year, he signaled his support for far-right candidate Jair Bolsonaro in the 2018 presidential election. He took part in Bolsonaro's transition government and was chosen to organize measures for a pension reform.

After the merger of the DEM with the Social Liberal Party (PSL), which gave rise to Brazil Union (UNIÃO), Pauderney joined the newly formed party. In the 2022 election, he ran again for federal deputy. He became a substitute after receiving 52,014 votes. In January 2024, he returned to the Chamber of Deputies, after having been Fausto Junior's deputy, who gave up his seat to take on the Manaus State Secretariat for Sanitation, Housing and Urban Development (Sedurb). He remained a deputy until November 2024, when Júnior returned to his post in Brasília.

=== Electoral performance ===
Electoral performance of Pauderney Avelino
Year	Election	Office	Party	Votes	Result	Ref.
1990	Amazonas gubernatorial election	Federal deputy	Christian Democratic Party	15 659	Elected	
1994	Amazonas gubernatorial election	Federal deputy	Progressive Renewal Party	35 013	Elected	
1998	Amazonas gubernatorial election	Federal deputy	Liberal Front Party	59 027	Elected	
2002	Amazonas gubernatorial election	Federal deputy	Liberal Front Party	75 029	Elected	
2006	Amazonas gubernatorial election	Senator	Liberal Front Party	289 234	Not elected	
2010	Amazonas gubernatorial election	Federal deputy	Democrats	100 199	Elected	
2012	Manaus mayoral election	Mayor	Democrats	26 371	Not elected	
2014	Amazonas gubernatorial election	Federal deputy	Democrats	102 488	Elected	
2018	Amazonas gubernatorial election	Federal deputy	Democrats	72 358	Substitute	
2022	Amazonas gubernatorial election	Federal deputy	Brazil Union	52 014	Substitute	

== Controversies ==
=== Overbilling ===
On August 16, 2013, the Deputy Secretary of Education of Manaus, Deuzamir Pereira, stated in an interview with the newspaper A Crítica that there was a group "embezzling public funds" through the rental of buildings used as schools in the municipality. According to the deputy secretary, the city spent 29 million reais on property rentals for school operations. He stated: "This (rental) is a dirty business (...). It contaminates part of the fabric. We need to remove this cancer." He also mentioned that some of the rented properties were in deplorable conditions. A few days later, he was summoned to the Manaus City Council to explain his statements and denied having made the allegations reported by the newspaper. Deuzamir claimed he had only referred to the rentals as a "cancer" not suggesting there was a criminal group involved. The deputy secretary apologized to the councilors and expressed public regret for his comments. Weeks later, he was dismissed by order of the then Secretary of Education, Pauderney Avelino.

The issue resurfaced on March 16, 2016, when the Amazonas State Court of Auditors (TCE-AM) ordered Pauderney Avelino to return 4.6 million reais. He was also fined 23 thousand reais. According to an audit conducted by the Court, Avelino inflated rental contracts for 47 properties during his tenure as Secretary of Education of Manaus. The largest contract, worth 1.4 million, reais was awarded to the company Millennium Locadora Ltda, for a building housing the Sub-Secretary of Infrastructure and Logistics' storage facility. TCE-AM counselor Yara Lins identified six irregularities committed by Avelino, including the absence of property registration with the city hall and the fire department, lack of tax clearance certificates, and missing property tax (IPTU) documentation.

However, on March 30, the TCE-AM overturned the conviction. The defense argued that contradictions in the technical assessments invalidated the process. Counselor Yara Lins accepted the request, citing issues related to the land ownership of properties in the city, especially in areas subject to invasions or occupations.

=== Operation Car Wash ===
Pauderney Avelino's name was mentioned in a recording between the former president of Transpetro, Sérgio Machado, a whistleblower in the Operation Car Wash, and the president of the Senate, Renan Calheiros. In the recording, released by the G1 website, while referring to Pauderney, Machado says to Renan Calheiros: "How can you be so shameless, Renan? That guy, Pauderney, who is now being treated as a hero. There's no one more corrupt than him".
