= 2017 Amazonas gubernatorial special election =

- 6 August 2017 (first round); 27 August 2017 (second round)
- Turnout: 75.65% (first round); 74.18% (second round)
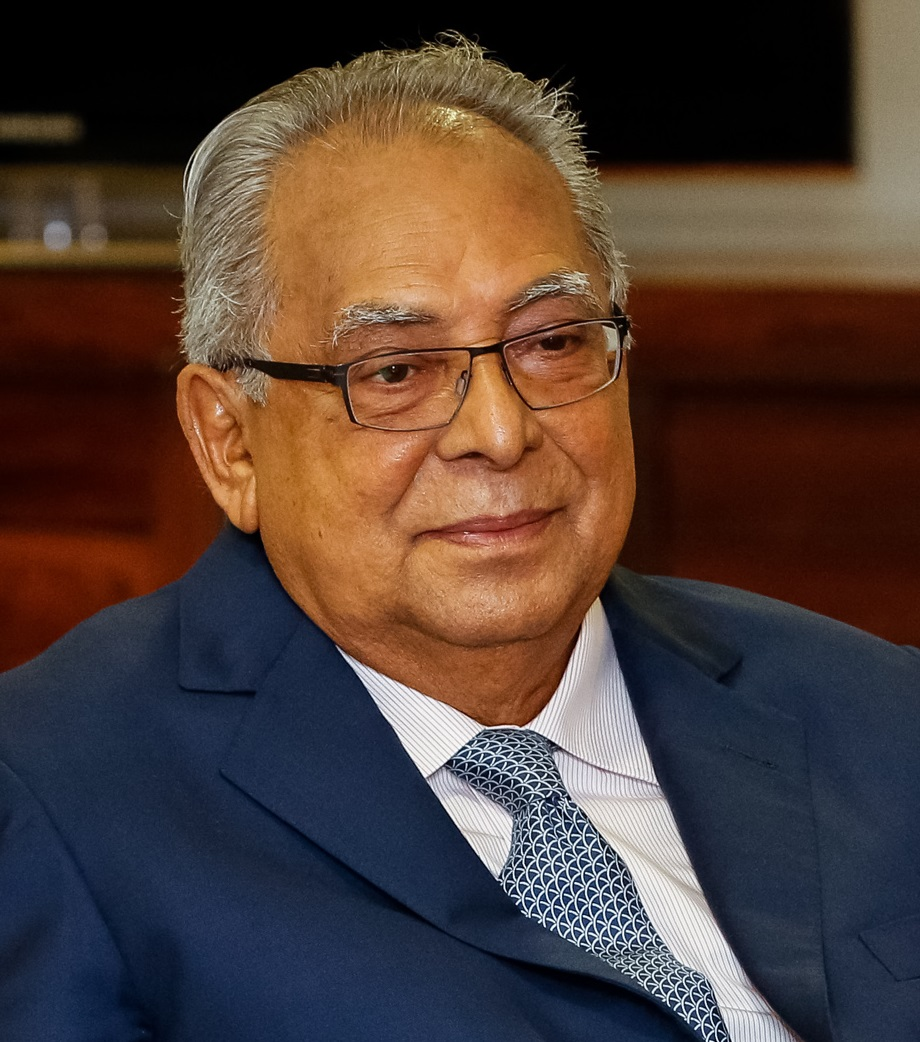

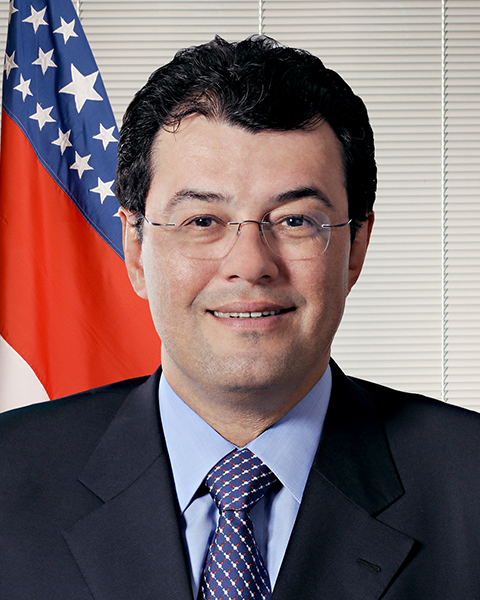
Candidate	Amazonino Mendes	Eduardo Braga
Party	PDT	MDB
Alliance	Movement for the Reconstruction of Amazonas	Union for Amazonas
Running mate	Bosco Saraiva	Marcelo Ramos
popular vote	782,933	539,318
Percentage	59.21%	40.79%
Governor before election
David Almeida
PSD
Elected Governor
Amazonino Mendes
PDT

The 2017 Amazonas gubernatorial special election was summoned by the Superior Electoral Court after the sentence that removed the Governor and Vice Governor of Amazonas from office, under the accusation of vote pairing. After that, the President of the Legislative Assembly of Amazonas assumed as Acting Governor until a new election could decide who would be the new head of Rio Negro Palace. Altogether, nine candidacies were registered for the voting. As none of them held more than 50% of the valid votes, a second round was held on 27 August with the two most voted candidates: Amazonino Mendes and Eduardo Braga. According to the Constitution, the new head of the state should complete the period commenced by his predecessor.

== Candidates ==
=== Candidates in runoff ===
Party	Gubernatorial candidate		Vice gubernatorial candidate (Note: Same party as the presidential candidate, unless mentioned in parentheses)		Coalition
Democratic Labour Party (PDT 12)	Amazonino Mendes	Amazonino Mendes; Mayor of Manaus (1983–1986, 1993–1994, 2009–2013); Governor of Amazonas (1987–1990, 1995–2003); Senator for Amazonas (1991–1993)	Bosco Saraiva	Bosco Saraiva (PSDB); State Deputy (2015–2017); Councillor of Manaus (1993–2005, 2013–2015)	Movement for the Reconstruction of Amazonas: Democratic Labour Party (PDT); Brazilian Social Democracy Party (PSDB); Social Democratic Party (PSD); Democrats (DEM); Brazilian Republican Party (PRB); Green Party (PV); Social Christian Party (PSC)
Brazilioan Democratic Movement Party (PMDB 15)	Eduardo Braga	Eduardo Braga; Senator for Amazonas (since 2011); Minister of Mines and Energy (2015–2016); Governor of Amazonas (2003–2010)	Marcelo Ramos	Marcelo Ramos (PR); State Deputy (2011–2015); Councillor of Manaus (2007–2011)	Union for Amazonas: Brazilian Democratic Movement Party (PMDB); Party of the Republic (PR); Brazilian Labour Party (PTB); Solidariedade (SD); Communist Party of Brazil (PCdoB); Christian Social Democratic Party (PSDC)

=== Candidates failing to make runoff ===
Party	Gubernatorial candidate		Vice gubernatorial candidate		Coalition
Progressive Party (PP 11)	Rebecca Garcia	Rebecca Garcia; Federal Deputy (2007–2015)		Felipe Souza (PODE); Councillor of Manaus (2013–2019)	Courage to Renew: Progressive Party (PP); Podemos (PODE); Labour Party of Brazil (PTdoB)
Workers' Party (PT 13)	José Ricardo Wendling	José Ricardo Wendling; State Deputy (2011–2019); Councillor of Manaus (2005–2011)	Sinésio Campos	Sinésio Campos; State Deputy (since 1999); Councillor of Manaus (1997–1999)	—N/a
Sustainability Network (REDE 18)	Luiz Castro	Luiz Castro; State Deputy (1999–2019)		João Tayah (PSOL)	The Beginning of a Great Change: Sustainability Network (REDE); Socialism and Liberty Party (PSOL)
Humanist Party of Solidarity (PHS 31)		Wilker Barreto; Councillor of Manaus (2009–2019)		Jacqueline Pinheiro; Councillor of Manaus (since 2013)	For a New Amazonas: Humanist Party of Solidarity (PHS); National Ecological Party (PEN); Brazilian Woman's Party (PMB); Christian Labour Party (PTC); Brazilian Labour Renewal Party (PRTB)
Brazilian Socialist Party (PSB 40)		Marcelo Serafim; Councillor of Manaus (since 2013); Federal Deputy (2007–2011)		Sirlan Cohen (PMN)	Courage and Attitude to Change Amazonas: Brazilian Socialist Party (PSB); Party of National Mobilization (PMN)
Free Fatherland Party (PPL 54)		Jardel Deltrudes		Fabiana Wilkens	—N/a

=== Candidacy denied ===
Party	Gubernatorial candidate	Vice gubernatorial candidate	Coalition
Popular Socialist Party (PPS 23)	Liliane Araújo	Jeverson Lobo	—N/a

== Debates ==
2017 Amazonas gubernatorial special election debates
No.	Date	Hosts	Moderators	Participants								
Key: P Present A Absent N Not invited				PDT	PMDB	PT	PPS	REDE	PSB	PP	PHS	PPS
Key: P Present A Absent N Not invited				Mendes	Braga	Wendling	Araújo	Castro	Serafim	Garcia	Barreto	Deltrudes
1.1	17 July 2017	Band Amazonas	Otávio Ceschi Jr.	A	A	P	P	P	P	P	P	N
1.2	3 August 2017	TV Amazonas, Rede Globo	Carlos Tramontina	P	P	P	P	P	P	P	P	N
2.1	25 August 2017	TV Amazonas, Rede Globo	José Roberto Burnier	A	P	—N/a						

== Results ==
Candidate	Running mate	Party	First round		Second round	
Candidate	Running mate	Party	Votes	%	Votes	%
Amazonino Mendes	Bosco Saraiva (PSDB)	PDT	577,397	38.77	782,933	59.21
Eduardo Braga	Marcelo Ramos (PR)	PMDB	377,680	25.36	539,318	40.79
Rebecca Garcia	Felipe Souza (PODE)	PP	268,922	18.06		
José Ricardo Wendling	Sinésio Campos	PT	181,257	12.17		
Luiz Castro	João Tayah (PSOL)	REDE	39,240	2.63		
Wilker Barreto	Jacqueline Pinheiro	PHS	22,623	1.52		
Marcelo Serafim	Sirlan Cohen (PMN)	PSB	18,877	1.27		
Jardel Deltrudes	Fabiana Wilkens	PPL	3,362	0.23		
Total			1,489,358	100.00	1,322,251	100.00
Valid votes			1,489,358	84.17	1,322,251	76.21
Invalid votes			218,201	12.33	342,280	19.73
Blank votes			61,826	3.49	70,441	4.06
Total votes			1,769,385	100.00	1,734,972	100.00
Registered voters/turnout			2,338,886	75.65	2,338,886	74.18
Source: Electoral Justice and G1

Popular vote (first round)
Mendes	38.77%
Braga	25.36%
Garcia	18.06%
Wendling	12.17%
Others	5.65%

Popular vote (second round)
Mendes	59.21%
Braga	40.79%
