= Plínio Valério =

Brazilian politician

Senator for Amazonas
- Incumbent
- Assumed office 1 February 2019

Councillor of Manaus
- In office 1 January 2013 – 1 February 2019
- Constituency: At-large

Federal Deputy
- In office 6 March 2013 – 27 November 2013
- Constituency: Amazonas

Personal details
- Born: Francisco Plínio Valério Tomaz; 31 January 1955 (age 71) Eirunepé, Amazonas, Brazil
- Party: PSDB (since 2011)
- Other political affiliations: PDT (1979–2001); PV (2001–2007); PTB (2007–2009); DEM (2009–2011)
- Education: Federal University of Amazonas
- Profession: Journalist

Francisco Plínio Valério Tomaz (born 31 January 1955) is a Brazilian journalist and politician, member of the Brazilian Social Democracy Party (PSDB), serving as senator for the state of Amazonas since 2019.

== History ==
Valério was elected councillor of Manaus in 2012. In 2013, he had served as federal deputy for Amazonas for 8 months as a surrogate. Valério returned to the Municipal Chamber and was re-elected as councillor in the 2016 municipal elections.

In the 2018 state elections, he was elected senator for Amazonas on the 1st seat, with 834,809 votes, running for the Brazilian Social Democracy Party (PSDB). During his term, Valério proposed bills to fix terms for Supreme Court justices and Central Bank directors, open parliamentary inquiry commissions to investigate NGOs working in the Brazilian Amazon and Supreme Court justices. In June 2019, Valério voted against the government Guns Decree, which made gun ownership and carry more flexible for civilians.

According to newspaper De Olho nos Ruralistas, Valério has a chalet inside Tupé Sustainable Development Reserve, a natural reserve in Manaus, where he rent in Airbnb.

== Electoral history ==
Year	Election	Party	Office	Coalition	Partners	Party	Votes	Percent	Result
2002	State Elections of Amazonas	PV	Senator	For Love to Amazonas (PSB, PPB, PTC, PV)	Judite Pinho	PV	265,861	12.85%	Not elected
2004	Municipal Election of Manaus	PV	Mayor	—N/a	Tony Medeiros	PV	76,896	10.24%	Not elected
2006	State Elections of Amazonas	PV	Senator	—N/a	Neuzimar Pinheiro	PV	158,333	11.94%	Not elected
2006	State Elections of Amazonas	PV	Senator	—N/a	Gerson Duarte	PV	158,333	11.94%	Not elected
2010	State Elections of Amazonas	DEM	Federal Deputy	Advance Amazonas (PMN, PMDB, PCdoB, PP, PSC, PRB, DEM, PTB, PRP, PTN, PTC, PRTB, PHS)	—N/a		79,499	5.52%	Surrogate
2012	Municipal Election of Manaus	PSDB	Councillor	The Future is Now (PSDB, PPS, PTC)	—N/a		12,053	1.28%	Elected
2014	State Elections of Amazonas	PSDB	State Deputy	Doing More for Our People 1 (PROS, PSD, PSDB, PSC)	—N/a		12,343	0.76%	Surrogate
2016	Municipal Election of Manaus	PSDB	Councillor	—N/a			8,348	0.81%	Elected
2018	State Elections of Amazonas	PSDB	Senator	Amazonas with Safety (PSD, PSDB, DEM, PRB, PTC, PATRI)	Carlos Alberto	Republicanos	834,809	25.36%	Elected
2018	State Elections of Amazonas	PSDB	Senator	Amazonas with Safety (PSD, PSDB, DEM, PRB, PTC, PATRI)	Jacira Souza	PSDB	834,809	25.36%	Elected
