= David Almeida =

Brazilian lawyer and politician

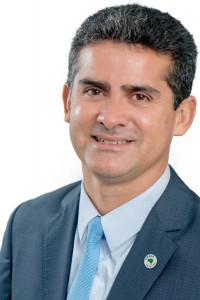

55th Mayor of Manaus
- Incumbent
- Assumed office January 1, 2021
- Preceded by: Arthur Virgílio Neto

Interim Governor of Amazonas
- In office May 9, 2017 – October 4, 2017
- Preceded by: José Melo de Oliveira
- Succeeded by: Amazonino Mendes

President of the Amazonas Legislative Assembly
- In office February 1, 2017 – February 1, 2019
- Preceded by: Josué Neto
- Succeeded by: Josué Neto

Member of the Amazonas Legislative Assembly
- In office February 1, 2007 – February 1, 2019

Personal details
- Born: David Antônio Abisai Pereira de Almeida; February 8, 1969 (age 57) Manaus, Amazonas, Brazil
- Party: Avante

David Antônio Abisai Pereira de Almeida (born February 8, 1969), better known as David Almeida, is a Brazilian lawyer and politician affiliated to the Avante. He was elected mayor of Manaus in the municipal elections of Brazil in 2020. In 2017 he was interim Governor of Amazonas after the annulment of José Melo de Oliveira and his vice-governor by TSE (Superior Electoral Court), due to problems in Brazilian justice. The Brazilian Constitution establishes that the annulment of a governor and his vice-governor, temporarily declares the presidency of the Legislative Assembly during the year, until the supplementary internal elections, from which they occurred in 2017, at the time Almeida was president of the legislative authority of the state of Amazonas. In 2020, David Almeida was elected mayor of the city of Manaus by the Avante, turning over the votes in the second round on Amazonino Mendes, of PODE, which ended first in the first round, succeeding Arthur Virgílio Neto, for the 2021–2025 term.

== Controversies and Criminal Investigations ==
During his tenure in the municipal executive branch, David Almeida became the target of multiple criminal and electoral investigations conducted by the state judiciary and the Federal Police.

=== Investigations in the State Court (TJAM) ===
In November 2025, the Court of Justice of Amazonas (TJAM) authorized the opening of seven criminal investigations against David Almeida, acting upon requests submitted by the State Public Prosecutor's Office (MP-AM). The progression of this package of inquiries, which required judicial approval due to his prerogative of forum, had previously passed through five different rapporteurs over a 13-month period before being validated by Judge Vânia Marques Marinho.

The court-authorized investigations examine allegations of corruption and crimes against public administration, encompassing several key points:

- Alleged irregularities regarding personal trips taken by the mayor, including a trip to the Caribbean;
- Suspicions of illicit favoritism and irregular contracts signed by the Municipality of Manaus with suppliers who held family relationships or close ties with relatives of the mayor.

In an official statement at the time, the Municipality of Manaus stated that it had not received prior notification and maintained that all expenses associated with the mayor's private travels were paid in full using his personal funds.

=== Electoral Corruption and Vote-Buying Inquiry ===
Parallel to the actions in the state court, David Almeida was named as an investigated party in an inquiry conducted by the Federal Police (PF) examining a vote-buying scheme during the 2024 municipal elections, in which he ran for re-election. The case originated from a police operation executed on the eve of the runoff election, which resulted in the seizure of cash and mobile devices from leaders of the United Pentecostal Church of Brazil (IPUB).

In March 2026, Federal Police forensic reports, based on court-ordered wiretaps and data extraction from the seized cell phones, indicated that Gabriel Alexandre da Silva Lima—David Almeida's son-in-law—had acted directly as an intermediary in financial negotiations with religious leaders to secure electoral support. Transcripts of audio files and text messages included in the forensic reports revealed explicit conversations linking large cash transfers to requests for congregants to promote the candidate's campaign number on social media. Due to the volume of data and the necessity for deeper technical analysis, the Federal Court accepted a request from the Federal Police and extended the investigation period for an additional 90 days.

Political offices
Preceded by Arthur Virgílio Neto	Mayor of Manaus; 2021–2025	Succeeded by
Preceded by José Melo de Oliveira	Interim Governor of Amazonas; 2017	Succeeded by Amazonino Mendes
