= Omar Aziz =

Brazilian politician (born 1958)

Governor-elect of Amazonas
- Assuming office 6 January 2027
- Vice Governor: Alessandra Campelo (elect)
- Succeeding: Roberto Cidade
- In office 31 March 2010 – 4 April 2014
- Vice Governor: None (Mar–Dec 2010); José Melo de Oliveira (2011–2014)
- Preceded by: Eduardo Braga
- Succeeded by: José Melo de Oliveira

Senator for Amazonas
- Incumbent
- Assumed office 1 February 2015

Vice Governor of Amazonas
- In office 1 January 2003 – 31 March 2010
- Governor: Eduardo Braga
- Preceded by: Samuel Assayag Hanan
- Succeeded by: José Melo de Oliveira

Vice Mayor of Manaus
- In office 1 January 1997 – 11 March 2002
- Mayor: Alfredo Nascimento
- Preceded by: Eduardo Braga
- Succeeded by: Mário Frota

State Deputy of Amazonas
- In office 1 January 1991 – 1 January 1995

Personal details
- Born: 13 August 1958 (age 68) Garça, São Paulo, Brazil
- Party: PSD (2011–present)
- Other political affiliations: PCdoB (1975–1985); PFL (1985–1989); PDC (1989–1993); PPR (1993–1995); PP (1995–1996); DEM (1996–2004); PMN (2004–2011)

Omar José Abdel Aziz (Brazilian Portuguese: [oˈmaʁ aˈzis]; born November 9, 1958) is a Brazilian politician, and the governor-elect of the Brazilian state of Amazonas. He previously served as the governor of Amazonas from March 31, 2010, to 2014, following the resignation of his predecessor, Eduardo Braga, to become a Senator.

Member of a family of Arab and Italian descent, Omar has already held the post of Alderman in Manaus and Amazonas State Assemblyman in the 1990. In 1996, he was elected Deputy Mayor of Manaus with Alfredo Nascimento as holder in Office. In 2000, were re-elected, but in May 2002, Omar left the post to compete with Eduardo Braga plate to the State Government as deputy-governor, election in which they were elected.

In 2006, he was reelected with Braga. In 2008 was apply for as mayor of Manaus by PMN, having won the third place. In 2010, with the resignation of Braga to the State Government to run for Senate, Aziz took over the Government.

In the elections of that year, he was re-elected Governor in the first round with 64% of the vote. In 2011, was one of the co-founders of the Social Democratic Party (PSD). Did the same as Braga in 2014 leaving the office of Governor and your vice-Governor, José Melo de Oliveira, took the office.

On October 25, 2026, Aziz was re-elected as governor of Amazonas, winning the runoff election with 61.42% of the vote.

Political offices
Preceded by Eduardo Braga	Governor of Amazonas; 2010–2014	Succeeded by José Melo de Oliveira
Preceded by Roberto Cidade	Governor of Amazonas; Taking office 2027	Elect
