= Mayara Pinheiro =

Brazilian politician (born 1987)

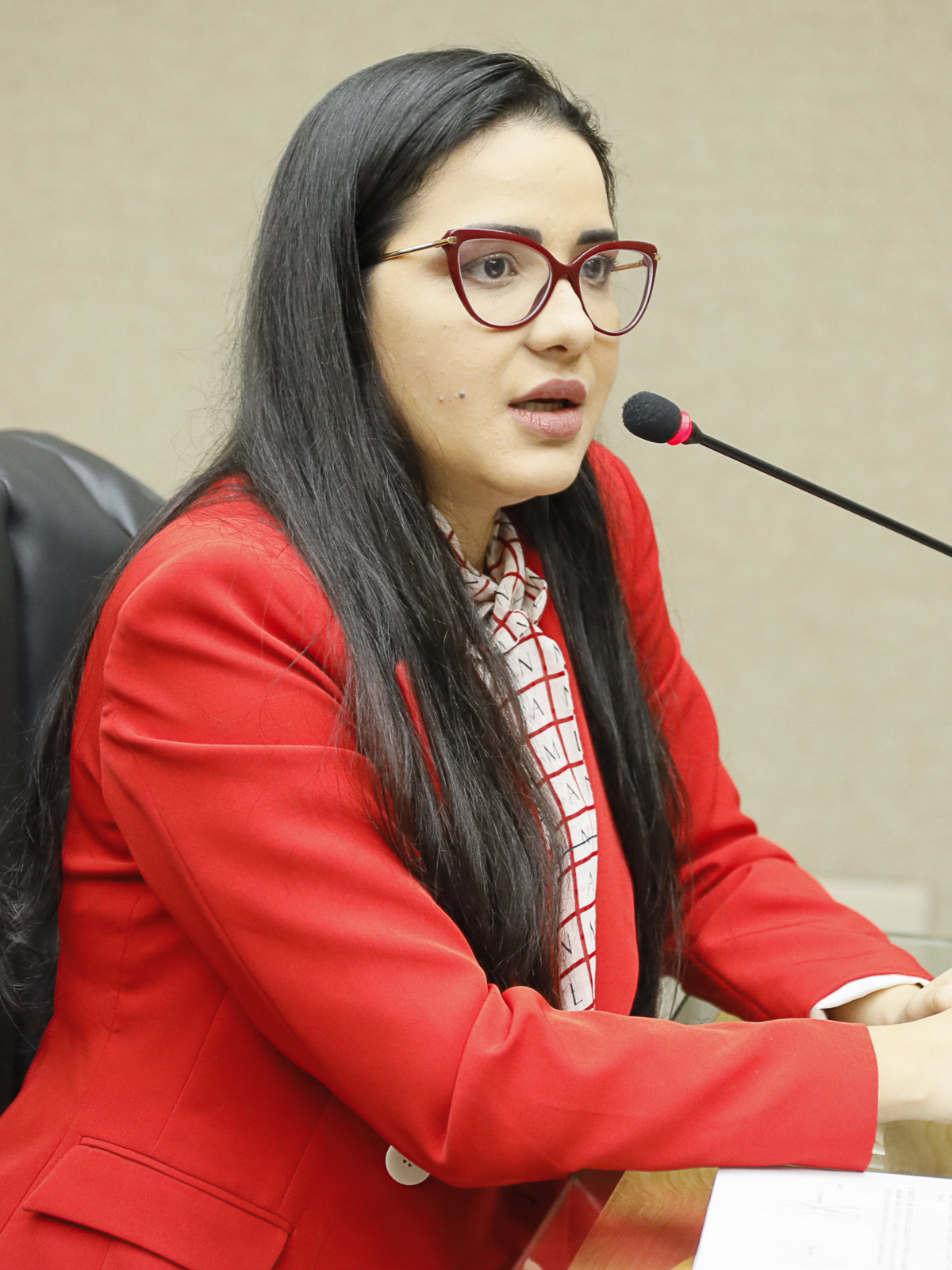
- Pinheiro in 2022

Member of the Legislative Assembly of Amazonas
- Incumbent
- Assumed office 1 February 2019

Personal details
- Born: 13 April 1987 (age 39)
- Party: Republicans (since 2022)
- Parent: Adail Pinheiro (father)
- Relatives: Adail Filho (brother)

Mayara Monique Figueiredo Pinheiro Reis (born 13 April 1987) is a Brazilian politician serving as a member of the Legislative Assembly of Amazonas since 2019. From 2017 to 2019, she served as deputy mayor of Coari.
