= 2010 Amazonas general election =

2010 Amazonas gubernatorial election
- October 3, 2010
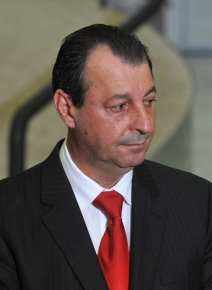

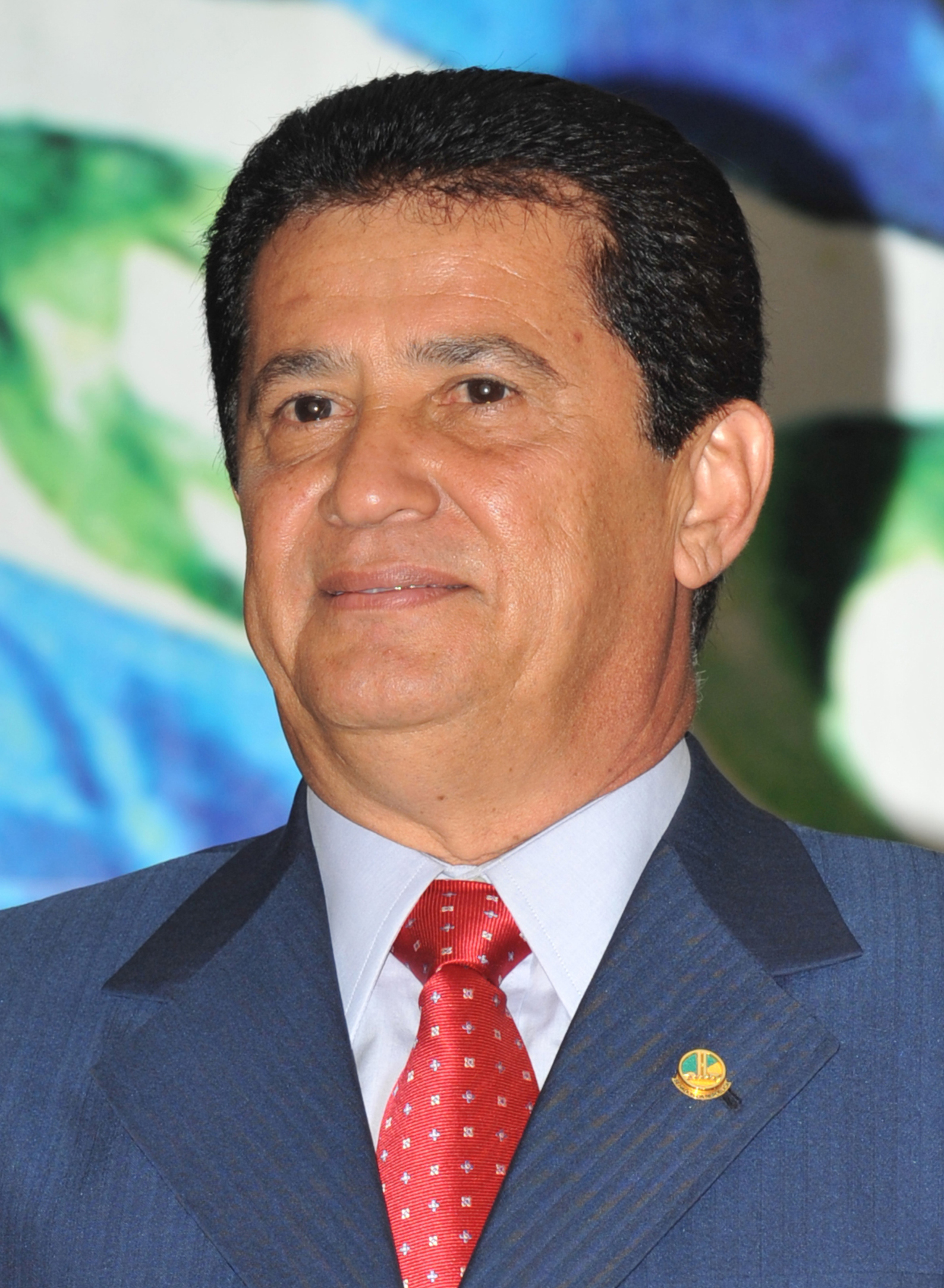
Nominee	Omar Aziz	Alfredo Nascimento	Hissa Abrahão
Party	PMN	PR	PPS
Running mate	José Melo de Oliveira	Serafim Corrêa	Mario Mendes
Popular vote	943,955	382,935	138,281
Percentage	63.87%	25.91%	9.36%
Governor before election
Omar Aziz
PMN
Elected Governor
Omar Aziz
PMN

The Amazonas gubernatorial election was held on October 3, 2010, to elect the next governor of Amazonas. The PMN's Omar Aziz comfortably won reelection.
