= Arthur Virgílio Neto =

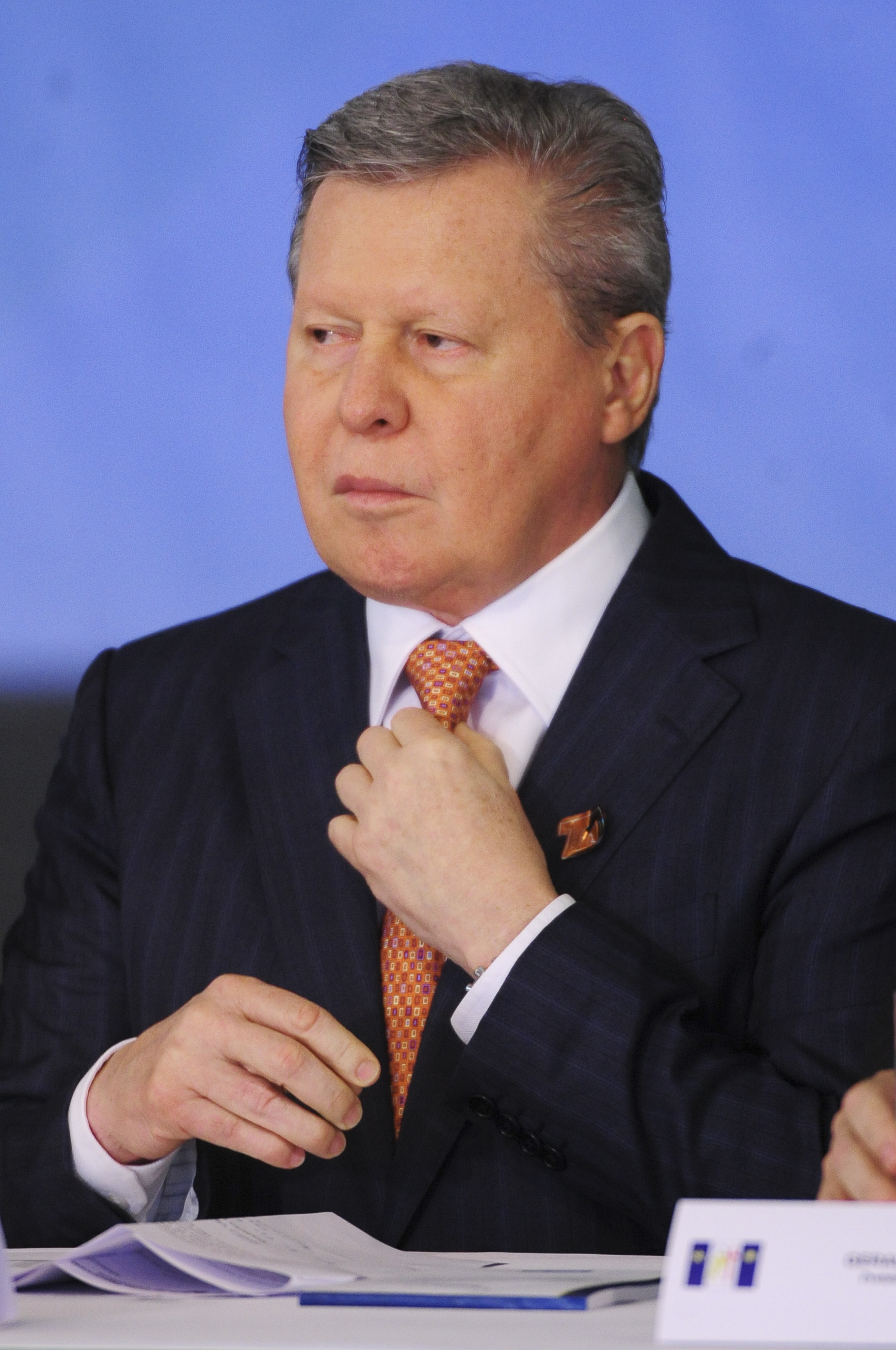

Mayor of Manaus
- In office 1 January 2013 – 1 January 2021
- Vice Mayor: Hissa Abrahão; Marcos Rotta
- Preceded by: Amazonino Mendes
- Succeeded by: David Almeida
- In office 1 January 1989 – 1 January 1993
- Vice Mayor: Félix Valois Júnior
- Preceded by: Manoel Henriques Ribeiro
- Succeeded by: Amazonino Mendes

Senator for Amazonas
- In office 1 February 2003 – 1 February 2011

Secretary-General of the Presidency
- In office 14 November 2001 – 3 April 2002
- President: Fernando Henrique Cardoso
- Preceded by: Aloysio Nunes
- Succeeded by: Euclides Scalco

Federal Deputy
- In office 1 February 1995 – 1 February 2003
- Constituency: Amazonas
- In office 1 February 1983 – 1 February 1987
- Constituency: Amazonas

Personal details
- Born: Arthur Virgílio do Carmo Ribeiro Neto; 15 November 1945 (age 80) Manaus, Amazonas, Brazil
- Party: MDB (1969–1985; 2026–present)
- Other political affiliations: PCB (1967–1969); PSB (1985–1989); PSDB (1989–2025); Republicanos (2025–2026)
- Awards: Order of Military Merit (Grand Officer - Grande-Oficial)

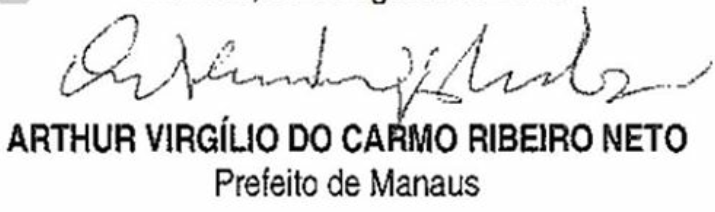
- Signature
- Arthur Virgílio Neto's voice Recorded on 30 October 2005

Arthur Virgilio do Carmo Ribeiro Neto (born 15 November 1945) better known as Arthur Virgilio or Arthur Neto, is a Brazilian politician and lawyer, career diplomat, member and one of the founders of the Brazilian Social Democracy Party. Since 2013, he serves as the mayor of his hometown Manaus, being re-elected for the office in 2016. Prior, Virgílio Neto already served as mayor of Manaus from 1989 to 1992.

== Early life ==
Virgilio first worked as a columnist for Tribuna da Imprensa, before attending the Faculty of Law of the Federal University of Rio de Janeiro. He had, prior to this, received degrees in diplomacy and international relations from the University of Brasília and University of Brasília. After graduating from the Faculty of Law, he became the Secretary of the Department of International Organizations for the Ministry of Foreign Affairs.

== Political career ==
Virgilio Neto was elected twice to the Brazilian Chamber of Deputies between 1982 and 1986 and was a Senator for the State of Amazonas. He became one of the opposition leaders in the Brazilian senate of then-President Lula da Silva.

In 1988, he won the mayorship of Manaus with 138,000 votes, or 48% of the valid votes. He defeated former governor and PMDB candidate Gilberto Mestrinho, who received 38% of the vote. At the time, the election was seen as a triumph of grassroots mobilization, as Mestrinho had held long-standing dominance over the politics of Amazonas, and was also seen as a populist breakthrough.

After serving as a term for mayor, he returned to being a federal deputy, where he served as a leader in Fernando Henrique Cardoso's government. Eventually, Cardoso appointed him as Chief Minister of the General Secretariat of the Presidency of the Republic in October 2001 after Aloysio Nunes Ferreira moved to the Ministry of Justice. However, he made it explicit that he would leave the office by April to run in the 2002 elections.

== See also ==
- List of mayors of Manaus

Political offices
| Preceded by Manoel Henriques Ribeiro | Mayor of Manaus; 1989–1993 | Succeeded by Amazonino Mendes |
| Preceded by Aloysio Nunes | Secretary-General of the Presidency; 2001–2002 | Succeeded by Euclides Scalco |
| Preceded by Amazonino Mendes | Mayor of Manaus; 2013–2021 | Succeeded by David Almeida |
