= Elaíze Farias =

Brazilian journalist

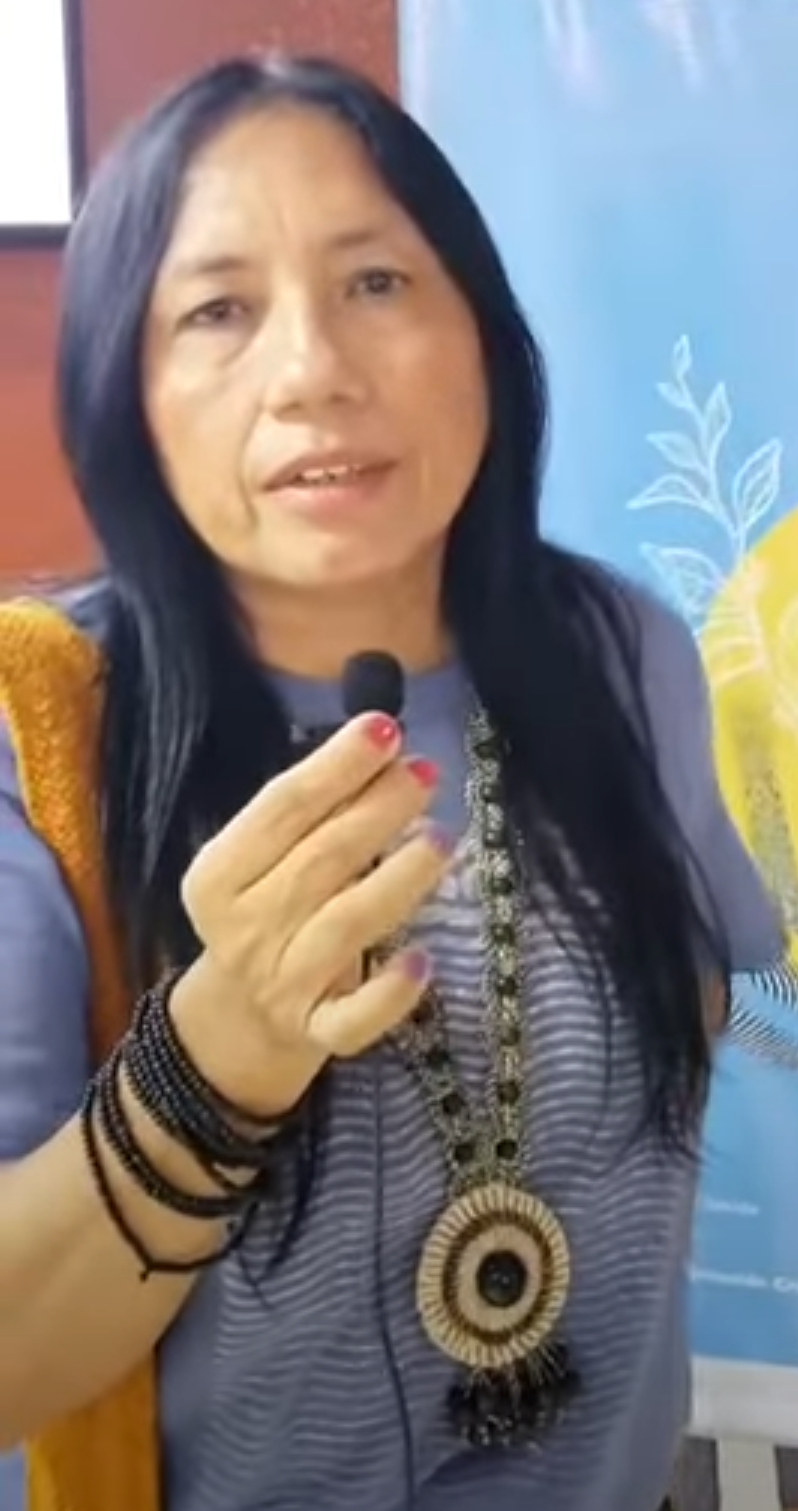
- In an Oxfam video in 2023
- Born: Parintins, Amazonas, Brazil
- Education: Federal University of Amazonas
- Occupation: Journalist
- Awards: Vladimir Herzog Award (2022)

Elaíze Farias is a Brazilian journalist. She is known for her reporting on indigenous and environmental issues in the North Region of Brazil.

== Biography ==
Farias was born and raised in Parintins, Amazonas. Her maternal family is Mawé. She moved to Manaus, the state capital, at the age of 17, and studied journalism at the Federal University of Amazonas.

While Farias was still a student, she started her journalism career, initially as a culture reporter for various local news outlets in Manaus. In 2003, she decided to focus on social issues, with her early articles reporting on citizens in Manaus' struggles accessing water and electricity. Farias' work was published in local, national and international newspapers, including A Crítica, Diário do Amazonas, Jornal GGN, El País and Americas Quarterly.

Farias felt that media outlets were not interested in indigenous and environmental issues and that they were focused on issues in the Southeast Region. In October 2013, she co-founded Amazônia Real, an indigenous-run media outlet based in Manaus, alongside Katia Brásil and Liege Albuquerque. Farias described Amazônia Real's philosophy as being based on postcolonial journalism, countering what she considered to be mainstream Brazilian media's "monolithic" and "exoticised" presentation of indigenous communities in the country.

In 2017, Amazônia Real was named as one of Latin America's top 100 digital news startups by SembriaMedia. In 2018, it was awarded the King of Spain International Journalism Award for the Most Outstanding Outlet in Ibero-America.

In 2021, Farias was honoured, alongside Brásil, at the 16th International Congress of Investigative Journalism, organised by the Brazilian Association of Investigative Journalism (ABRAJI). In 2025, to mark the 20th anniversary of ABRAJI's first conference, Farias and Brásil were recognised as two of 21 "icons of Brazilian journalism"; they were among three journalists commemorated from the North Region, alongside Lúcio Flávio Pinto, who also wrote for Amazônia Real.

In 2022, Farias received the Vladimir Herzog Award in recognition of her work reporting on human rights in Brazil.

In 2023, Farias received a Global Human Rights Defender Award from the United States Department of State in recognition of Amazônia Real's reporting, including on the murders of Dom Philips and Bruno Pereira in the Amazon rainforest.

Farias has also been awarded the Embratel Press Prize, the Onça-Pintada Prize for Journalism and the Fapeam Prize for Scientific Journalism.

In 2013, a short film entitled Amazon Attack and directed by Elizabeth Rocha Salgado focusing on Farias' activism for the protection of the Amazon.
