= 2014 Amazonas general election =

2014 Amazonas gubernatorial election
- October 5, 2014
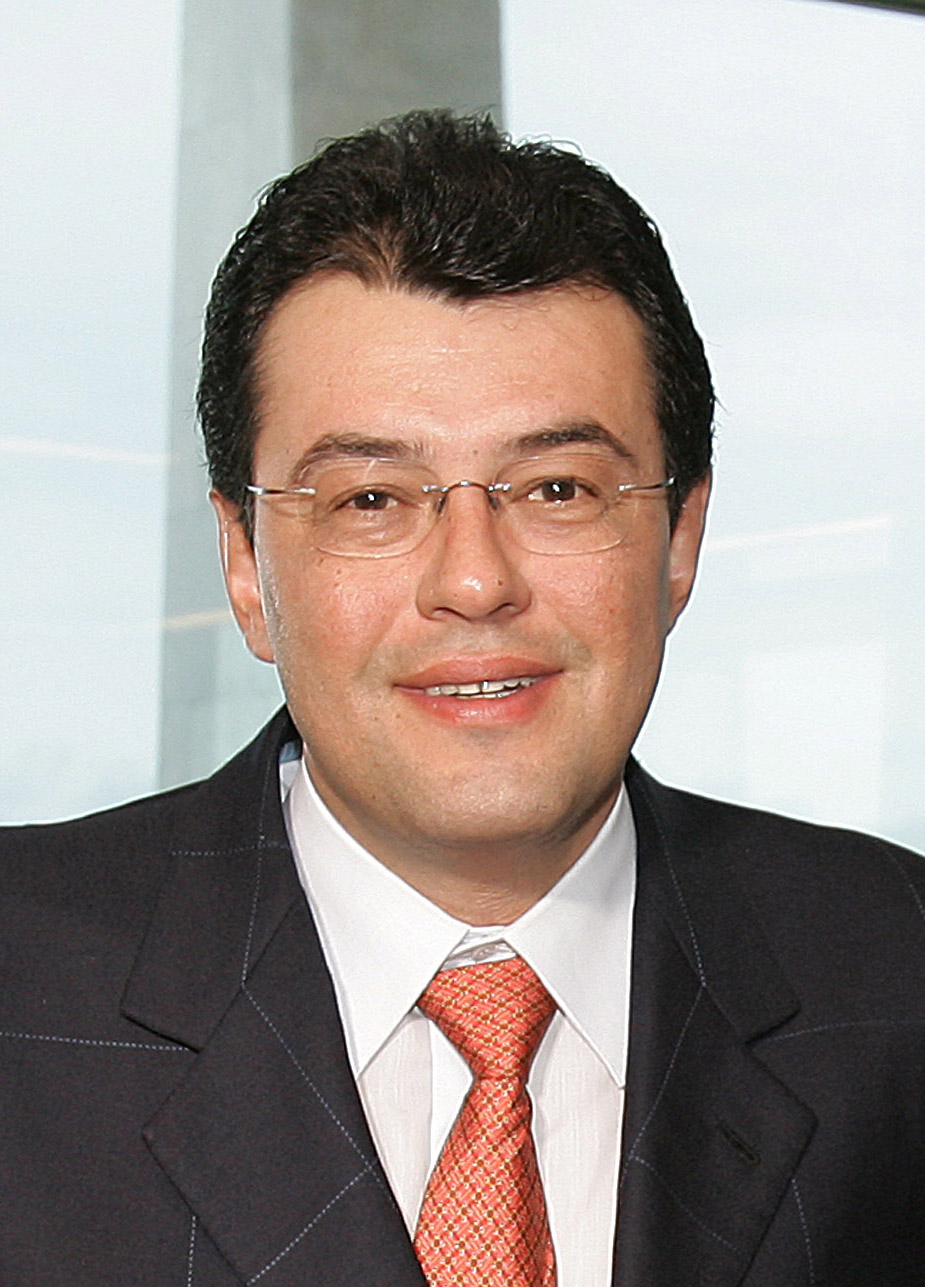
Nominee	Eduardo Braga	José Melo	Marcelo Ramos
Party	MDB	PROS	PSB
Running mate	Rebecca Garcia	Henrique Oliveira	Júnior César Brasil
Governor before election
José Melo
Republican Party of the Social Order
Elected Governor
José Melo
Republican Party of the Social Order

The Amazonas gubernatorial election was held on 5 October 2014 to elect the next governor of the state of Amazonas. If no candidate had received more than 50% of the vote, a second-round runoff election would've been held on 26 October. In the election Governor José Melo ran for his first full term after assuming the Governorship in April 2014, and he won. After the election, José Melo de Oliveira continues to serve as the 47th Governor of Amazonas until 31 March 2017.
