= Vivaldo Frota =

Brazilian politician, lawyer, and academic

42nd Governor of Amazonas
- In office April 2, 1990 – March 15, 1991
- Preceded by: Amazonino Mendes
- Succeeded by: Gilberto Mestrinho

Vice Governor of Amazonas
- In office 1987 – April 2, 1990
- Governor: Amazonino Mendes
- Preceded by: Manoel Henriques Ribeiro
- Succeeded by: Francisco Garcia Rodrigues

Personal details
- Born: December 7, 1928 Boca do Acre, Amazonas, Brazil
- Died: January 16, 2015 (aged 86) Manaus, Amazonas
- Spouse: Magnólia Frota
- Profession: Lawyer; Politician; Academic

Vivaldo Barros Frota (December 7, 1928 – January 16, 2015) was a Brazilian politician, lawyer, and academic. Frota was first elected Vice Governor of Amazonas in 1987. He became Governor of the state of Amazonas on April 2, 1990, after his predecessor, outgoing Governor Amazonino Mendes, resigned to run for the Federal Senate. Frota served as Governor until March 15, 1991.

Frota died of stomach cancer at the Hospital Beneficente Português in Manaus on January 16, 2015, at the age of 86.

Political offices
Preceded by Amazonino Mendes	Governor of Amazonas; 1990–1991	Succeeded by Gilberto Mestrinho
