= José de Oliveira Fernandes =

Brazilian politician (1943–2020)

José Fernandes

Federal Deputy for Amazonas
- In office 1979–1991

Mayor of Manaus
- In office 1979–1982
- Preceded by: Jorge Teixeira
- Succeeded by: Mendonça Furtado

Personal details
- Born: December 1, 1943 Careiro, Amazonas, Brazil
- Died: 12 October 2020 (aged 76) Manaus, Amazonas, Brazil
- Party: National Renewal Alliance, Democratic Social Party, Democratic Labour Party, Social Labour Party, Progressistas

José de Oliveira Fernandes (1 December 1943 — 12 October 2020) was a Brazilian politician, economist and university professor. He served as mayor of Manaus and member of the Chamber of Deputies, as well as federal Secretary of Housing and Urbanism and Secretary of Works.

== Biography ==
Fernandes was born in Careiro on 1 December 1943. The son of Benjamim Matias Fernandes and Maria de Oliveira Fernandes, he graduated in Economy in 1968 at the Federal University of Amazonas and specialized with the United Nations Economic Commission for Latin America and the Caribbean on the following year. In 1970 he became head professor of the Federal University of Amazonas and advisor to the Department of Highways of Amazonas, a position which he kept for a year. Appointed Secretary of Transport in 1975 by governor Enoque Reis, he left office in 1978 when he was elected federal deputy of the Amazonas.

Approximately 45 days after his inauguration, he asked governor José Lindoso to be appointed mayor of Manaus, remaining in office for three years (his seat in the Chamber of Deputies was occupied by Ubaldino Meireles), until he resigned in order to be reelected federal deputy by the Democratic Social Party (PDS) in the 1982 elections. In the new legislature he missed the vote on the Dante de Oliveira amendment in 1984 and voted for Paulo Maluf in the 1985 Brazilian presidential election.

In the 1986 elections, Fernandes entered the Democratic Labour Party (PDT) and was re-elected to join the National Constituent Assembly responsible for 1988 Brazilian Constitution; at the beginning of the Collor Government he migrated to the Social Labor Party (PST), which he led in the Chamber of Deputies, but was not re-elected in the 1990 elections. After leaving Brasília, he worked in the private sector in a construction company and later as general director of the Boas Novas television network. In the second Amazonino Mendes government he was Secretary of Housing and Urbanism and later Secretary of Works.

Fernandes died on October 12, 2020, at the age of 76, from complications of COVID-19 during the COVID-19 pandemic in Brazil.
