= Bosco Saraiva =

Brazilian politician

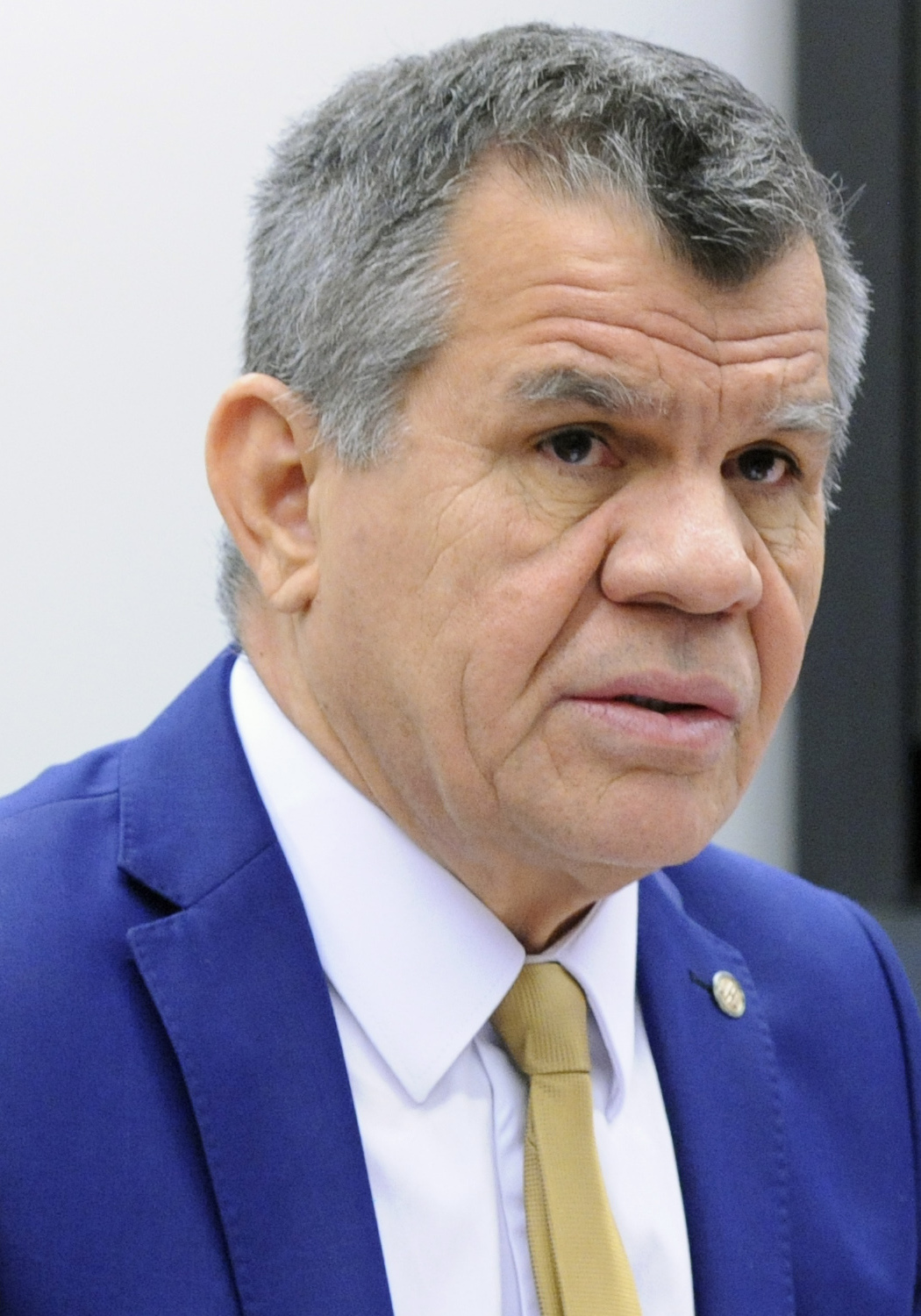
- Saraiva in May 2019

Federal Deputy for Amazonas
- Incumbent
- Assumed office 1 February 2019

Vice-Governor of Amazonas
- In office 4 October 2017 – 1 January 2019
- Governor: Amazonino Mendes
- Preceded by: Henrique Oliveira
- Succeeded by: Carlos Almeida

State Deputy for Amazonas
- In office 1 February 2015 – 4 October 2017

Vereador for Manaus
- In office 1 January 2013 – 31 December 2014
- In office 1 January 1993 – 31 December 2004

Personal details
- Born: João Bosco Gomes Saraiva; 10 October 1959 (age 66) Manaus, Amazonas, Brazil
- Party: SD
- Profession: businessman, writer, professor

João Bosco Gomes Saraiva (born 10 October 1959) often simply known as Bosco Saraiva is a Brazilian politician and businessman. Born in Amazonas, he has served as a state representative since 2019, having also served as vice governor and in the state legislature.

== Personal life ==
Saraiva is married to Bruna Lorena Passos Saraiva and is an alumnus of the Universidade Paulista (UNIP). Aside from being a politician he is also a professor, writer, and businessman.

== Political career ==
Saraiva was elected to the legislative assembly of Amazonas in the 2014 local election with 22,822 votes under the Brazilian Social Democracy Party's banner. In October 2017, Amazonino Mendes was elected governor of the state and chose Saraiva as his vice-governor. In the 2018 Brazilian general election, he was elected to the federal chamber of deputies, being one of the most voted candidates in the state of Amazonas. He is also the head of the solidarity party in the state of Amazonas.
