= Roberto Cidade =

Brazilian politician (born 1986)

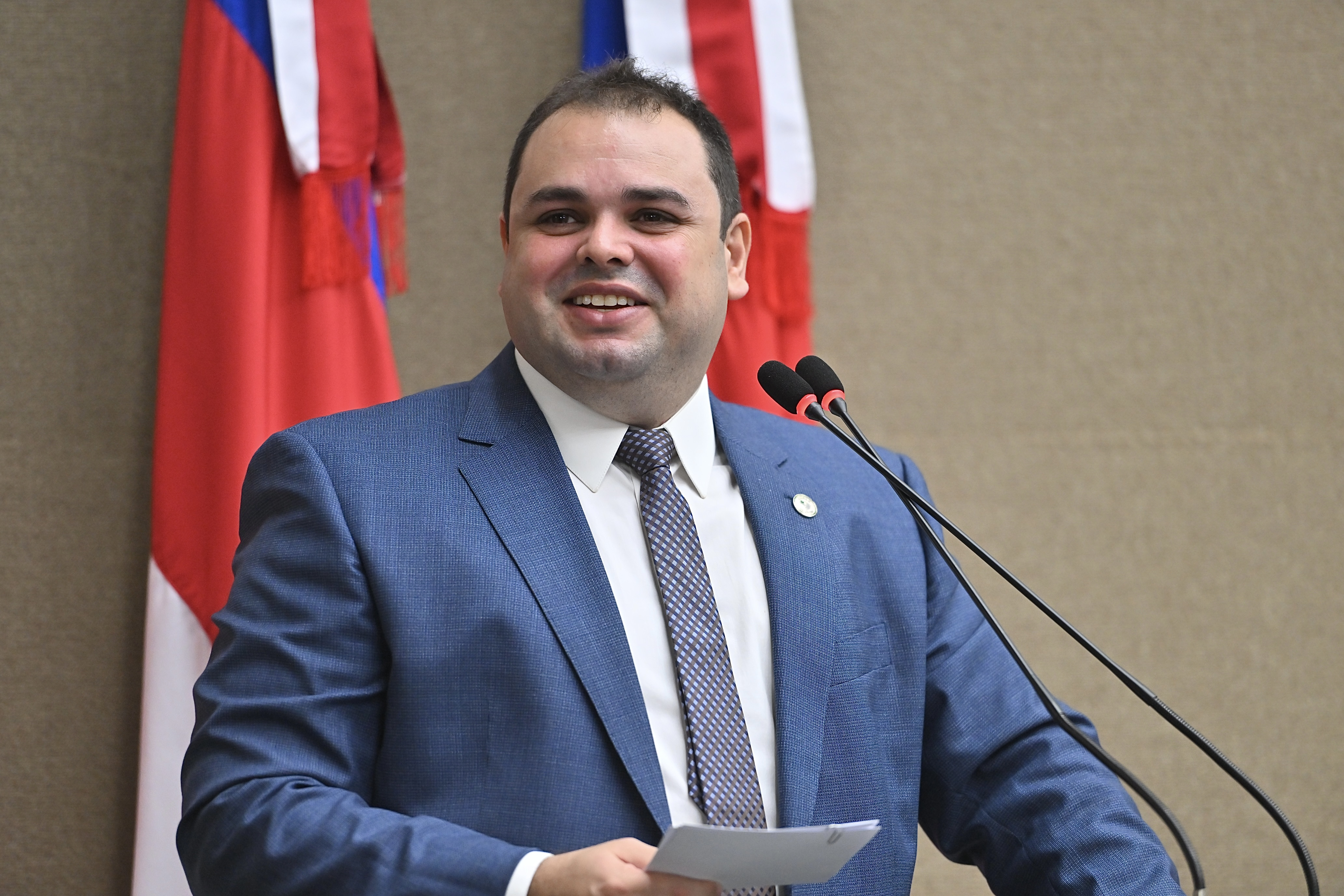
- Cidade in 2023

Governor of Amazonas
- Incumbent
- Assumed office 4 May 2026; Acting: 4 April – 4 May 2026
- Vice Governor: Serafim Corrêa
- Preceded by: Wilson Lima

President of the Legislative Assembly of Amazonas
- In office 2 February 2021 – 4 May 2026
- Preceded by: Josué Neto

Personal details
- Born: 2 October 1986 (age 40)
- Party: Brazil Union (since 2022)

Roberto Maia Cidade Filho (born 2 October 1986) is a Brazilian politician who has served as Governor of Amazonas since 2026. He was member of the Legislative Assembly of Amazonas from 2019 to 2026, and served as its president from 2021 to 2026.
