= Adail Filho =

Brazilian politician (born 1992)

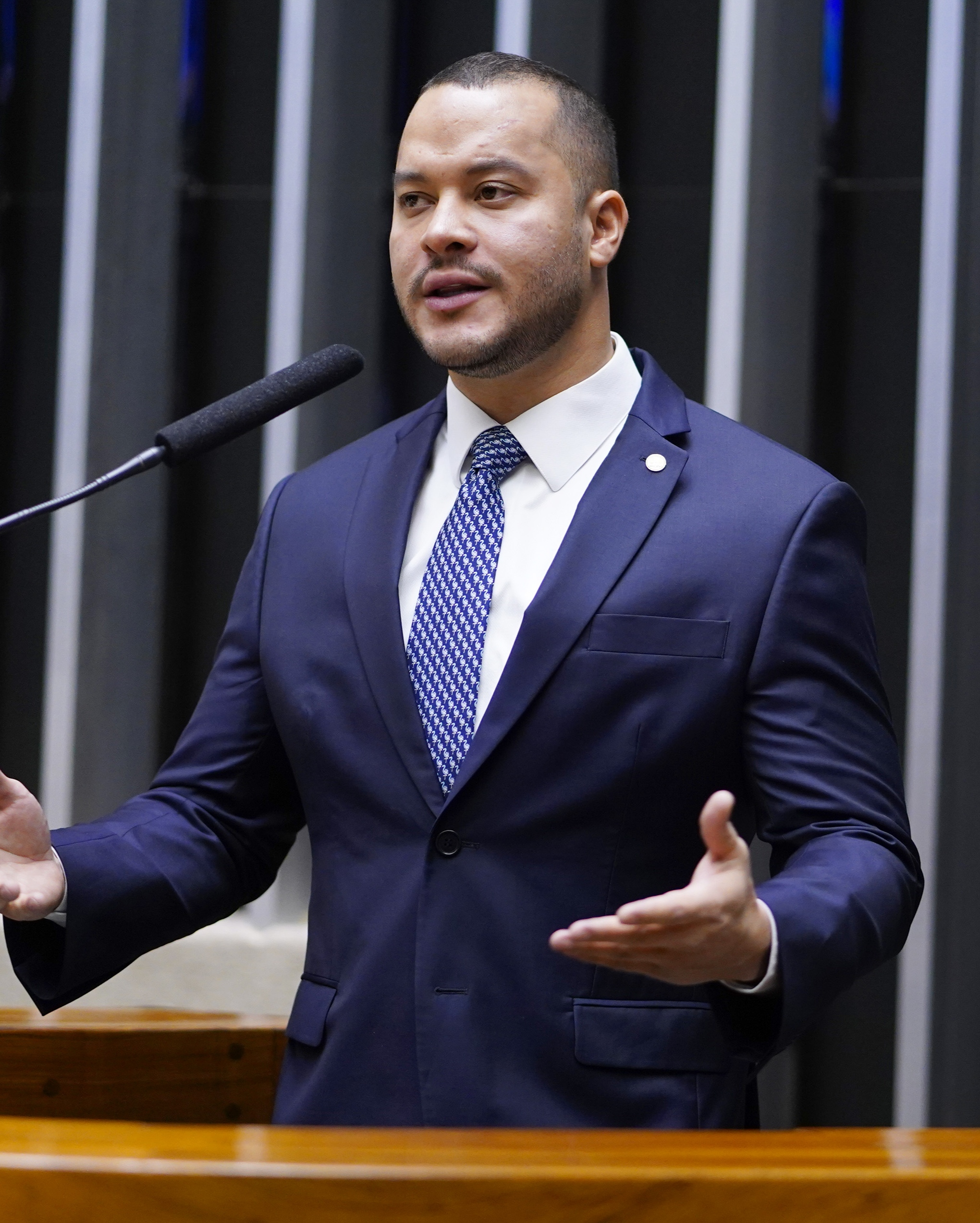

Member of the Chamber of Deputies
- Incumbent
- Assumed office 1 February 2023
- Constituency: Amazonas

Personal details
- Born: 16 February 1992 (age 34)
- Party: MDB (since 2026)
- Parent: Adail Pinheiro (father)
- Relatives: Mayara Pinheiro (sister)

Adail José Figueiredo Pinheiro, better known as Adail Filho (born 16 February 1992), is a Brazilian politician serving as a member of the Chamber of Deputies since 2023. From 2017 to 2020, he served as mayor of Coari. He is the son of Adail Pinheiro and the brother of Mayara Pinheiro.
