= List of mayors of Manaus =

The following is a list of mayors of the city of Manaus, in Amazonas state, Brazil.

== List ==
- Leovigildo Coelho, 1890
- José Carlos da Silva Telles, 1890-1891
- Antônio Clemente Ribeiro Bittencourt, 1891
- Leonardo Antônio Malcher, 1891
- Raimundo Pinto Brandão, 1891-1892
- Manoel Antônio Grangeiro, 1892-1893
- Manoel Uchôa Rodrigues, 1893-1895
- Raimundo Affonso de Carvalho, 1895-1897
- Justiniano Serpa, 1897-1898
- Hildebrando Luiz Antony, 1898-1899
- Joaquim de Souza Ramos, 1899
- Arthur Cesar Moreira de Araújo, 1899-1902
- Adolpho Guilherme de Miranda Lisboa, 1902
- João Coelho de Miranda Leão, 1902
- Martinho de Luna Alencar, 1902-1903
- Adolpho Guilherme de Miranda Lisboa, 1903-1904
- João Coelho de Miranda Leão, 1904
- Adolpho Guilherme de Miranda Lisboa, 1904-1907
- José da Costa Monteiro Tapajós, 1907
- Adolpho Delcidio do Amaral, 1907-1908
- Domingos José de Andrade, 1908-1909
- Agnello Bittencourt, 1909-1910
- Adrião Ribeiro Nepomuceno, 1910-11
- Carlos Guilherme Gordon Studart, 1910
- Jorge de Morais, 1911-1914
- Henrique Ferreira Penna de Azevedo, 1914
- Dorval Pires Porto, 1914-1917
- Antônio Ayres de Almeida Freitas, 1917-1920
- Basílio Torreão Franco de Sá, 1920-1923
- Vivaldo Lima, 1923
- Edgard de Rezende do Rego Monteiro, 1923-1924
- Francisco das Chagas Aguiar, 1924
- José Francisco de Araújo Lima, 1924
- Gentil Augusto Bittencourt, 1924-1925
- Hugo Carneiro, 1925-1926
- José Francisco de Araújo Lima, 1926-1929
- Sérgio Rodrigues Pessoa, 1929-1930
- Joaquim Tanajura, 1930
- Marciano Armond, 1930-1931
- Emanuel de Moraes, 1931-1932
- Luiz Caetano de Oliveira Cabral, 1932-1933
- Alexandre de Carvalho Leal, 1933
- Sócrates Bomfim, 1933-1934
- Pedro Severiano Nunes, 1934-1935
- Alfredo de Lima Castro, 1935-1936
- Jessé de Moura Pinto, 1936
- Antônio Botelho Maia, 1936-1941
- Adhmar de Andrade Thury, 1941-1942
- Paulo de la Cruce de Grana Marinho, 1942-1943
- Antóvila Mourão Vieira, 1943-1945
- Francisco do Couto Vale, 1945
- Jayme Bitancourt de Araújo, 1945-1946
- Arnoldo Carpinteiro Péres, 1946
- José Frazão Ribeiro, 1946-1947
- Raymundo Chaves Ribeiro, 1947-1951
- Walter Scott da Silva Rayol, 1951
- Edson Epaminondas de Mello, 1951-1952
- Álvaro Symphronio Bandeira de Mello, 1952
- Jessé de Moura Pinto, 1952
- Oscar da Costa Rayol, 1952-1953
- Aluízio Marques Brasil, 1953-1955
- Raymundo Coqueiro Mendes, 1955
- Walter Scott da Silva Rayol, 1955
- Stenio Neves, 1955-1956
- Gilberto Mestrinho, 1956-1958
- Eurythis Pinto de Souza, 1958, 1959
- Ismael Benigno, 1958-1959
- Lóris Valdetaro Cordovil, 1959
- Walter Scott da Silva Rayol, 1959
- Olavo das Neves de Oliveira Melo, 1959-1960
- Plínio Ramos Coelho, 1960
- Walter Scott da Silva Rayol, 1960-1961
- Lóris Valdetaro Cordovil, 1961-1962
- Josué Cláudio de Souza, 1962-1964
- João Zany dos Reis, 1964-1965
- Vinicius Monte Conrado Gomes, 1965
- Paulo Pinto Nery, 1965-1972
- Frank Abrahim Lima, 1972-1975
- Jorge Teixeira de Oliveira, 1975-1979
- José Fernandes, 1979-1982
- João de Mendonça Furtado, 1982-1983
- Amazonino Mendes, 1983-1986
- Manoel Henriques Ribeiro, 1986-1988, 1988-1989
- Alfredo Nascimento, 1988
- Arthur Virgílio Neto, 1989-1993
- Amazonino Mendes, 1993-1994
- Eduardo Braga, 1994-1997
- Alfredo Nascimento, 1997-2004
- Luís Alberto Carijó, 2004-2005
- Serafim Corrêa, 2005-2009
- Amazonino Mendes, 2009-2013
- Arthur Virgílio Neto, 2013-2020
- David Almeida, 2021-

== See also ==
- List of aldermen of Manaus
- Câmara Municipal de Manaus (city council)
- Timeline of Manaus
- Amazonas history (state)
- List of mayors of largest cities in Brazil (in Portuguese)
- List of mayors of capitals of Brazil (in Portuguese)
