= Wilson Lima =

Brazilian politician and journalist (born 1976)

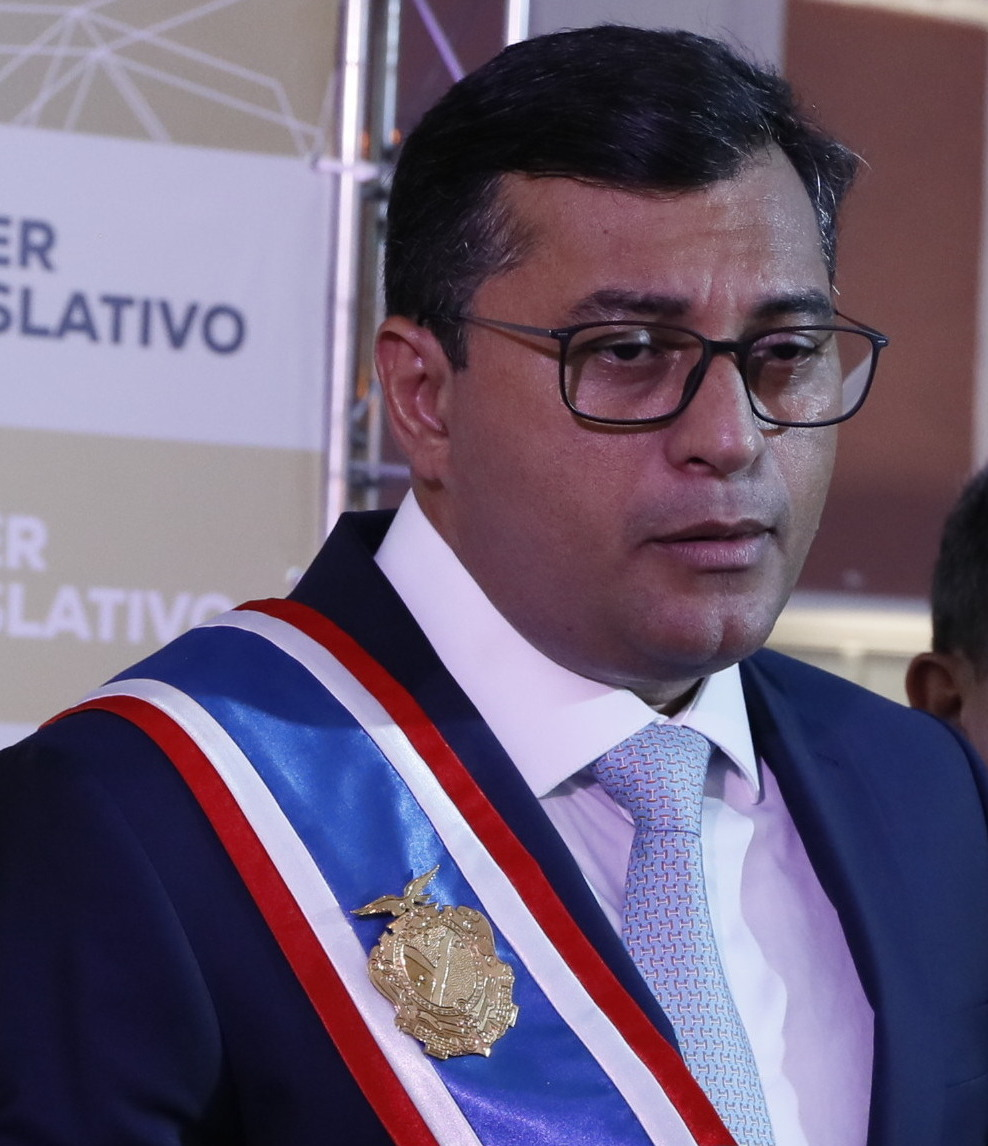

Governor of Amazonas
- Incumbent
- Assumed office 1 January 2019
- Vice Governor: Carlos Almeida (2019–2023); Tadeu de Souza (2023–present)
- Preceded by: Amazonino Mendes

Personal details
- Born: Wilson Miranda Lima; 26 June 1976 (age 50) Santarém, Pará, Brazil
- Party: UNIÃO (2022–present)
- Other political affiliations: PV (2013–2016); PR (2016–2018); PSC (2018–2022)
- Profession: Journalist and radio host

Wilson Miranda Lima (born 26 June 1976) is a Brazilian politician, journalist and the Governor of the state of Amazonas. Lima won the 2018 election with 58% of the vote, defeating PDT incumbent Amazonino Mendes. A member of PSC, Lima assumed office on 1 January 2019.

He was reelected in 2022 for another 4 years term for the Brazil Union (UNIÃO BRASIL) party .

Political offices
Preceded by Amazonino Mendes	Governor of Amazonas; 2019–present	Incumbent
