= Euclides Scalco =

Brazilian politician (1932–2021)

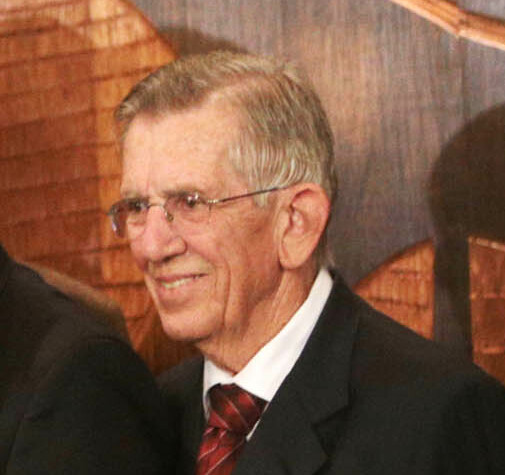
Salco

Euclides Scalco (16 September 1932 – 16 March 2021) was a Brazilian politician who also co-founded the Brazilian Social Democracy Party.

He served as a member of the Chamber of Deputies from 1979-1991 for Paraná.

Scalco died from COVID-19 on 16 March 2021 in Curitiba during the COVID-19 pandemic in Brazil.
