= Marcelo Ramos (politician) =

Brazilian politician (born 1973)

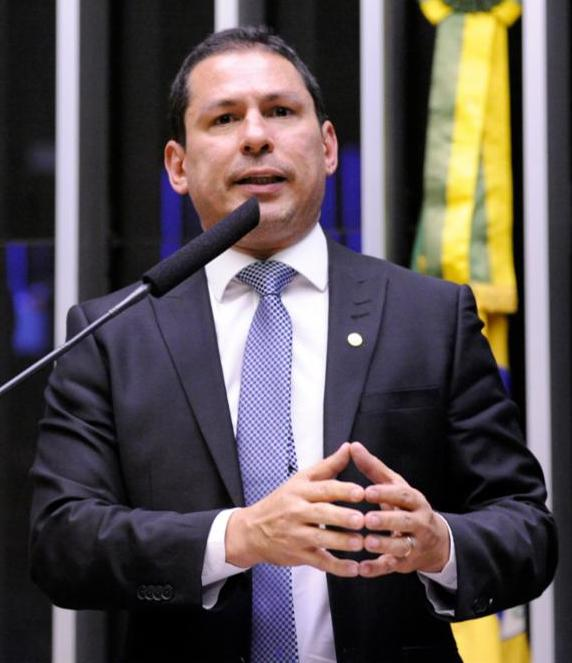
- Ramos in 2019

Member of the Chamber of Deputies
- In office 1 February 2019 – 31 January 2023
- Constituency: Amazonas

Personal details
- Born: 29 August 1973 (age 52)
- Party: Workers' Party (since 2024)

Marcelo Ramos Rodrigues (born 29 August 1973) is a Brazilian politician. From 2019 to 2023, he was a member of the Chamber of Deputies. From 2011 to 2015, he was a member of the Legislative Assembly of Amazonas.
