= List of governors of Amazonas =

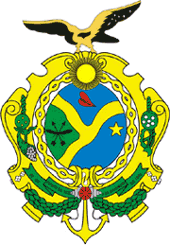
Coat of arms of the Brazilian state of Amazonas

This is a list of governors of the Brazilian state of Amazonas.

== Imperial period ==
Presidents of the Province

#	Name	Start of term	End of term
1	João Batista Figueiredo Tenreiro Aranha	1 January 1852	22 April 1853
2	Herculano Ferreira Pena	22 April 1853	28 April 1856
3	João Pedro Dias Vieira	28 April 1856	12 March 1857
4	Ângelo Tomás do Amaral	12 March 1857	10 November 1857
5	Francisco José Furtado	10 November 1857	24 November 1860
6	Manuel Clementino Carneiro da Cunha	24 November 1860	7 February 1863
7	Sinval Odorico de Moura	7 February 1863	7 April 1864
8	Adolfo de Barros Cavalcanti de Albuquerque Lacerda	7 April 1864	24 August 1865
9	Antônio Epaminondas de Melo	24 August 1865	24 November 1867
10	José Coelho da Gama e Abreu	24 November 1867	9 February 1868
11	Jacinto Pereira do Rego	9 February 1868	26 November 1868
12	João Wilkens de Matos	26 November 1868	8 August 1870
13	José de Miranda da Silva Reis	8 June 1870	8 July 1872
14	Domingos Monteiro Peixoto	8 July 1872	7 August 1875
15	Antônio dos Passos Miranda	7 August 1875	26 July 1876
16	Domingos Jaci Monteiro	26 July 1876	26 May 1877
17	Agesilão Pereira da Silva	26 May 1877	7 March 1878
18	Rufino Enéias Gustavo Galvão	7 March 1878	15 November 1879
19	José Clarindo de Queirós	15 November 1879	26 June 1880
20	Satiro de Oliveira Dias	26 June 1880	16 May 1881
21	Alarico José Furtado	16 May 1881	17 March 1882
22	José Lustosa da Cunha Paranaguá	17 March 1882	11 March 1884
23	Teodureto Carlos de Faria Souto	11 March 1884	11 May 1884
24	José Jansen Ferreira Júnior	11 May 1884	27 May 1885
25	Ernesto Adolfo de Vasconcelos Chaves	27 May 1885	23 March 1887
26	Conrado Jacó de Niemeyer	23 March 1887	10 January 1888
27	Francisco Antônio Pimenta Bueno	10 January 1888	12 July 1888
28	Joaquim Cardoso de Andrade	12 July 1888	12 February 1889
29	Joaquim de Oliveira Machado	12 February 1889	1 July 1889
30	Rufino Enéias Gustavo Galvão	1 July 1889	21 November 1889

== Republic period ==
Governors of the state of Amazonas

nº	Name	Start of term	End of term
1	Junta governativa amazonense de 1889	21 November 1889	4 January 1890
2	Augusto Ximeno de Villeroy	4 January 1890	2 November 1890
3	Eduardo Gonçalves Ribeiro	2 November 1890	5 May 1891
—	Guilherme José Moreira	5 May 1891	25 May 1891
4	Antônio Gomes Pimentel	25 May 1891	30 June 1891
5	Guilherme José Moreira	30 June 1891	1 September 1891
6	Gregório Taumaturgo Azevedo	1 September 1891	27 February 1892
—	José Inácio Borges Machado	27 February 1892	27 February 1892
7	Eduardo Gonçalves Ribeiro	27 February 1892	23 July 1896
8	Fileto Pires Ferreira	23 July 1896	4 April 1898
9	José Cardoso Ramalho Júnior	4 April 1898	23 July 1900
10	Silvério José Néri	23 July 1900	23 July 1904
11	Antônio Constantino Néri	23 July 1904	23 July 1908
12	Antônio Clemente Ribeiro Bittencourt	23 July 1908	1 January 1913
13	Jônatas de Freitas Pedrosa	1 January 1913	1 January 1917
14	Pedro de Alcântara Bacelar	1 January 1917	1 January 1921
15	César do Rego Monteiro	1 January 1921	30 October 1924
16	Raimundo Rodrigues Barbosa	30 October 1924	2 December 1924
17	Alfredo Sá	2 December 1924	1 January 1926
18	Ifigênio Ferreira de Sales	1 January 1926	1 January 1930
19	Dorval Pires Porto	1 January 1930	24 October 1930
—	Junta governativa amazonense de 1889	24 October 1930	1 November 1930
—	Floriano da Silva Machado	1 November 1930	20 November 1930
20	Álvaro Botelho Maia	20 November 1930	10 October 1933
21	Nélson de Melo	10 October 1933	19 February 1935
22	Álvaro Botelho Maia	19 February 1935	7 November 1945
23	Emiliano Estanislau Afonso	7 November 1945	16 February 1946
24	Júlio José da Silva Néri	16 February 1946	18 May 1946
25	Raimundo Nicolau da Silva	18 May 1946	31 August 1946
—	João Nogueira da Mata	31 August 1946	13 September 1946
26	Siseno Sarmento	13 September 1946	1 March 1947
27	João Nogueira da Mata	1 March 1947	8 May 1947
28	Leopoldo da Silva Amorim Neves	8 May 1947	31 January 1951
30	Álvaro Botelho Maia	31 January 1951	25 March 1955
31	Plínio Ramos Coelho	25 March 1955	25 March 1959
32	Gilberto Mestrinho	25 March 1959	25 March 1963
33	Plínio Ramos Coelho	25 March 1963	27 June 1964
34	Artur César Ferreira Reis	27 June 1964	12 September 1966
35	Danilo Duarte de Matos Areosa	12 September 1966	15 March 1971
36	João Walter de Andrade	15 March 1971	15 March 1975
37	Henoch da Silva Reis	15 March 1975	15 March 1979
38	José Bernardino Lindoso	15 March 1979	15 May 1982
39	Paulo Pinto Nery	15 May 1982	15 March 1983
40	Gilberto Mestrinho	15 March 1983	15 March 1987
41	Amazonino Mendes	15 March 1987	2 April 1990
42	Vivaldo Barroso Frota	2 April 1990	15 March 1991
43	Gilberto Mestrinho	15 March 1991	1 January 1995
44	Amazonino Mendes	1 January 1995	1 January 2003
45	Eduardo Braga	1 January 2003	31 March 2010
46	Omar Aziz	31 March 2010	4 April 2014
47	José Melo	4 April 2014	9 May 2017
—	David Almeida	9 May 2017	4 October 2017
48	Amazonino Mendes	4 October 2017	1 January 2019
49	Wilson Lima	1 January 2019	present
