= Amazonino Mendes =

Brazilian politician (1939–2023)

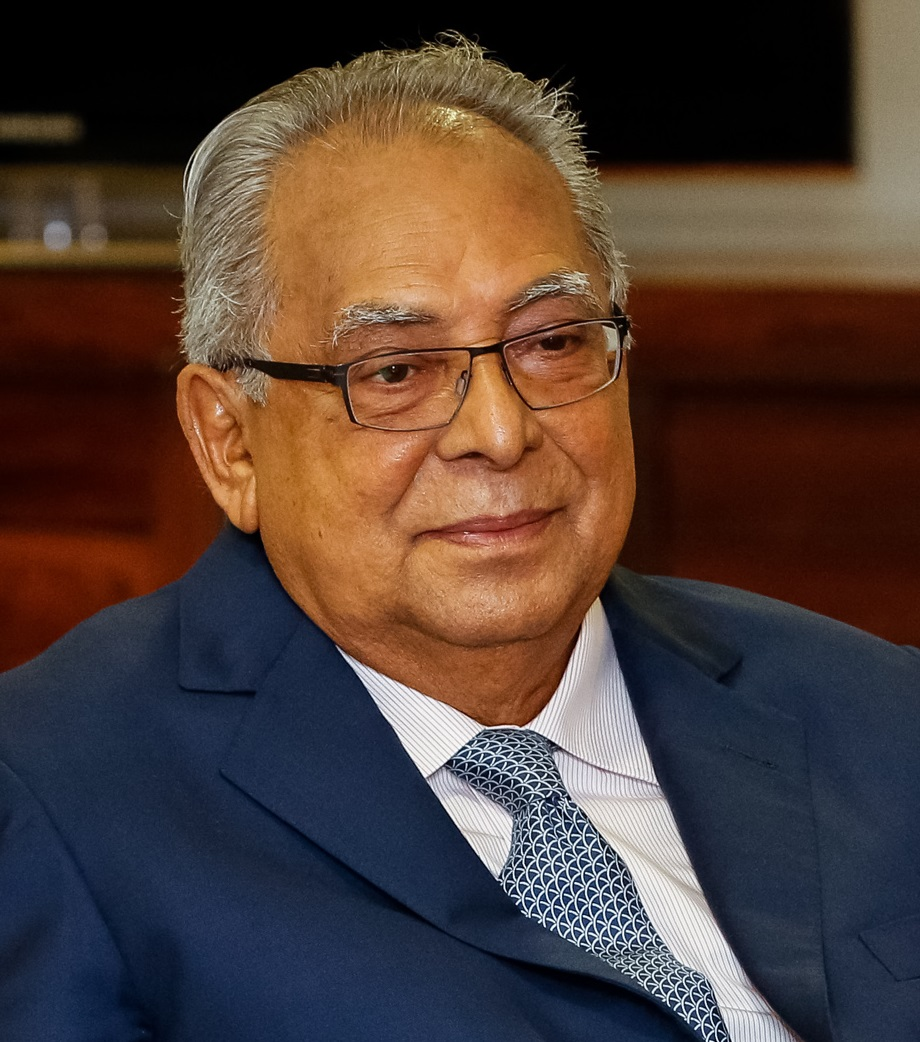

Governor of Amazonas
- In office 4 October 2017 – 1 January 2019
- Preceded by: David Almeida
- Succeeded by: Wilson Lima
- In office 1 January 1995 – 1 January 2003
- Preceded by: Gilberto Mestrinho
- Succeeded by: Eduardo Braga
- In office 15 March 1987 – 2 April 1990
- Preceded by: Gilberto Mestrinho
- Succeeded by: Vivaldo Frota

Mayor of Manaus
- In office 1 January 2009 – 1 January 2013
- Preceded by: Serafim Corrêa
- Succeeded by: Arthur Virgílio Neto
- In office 1 January 1993 – 2 April 1994
- Preceded by: Arthur Virgílio Neto
- Succeeded by: Eduardo Braga
- In office 28 March 1983 – 1 January 1986
- Preceded by: João de Mendonça Furtado
- Succeeded by: Manoel Henriques Ribeiro

Senator for Amazonas
- In office 1 February 1991 – 1 January 1993

Personal details
- Born: Amazonino Armando Mendes; 16 November 1939; Eirunepé, Amazonas, Brazil
- Died: 12 February 2023 (aged 83); São Paulo, Brazil
- Political party: See list: PMDB (1980–1988); PSDB (1988–1990); PDC (1990–1993); PPR (1993–1995); PPB (1995–1996); PFL (1996–2007); PTB (2007–2011); PDT (2011–2019); PODE (2020–2021); Cidadania (2022–2023)
- Profession: Lawyer and businessman

Amazonino Armando Mendes (16 November 1939 – 12 February 2023) was a Brazilian politician. He had served as the Governor of the Brazilian state of Amazonas for three non-consecutive tenures.

Mendes was born in Eirunepé, Amazonas. He first served as governor from 1987 until 2 April 1990, when he resigned from office to run for the Federal Senate. He was elected governor in 1995, serving from 1995 until 2003. In 2017, Mendes was elected Governor of Amazonas succeeding David Almeida, who assumed office as interim governor following the Superior Electoral Court impeachment of former Governor José Melo and former Vice Governor Henrique Oliveira. As a result, the president of the Legislative Assembly of Amazonas State assumed office until the elections were held on the 6 and 27 August.

Mendes died from pneumonia on 12 February 2023, at the age of 83.

== See also ==
- List of mayors of Manaus

Political offices
| Preceded by João de Mendonça Furtado | Mayor of Manaus; 1983–1986 | Succeeded by Manoel Henriques Ribeiro |
| Preceded by Arthur Virgílio Neto | Mayor of Manaus; 1993–1994 | Succeeded by Eduardo Braga |
| Preceded by Serafim Corrêa | Mayor of Manaus; 2009–2013 | Succeeded by Arthur Virgílio Neto |
| Preceded by Gilberto Mestrinho | Governor of Amazonas; 1987–1990 | Succeeded by Vivaldo Frota |
| Preceded by Gilberto Mestrinho | Governor of Amazonas; 1995–2003 | Succeeded by Eduardo Braga |
| Preceded by David Almeida | Governor of Amazonas; 2017–2019 | Succeeded by Wilson Lima |
