= Gilberto Mestrinho =

Brazilian politician

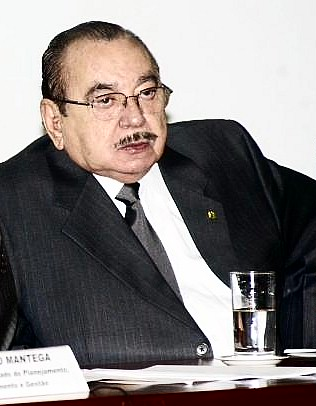
- Mestrinho in 2003

32nd, 40th, 43rd Governor of Amazonas
- In office March 15, 1991 – January 1, 1995
- Preceded by: Vivaldo Frota
- Succeeded by: Amazonino Mendes
- In office March 15, 1983 – March 15, 1987
- Preceded by: Paulo Pinto Nery
- Succeeded by: Amazonino Mendes
- In office March 25, 1959 – March 25, 1963
- Preceded by: Plínio Ramos Coelho
- Succeeded by: Plínio Ramos Coelho

Personal details
- Born: February 23, 1928 Manaus, Amazonas
- Died: July 19, 2009 (aged 81) Manaus, Amazonas
- Party: Brazilian Democratic Movement Party

Gilberto Mestrinho de Medeiros Raposo (February 23, 1928 – July 19, 2009) was a Brazilian politician. Mestrinho served as the Governor of the state of Amazonas on three occasions. His first term as Governor was from 1959 until 1963. His second term in office lasted from 1983 to 1987, while his third term as Governor of Amazonas extended from 1991 until 1995.

Mestrinho also served as the mayor of Manaus from 1956 until 1958 and a Senator in the Brazilian Senate during his political career.

Gilberto Mestrinho was married to Maria Emília Mestrinho and had nine children. He died of lung cancer at the Hospital Prontocord in Manaus, Brazil, on July 19, 2009, at the age of 81. He had been hospitalized for the preceding 15 days due to his deteriorating health.

== See also ==
- List of mayors of Manaus

Political offices
| Preceded by Vivaldo Frota | Governor of Amazonas; 1991–1995 | Succeeded by Amazonino Mendes |
| Preceded by Paulo Pinto Nery | Governor of Amazonas; 1983–1987 | Succeeded by Amazonino Mendes |
| Preceded by Plínio Ramos Coelho | Governor of Amazonas; 1959–1963 | Succeeded by Plínio Ramos Coelho |
