= Manoel Henriques Ribeiro =

Brazilian politician (1945–2022)

Deputy Governor of Amazonas
- In office 1983–1985
- Preceded by: Átila Lins
- Succeeded by: Alfredo Nascimento

Mayor of Manaus
- In office 1986 – 7 July 1988
- Preceded by: Alfredo Nascimento
- Succeeded by: Arthur Virgílio Neto

Personal details
- Born: 15 May 1945; Manaus, Brazil
- Died: 18 January 2022 (aged 76); Manaus, Brazil

Manoel Henriques Ribeiro (15 May 1945 – 18 January 2022) was a Brazilian politician.

He served as Deputy Governor of Amazonas from 1983 to 1985 and was Mayor of Manaus from 1986 to 1988. He died on 18 January 2022, at the age of 76.
