= Diário do Amazonas =

Brazilian newspaper

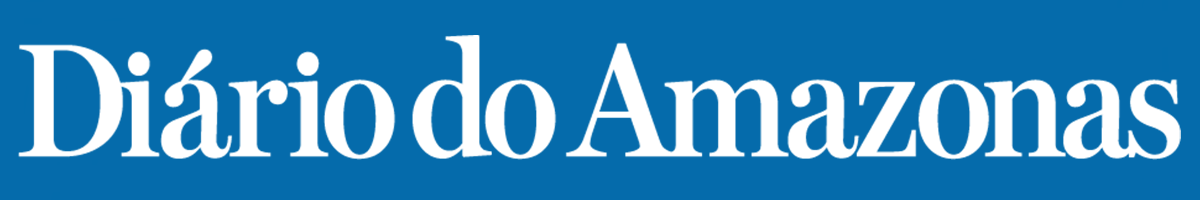
- Type: Daily newspaper
- Format: Berliner
- Founder: Cassiano Cirilo Anunciação
- Editor: Ana Cassia
- Founded: 15 March 1985
- Language: Portuguese
- Headquarters: Manaus, Amazonas
- Country: Brazil
- Website: Official website

Diário do Amazonas is a Brazilian daily newspaper founded in 1985 in the city of Manaus, the capital of the state of Amazonas, Brazil.

It belongs to the Rede Diário de Comunicação (Daily Communication Network), which also publishes the paper Dez Minutos (English: Ten Minutes), an abbreviated version of the Diário do Amazonas which is sold for 50 reais and is marketed towards people of lower classes. It is also part of a group which includes Rádio Diário and TV Diário, affiliated with Record News in Manaus.

It is one of the largest newspapers by circulation in the state.
