= José Melo de Oliveira =

Brazilian politician

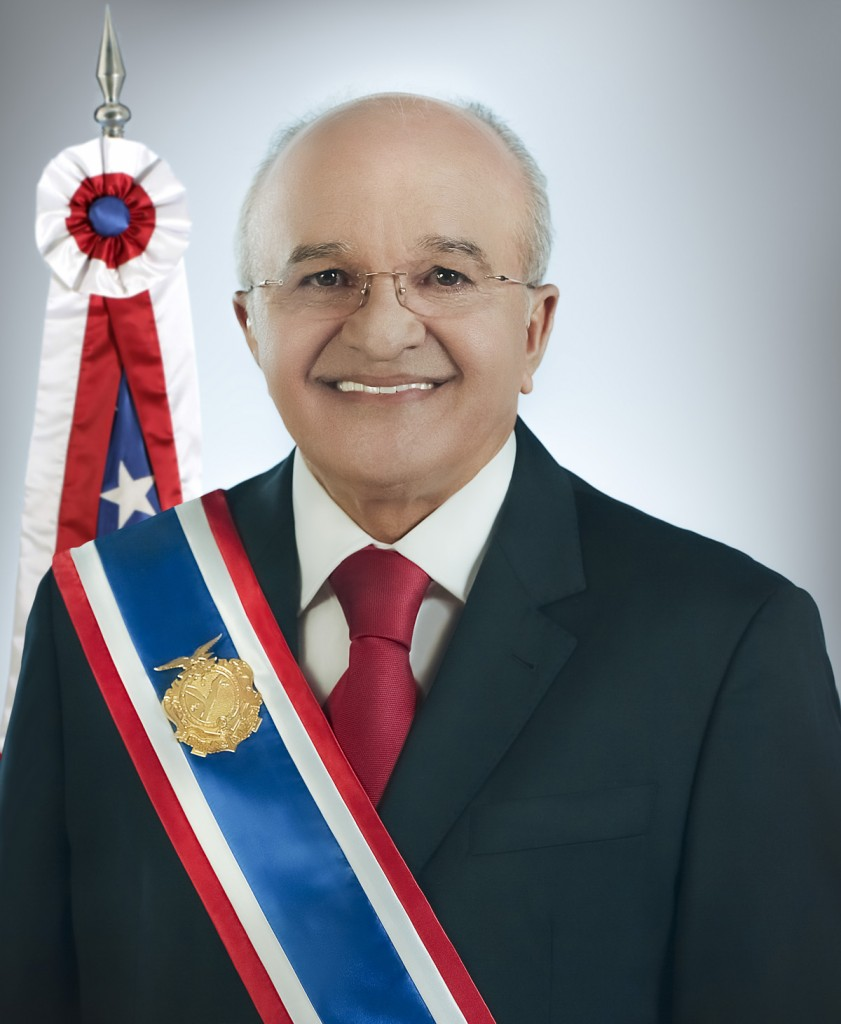

47th Governor of Amazonas
- In office April 4, 2014 – May 9, 2017
- Vice Governor: Henrique Oliveira
- Preceded by: Omar Aziz
- Succeeded by: David Almeida; May 9, 2017 – Oct 4, 2017 (provisional); Amazonino Mendes

Vice Governor of Amazonas
- In office March 31, 2010 – April 4, 2014
- Governor: Omar Aziz
- Preceded by: Omar Aziz
- Succeeded by: Henrique Oliveira

Personal details
- Born: September 26, 1946 (age 80) Ipixuna, Amazonas, Brazil
- Party: PODE

José Melo de Oliveira (born September 26, 1946) is a Brazilian politician and was governor of state of Amazonas, Brazil.

Melo graduated with a degree in economics from the Federal University of Amazonas in 1967. He began public life while still at the university, where he served in various roles, including as a typist, director of the Department of Education and Sports, Subrector for Academic Affairs, and as a member of the University Council. Later, he worked as a teacher of history at Estelita Tapajós High School in Manaus. He also taught at the former Federal Technical School of Amazonas, and was a professor at the Federal University of Amazonas between 1970 and 1984. He won the election for Governor of the state of Amazonas in 2014 as a member of the Republican Party of the Social Order. His predecessor in the role, Omar Aziz, instead ran for a position in the Senate in the 2014 general elections.

Political offices
| Preceded by Omar Aziz | Governor of Amazonas; 2014–2017 | Succeeded by David Almeida (interim) |
