= Federal University of Amazonas =

Public university in Manaus, Amazonas, Brazil

- Universidade Federal do Amazonas
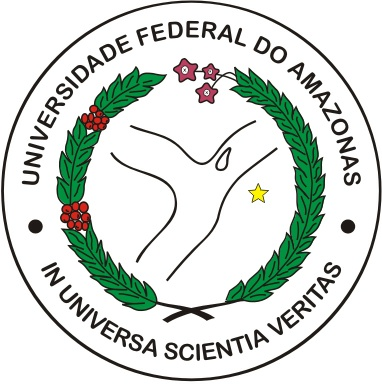
- Other names: UFAM
- Motto: In universa scientia Veritas
- Motto in English: "Science as universal truth."
- Type: Public university
- Established: 17 January 1909
- Affiliations: Andifes
- Endowment: R$ 645.000.000 (2017)
- Rector: Prof. Sylvio Mário Puga Ferreira, Ph. D.
- Academic staff: 766
- Location: Manaus, Amazonas, Brazil
- Campus: Suburban
- Website: ufam.edu.br

The Federal University of Amazonas (Portuguese: Universidade Federal do Amazonas, UFAM) is a public university located in Manaus, Amazonas, Brazil. It is one of the largest universities in the northern region of Brazil.

It offers a wide array of degrees, with 645 research groups and 65 graduate courses.

== History ==
The UFAM is the oldest university in Brazil. It was founded on January 17, 1909 as the Free University School of Manáos, born of the same late-19th century economic boom that gave Manaus its rubber barons. The school later becoming the University of Manáos. The economic downturn that followed the collapse of the rubber market, as well as the logistical problems of being located in the Amazon rainforest, led the school to curtail its academic offerings down to just a law program. On June 12, 1962, Brazilian federal law 4.069-A under the authorship of Senator Arthur Virgílio Jr. reinvigorated the school as the state-owned University of Amazonas. In June 2002, the school was renamed the Federal University of Amazonas.

As of 2023, Professor Dr. Sylvio Puga, from the Faculty of Social Studies, serves as Rector. Famous former students include Eduardo Braga (former governor of Amazonas).

== Undergraduate programs ==
Currently the Federal University of Amazonas is composed of six campuses, holders of different academic calendars. While on the campus of Manaus, the school year begins in the first semester (with the exception of the Physiotherapy course and the SiSU approved group for the Medicine course, which starts in the second semester), in the campus of the interior of the state, the school year begins in the second semester. The following is a list of the campuses and their respective courses offered:

=== Manaus Campus ===
==== Agricultural sciences ====
- Agronomy
- Forestry Engineering
- Food Engineering
- Fisheries Engineering
- Animal Husbandry

==== Biological Sciences ====
- Nursing
- Pharmacy
- Physical Education
- Physical Education (Promotion in Health and Leisure)
- Physical Education (Sports Training and Physiotherapy)
- Medicine
- Dentistry
- Biotechnology
- Biological Sciences
- Natural Sciences

==== Exact Sciences ====
- Architecture and Urban Design
- Civil Engineering
- Computer Engineering
- Electrical Engineering - Electronics
- Electrical Engineering - Electrical Engineering
- Electrical Engineering - Telecommunications
- Production Engineering
- Materials Engineering
- Mechanical Engineering
- Petroleum Engineering and Gas
- Chemical Engineering
- Statistics
- Physics
- Geology
- Mathematics
- Applied Mathematics
- Chemistry
- Computer Science
- Software Engineering

==== Humanities ====
- Law
- Pedagogy
- Administration
- Accounting
- Economic Sciences
- Psychology
- Social Sciences
- Philosophy
- Geography
- History
- Social Service
- Archivology
- Librarianship
- Social Communication - Public Relations and Journalism
- Liberal Arts in Spanish Language and Literature
- Liberal Arts in French Language and Literature
- Liberal Arts in English Language and Literature
- Liberal Arts in Japanese Language and Literature
- Liberal Arts in Portuguese Language and Literature
- Liberal Arts in BSL (Brazilian Signal Language, LIBRAS)
- Plastic Arts
- Music

=== Benjamin Constant Campus ===
Located in Benjamin Constant, city of Alto Solimões. Benjamin Constant's Multicampi offers undergraduate courses: Bachelor of Administration, Bachelor of Anthropology, Bachelor of Science in Agrarian Sciences and Environment, Bachelor of Arts in Biology and Chemistry, Bachelor of Arts in Spanish Language and Literature, Letters in Portuguese Language and Literature and Bachelor in Pedagogy.

=== Coari Campus ===
Located in Coari. Coari's Multicampi offers the following undergraduate courses: Biotechnology, Bachelor of Science: Biology and Chemistry, Bachelor of Science: Mathematics and Physics, Nursing, Physiotherapy, Medicine and Nutrition.

=== Humaitá Campus ===
Located in Humaitá, in the micro-region of Madeira, is the only one located in the South of Amazonas. The Multicampi of Humaitá offers the following undergraduate courses: Degree in Agronomy, Biology, Chemistry, Mathematics, Physics, Environmental Engineering, Letters - English Language and Literature, Letters - Portuguese Language and Literature and Pedagogy.

=== Itacoatiara Campus ===
Located in Itacoatiara, city of Greater Manaus. Multicampi of Itacoatiara offers the following undergraduate courses: Agronomy, Pharmaceutical Sciences, Biology, Chemistry, Mathematics, Physics, Production Engineering, Software Engineering, Sanitary Engineering, Industrial Chemistry, Information System.

=== Parintins Campus ===
Located in Parintins. Multicampi of Parintins offers the following undergraduate courses: Administration in Organizational Management, Fine Arts, Social Communication - Journalism, Physical Education, Pedagogy, Social Work and Zootechnics.

== International partnerships ==
The University has a partnership with the University of Missouri School of Music in Columbia, Missouri, United States.

== Notable alumni ==
- Eduardo Braga – Brazilian politician
- Wanda Chase – Brazilian journalist
- Elaíze Farias – Brazilian journalist
- Vanessa Grazziotin – Brazilian politician
- José Melo – Brazilian politician and former governor of state of Amazonas
- Larissa Ramos – Brazilian model
- Malvino Salvador – Brazilian actor

== See also ==
- Brazil University Rankings
- List of federal universities of Brazil
- Universities and Higher Education in Brazil
