= Eirunepé =

Municipality of Amazonas, Brazil

- Municipality
- The Municipality of Eirunepe
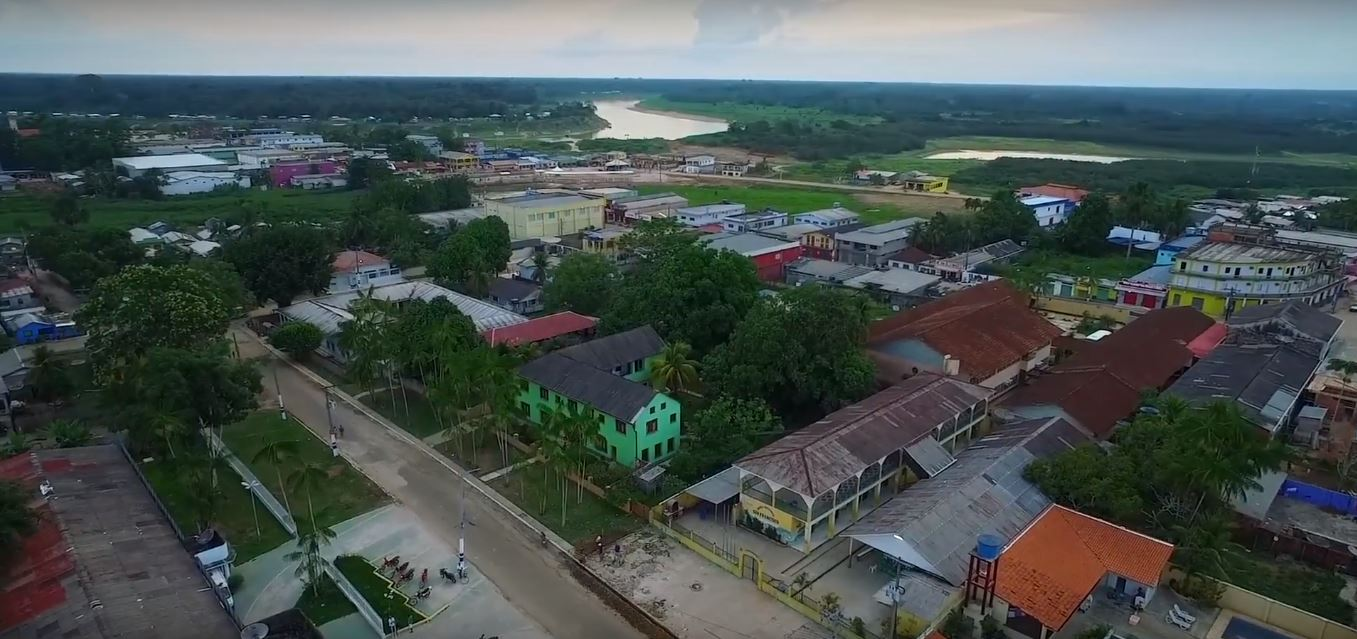
- Eirunepé, Brazil

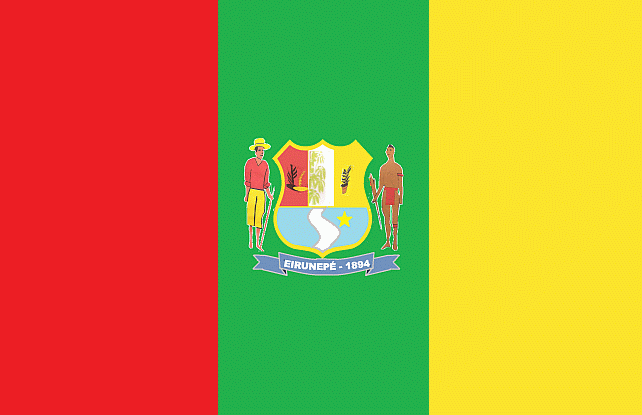
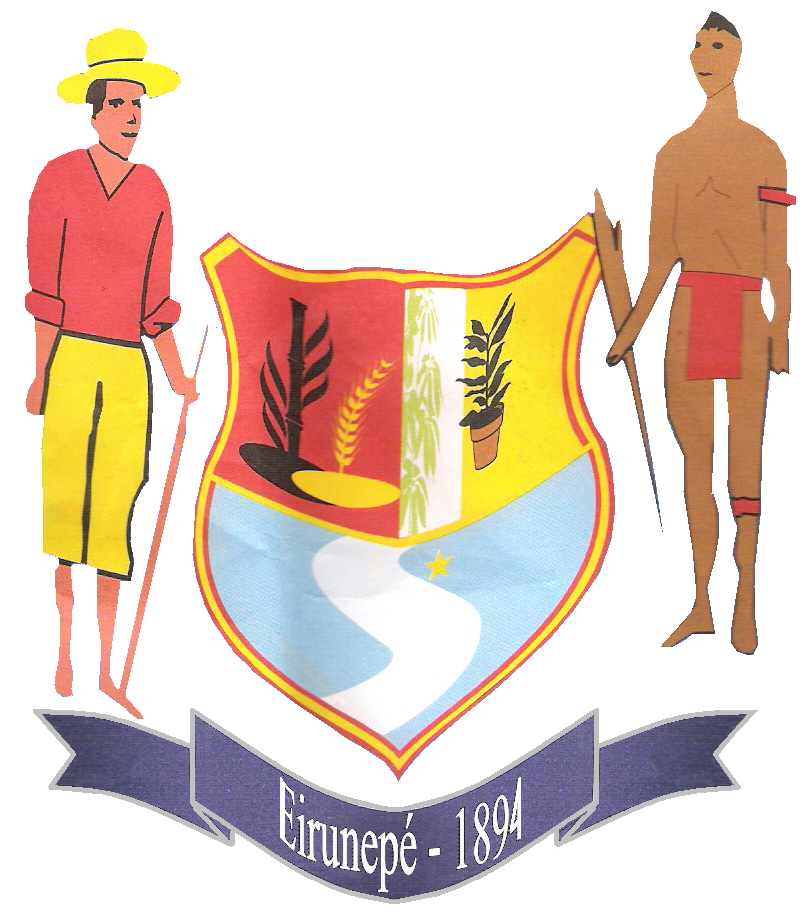
- Flag Coat of arms
- Nickname: "Terra da Fé" ("Land of Faith")
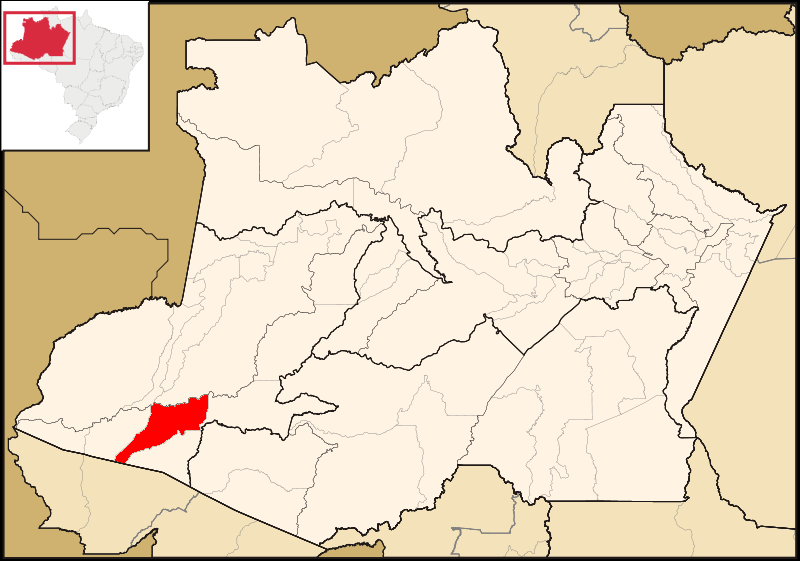

- Location in Brazil
- Coordinates: 06°39′36″S 69°52′26″W
- Country: Brazil
- Region: North
- State: Amazonas
- Founded: 1895

Government
  - Mayor: Dissica Valério (PMDB)

Area
  - Municipality: 16,079 km^{2} (6,208 sq mi)
- Elevation: 508 m (1,667 ft)

Population (2020)
  - Municipality: 35,700
  - Density: 2.22/km^{2} (5.75/sq mi)
  - Metro: 103,308
- Time zone: UTC−5 (ACT)
- Postal Code: 69880-000
- Area code: +55 97
- Website: Eirunepé, Amazonas

Eirunepé is a Brazilian municipality in the southwest part of the state of Amazonas, about 1,150 kilometers a straight line from Manaus and 2,417 kilometers by river, one of the cities furthest from its state capital. It is the fourth largest city in the Southwest region.

== History ==
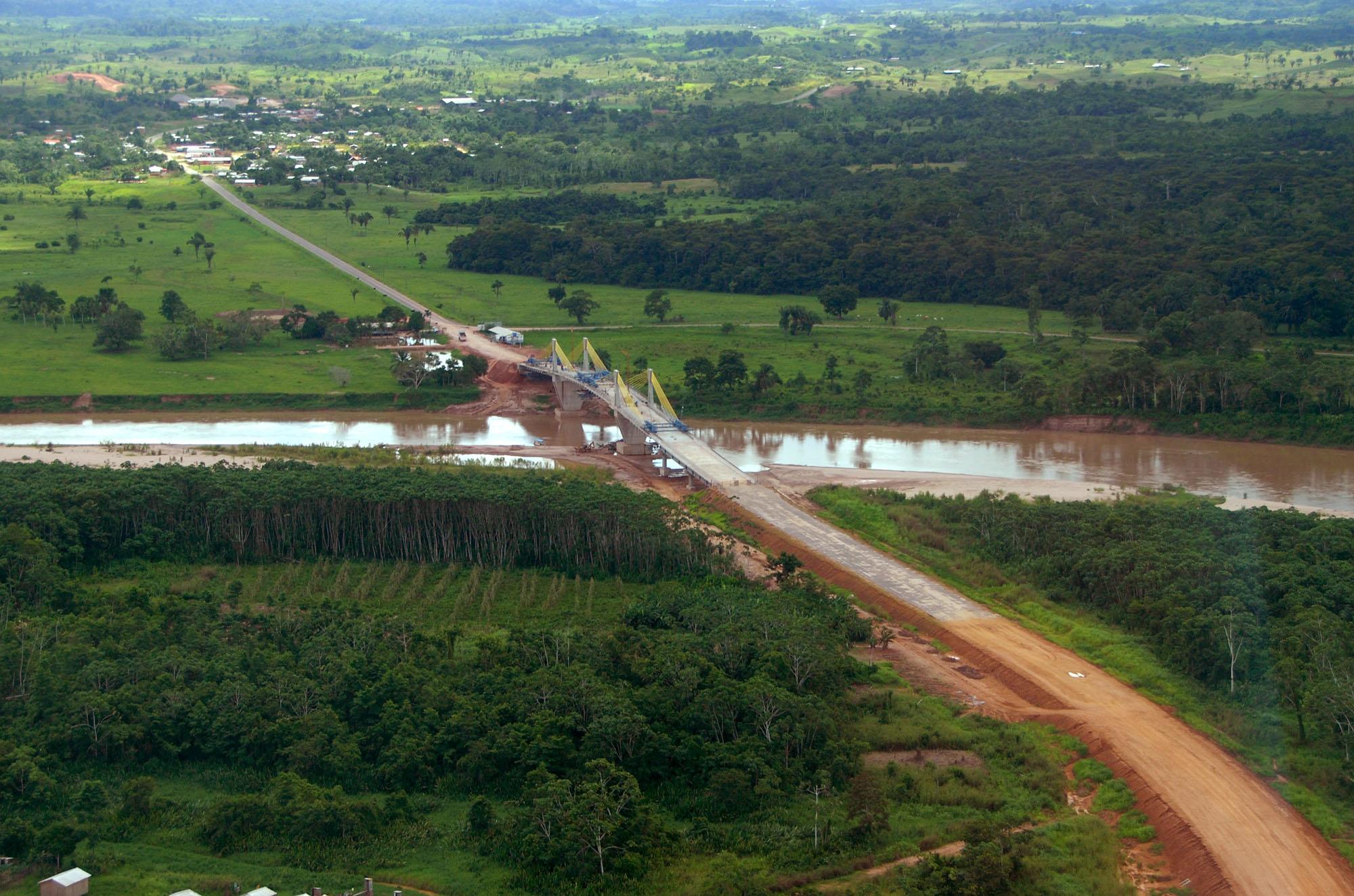
Bridge over the Tarauacá River.

In the last decades of the 19th century, attracted by the extraction of latex, the pinnacle of the economy of the Amazon at the time, and fleeing from the drought in the Brazilian Northeast region, peoples from Ceara, Rio Grande do Norte and Paraíba states, arrived in Juruá and took up residence in the rubber, giving rise to the first villages. It was in this historical context that the settlement began in the city today called Eirunepé.

The first inhabitants were brought by men Northeastern Felipe Manoel da Cunha. As there was a major lack of white women, these men intermarried with indigenous women of the Kulina tribe. This led to many conflicts with the white man arrived, sharing the opinion of the tribe. So those who accepted the white man were named Kulinas, while those who did not accept were named Kanamari.

In the first decades of the twentieth century, during the First World War (1914–1918), many people from various countries fleeing the war, seeking other places to start a new life. Upon arrival in Brazil, many were attracted by the rubber, the main wealth of the time, and sought to engage the interior for agriculture and the cultivation of latex. With the decline of rubber, many families have sought jobs in other cities, mainly Manaus. Others continued living in the field of low recovery of rubber and agriculture. The population to be composed of various mixtures with strong traces of white northeastern Kulinaã with Indians, had also influenced by people from other regions, such as Turkish, Portuguese and others. Hence, there arises a very diverse culture, with habits and customs.

The city of Eirunepe, formerly St. Philip, situated on the left bank of the River Jurua, near the mouth of the Rio Tarauacá, which lies on the opposite bank. The place where it was built, was formerly the headquarters of Eiru large plantation, owned by Felipe Manoel da Cunha, rich seringalista Rio Jurua. The headquarters of Eiru developed considerably by the time the price of rubber has undergone a major recovery. Administrative Training Eiru assumed aspect of the village in a beautiful land on the bank surrounding a beautiful bend of river.

The owner was interested in turning it into town, to call authorities for that distant region. Before long, Philip Manuel da Cunha entered into understanding with the government and managed to be added in Article No. 69 of Law No. 33, November 4, 1892, more than one municipality, which was called the San Felipe River Jurua. This law, however, was not put into execution. Law No. 76, September 8, 1894, in Rio Jurua created a municipality with its Term County Judicial Annex to Tefe, headquartered in San Felipe. Law No. 114 of April 17, 1895, transferred the seat of the municipality, the place of San Felipe for Carauari. Revises the boundaries of the municipalities of the State, by Decree No. 122, August 7, 1896, the seat of the Municipality of Carauari been included in the territory of Tefe, giving result to Decree No. 125 of August 11, 1896, transferring to the town of Carauari for the post of San Felipe.

Automatically, the judge, Jorge Augusto Studart deemed transferred the seat of the district and going to the new location, there installed the district on September 21, 1896. There was no act creating the County of San Felipe. On the same day the first Superintendent Captain Lieutenant Thomas Bridges Medeiros installed Vila, who also had not been created. After the National Revolution (1930), was nominated for Mayor of Capt. Moses Coriolis Araújo, this request to change the name of the village of San Felipe to Joao Pessoa, giving as a result the Act No. 317 of March 5, 1931. Law No. 14, September 6, 1935, the town was elevated to city, having been installed by Mayor Conrado Pinto Joao Gomes. On December 31, 1943, by Decree Law No. 1186 State, city and district headquarters are to be called Eirunepé. On December 19, 1955, by State Law No. 96, are dismembered parts of their territory that they form two new districts, which now are called Envira and Ipixuna.

As per proposal, it is set to be the capital of a proposed state called "Juruá".

== Geography ==
The municipality contains 41.22% of the 427,004-hectare (1,055,150-acre) Rio Gregório Extractive Reserve.

=== Climate ===
The climate is equatorial (Af, according to the Köppen climate classification), with high indices of relative humidity of the air and low thermal amplitudes, being the average temperature compensated of 26 °C (79 °F). The rainfall index is about 2,300 millimeters per year, with a decrease in the quarter from June to August, when the municipality is more subject to "friagem" events, when polar air masses reach the region and lower the temperature, sometimes to values of 15 °C or less. The average sunshine time is approximately 1 350 hours per year.

According to data from the National Institute of Meteorology (INMET), since 1974 the lowest temperature recorded at Eirunepé was 8.5 °C (47.3 °F) on June 1, 1988. The highest reached 39.8 °C (103.6 °F) on October 30, 2015.

=== Climate ===
Climate data for Eirunepé (1991–2020 normals, extremes 1974–present)
Month	Jan	Feb	Mar	Apr	May	Jun	Jul	Aug	Sep	Oct	Nov	Dec	Year
Record high °C (°F)	37.6 (99.7)	37.4 (99.3)	37.5 (99.5)	38.7 (101.7)	38.2 (100.8)	37.0 (98.6)	38.8 (101.8)	38.3 (100.9)	38.6 (101.5)	39.4 (102.9)	38.4 (101.1)	38.0 (100.4)	39.4 (102.9)
Mean daily maximum °C (°F)	32.7 (90.9)	32.7 (90.9)	32.9 (91.2)	32.9 (91.2)	32.3 (90.1)	32.2 (90.0)	32.9 (91.2)	33.9 (93.0)	34.4 (93.9)	34.0 (93.2)	33.6 (92.5)	33.0 (91.4)	33.1 (91.6)
Daily mean °C (°F)	26.2 (79.2)	26.2 (79.2)	26.3 (79.3)	26.3 (79.3)	25.8 (78.4)	25.4 (77.7)	25.3 (77.5)	25.8 (78.4)	26.5 (79.7)	26.6 (79.9)	26.5 (79.7)	26.3 (79.3)	26.1 (79.0)
Mean daily minimum °C (°F)	21.8 (71.2)	21.9 (71.4)	21.9 (71.4)	21.8 (71.2)	21.2 (70.2)	20.4 (68.7)	19.7 (67.5)	20.0 (68.0)	21.1 (70.0)	21.8 (71.2)	22.1 (71.8)	21.9 (71.4)	21.3 (70.3)
Record low °C (°F)	16.0 (60.8)	16.0 (60.8)	15.2 (59.4)	15.0 (59.0)	13.0 (55.4)	8.5 (47.3)	10.2 (50.4)	11.6 (52.9)	11.2 (52.2)	14.2 (57.6)	14.2 (57.6)	12.8 (55.0)	8.5 (47.3)
Average precipitation mm (inches)	325.5 (12.81)	303.8 (11.96)	311.6 (12.27)	279.9 (11.02)	174.1 (6.85)	95.7 (3.77)	63.3 (2.49)	77.4 (3.05)	129.0 (5.08)	198.3 (7.81)	232.0 (9.13)	302.7 (11.92)	2,493.3 (98.16)
Average precipitation days (≥ 1.0 mm)	18	16	18	15	11	8	6	6	9	13	15	17	152
Average relative humidity (%)	86.7	85.4	85.5	85.3	85.3	84.4	82.6	81.2	81.2	83.0	84.7	85.8	84.3
Mean monthly sunshine hours	87.7	75.8	84.2	100.9	114.6	130.5	180.9	172.3	136.4	125.8	106.3	89.3	1,404.7
Source 1: Instituto Nacional de Meteorologia
Source 2: Meteo Climat (record highs and lows)

== Transportation ==
The city is served by Amaury Feitosa Tomaz Airport.
