= Alfredo Nascimento (politician) =

Brazilian politician (born 1952)

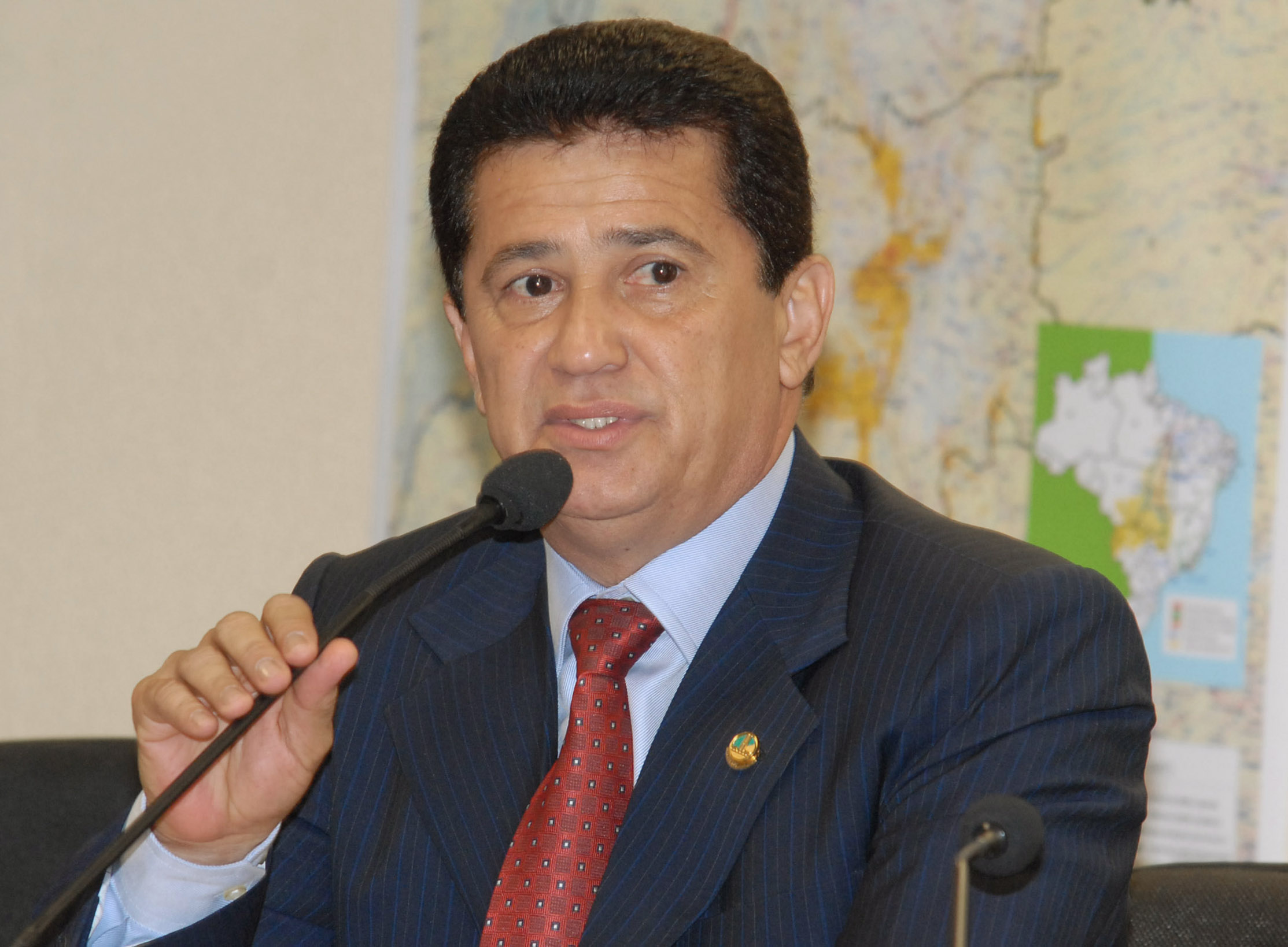

Federal Deputy
- In office February 1, 2015 – February 1, 2019
- Constituency: Amazonas

Minister of Transport
- In office March 15, 2004 – July 6, 2011
- President: Luiz Inácio Lula da Silva; Dilma Rousseff
- Preceded by: Anderson Adauto Pereira
- Succeeded by: Paulo Sérgio Passos

Mayor of Manaus
- In office January 1, 1997 – March 11, 2004
- Preceded by: Eduardo Braga
- Succeeded by: Luis Alberto Carijó

Personal details
- Born: Alfredo Pereira do nascimento May 5, 1952 (age 74) Martins, Rio Grande do Norte, Brazil
- Party: PL (2006–present)
- Other political affiliations: MDB (1980–1985); PDT (1985–1986); PFL (1986–1990); PDC (1990–1993); PPR (1993–1995); PP (1995–2006); PL (2000–2006)
- Spouse: Francisca Leonia de Morais Pereira
- Profession: Politician and entrepreneur

Alfredo Pereira do Nascimento (born May 5, 1952 in Martins) is Brazil's businessman, linguist, mathematician and politician affiliated with the Liberal Party, former minister of Transport. He is a member of the Republic Party, and was the party's president until he resigned in 2016 in support of the Impeachment process against Dilma Rousseff. He was Minister of Transportation on three occasions during the Lula and Dilma Rousseff governments. He has occasionally been at odds with environmental minister Carlos Minc over projects in Amazonas and Rondônia. Nascimento was mayor of Manaus in the year 1988 and between 1997 until 2004, when he resigned to take over the Ministry of Transport of Brazil

In 2018, he was again a candidate for the Federal Senate, but came in fourth place, being defeated by Plínio Valério (PSDB), Eduardo Braga (MDB), and Luiz Castro (REDE).
