= Eduardo Braga =

Brazilian politician and businessman

- Official portrait

Senator for Amazonas
- Incumbent
- Assumed office February 1, 2011

Senate Majority Leader
- Incumbent
- Assumed office February 1, 2019
- Preceded by: Office established

Minister of Mines and Energy
- In office January 1, 2015 – April 21, 2016
- President: Dilma Rousseff
- Preceded by: Edison Lobão
- Succeeded by: Marco Antônio Martins Almeida

45th Governor of Amazonas
- In office January 1, 2003 – March 31, 2010
- Preceded by: Amazonino Mendes
- Succeeded by: Omar Aziz

Personal details
- Born: December 6, 1960 (age 65) Belém, Pará, Brazil
- Party: MDB

Carlos Eduardo de Sousa Braga (born December 6, 1960) is a Brazilian politician and businessman, currently a republic senator from Amazonas. Better known as Eduardo Braga, he was a councilman of Manaus (1981–1985), state deputy of amazonas (1987–1991), federal deputy from amazonas (1991–1993), vice-mayor of Manaus (1993–1994) and mayor of Manaus (1994–1997). He campaigned for the government of Amazonas in 1998 and for the city hall of Manaus in 2000 without success. He was elected governor of Amazonas in October 2002, in the first turn, with 52.4% of the votes, and assumed office on 1 January 2003. In 2006, Braga was re-elected, in the first turn. He renounced in 2010 to run for the Senate on the elections of that year.

On January 1, 2015, he was named Minister of Mines and Energy in the cabinet of Dilma Rousseff.

He is a member of the Brazilian Democratic Movement (MDB).

== See also ==
- List of mayors of Manaus
- Benjamin Constant Bridge

Federal Senate
Office established	Senate Majority Leader; 2019–present	Incumbent
Political offices
Preceded by Edison Lobão	Minister of Mines and Energy; 2015–2016	Succeeded by Marco Antônio Martins Almeida
Preceded by Amazonino Mendes	45th Governor of Amazonas; 2003–2010	Succeeded by Omar Aziz
