= Legislative Assembly of Amazonas =

State Legislature of Amazonas, Brazil

Coordinates: 03°05′01″S 60°01′19″W

Legislative Assembly of Amazonas Assembleia Legislativa do Amazonas
- 20th legislature

Type
- Type: Unicameral

Leadership
- President: Roberto Cidade, UNIÃO since 2 February 2021
- Government Leader: Felipe Souza, PRD
- Opposition Leader: Wilker Barreto, MOBILIZA

Structure
- Seats: 24 members
- Political groups: UNIÃO (5) Avante (4) PL (3) Podemos (3) Brazil of Hope (2) Republicans (2) Democrat (1) (Note: Formerly the Brazilian Woman's Party (PMB). Not to be confused with the now-dissolved Democrats (DEM). On 2 December 2025, the TSE approved a name change.) MDB (1) MOBILIZA (1) PRD (1) Unaffiliated (1)

Elections
- Voting system: Proportional representation
- Last election: 2 October 2022
- Next election: 2026

Meeting place
- Edifício Dep. José de Jesus Lins de Albuquerque, Manaus

Website
- www.ale.am.gov.br

The Legislative Assembly of Amazonas (Portuguese: Assembleia Legislativa do Estado do Amazonas or ALEAM) is the state legislature of Amazonas. The parliament was founded in 1852 as the Provincial Legislature of the province of Amazonas. It has been installed in four different buildings, the current headquarters was opened on July 28, 2006.
