= Technical School Network Roberto Rocca =

International network of secondary schools

Roberto Rocca Technical School Network
- Red de Escuelas Técnicas Roberto Rocca
- Founded: 2013
- Founder: Techint
- Type: Technical secondary school network
- Purpose: Technical and STEM education linked to industrial skills
- Parent organization: Techint

Technical School Network Roberto Rocca (Spanish: Red de Escuelas Técnicas Roberto Rocca) is an international network of technical secondary schools promoted by the Techint Group and implemented through its member companies Tenaris and Ternium.

The network began with the opening of a school in Campana (Argentina) in 2013 and expanded with a second campus in Pesquería (Mexico) in 2016. A third campus in Santa Cruz (Brazil) was announced in 2023 and began classes with its first cohort in 2025, according to local press coverage and institutional communications.

In June 2026, the principal of the Campana school stated that the network planned to open a fourth school in partnership with Tenaris.

== Name ==
The network is named after Roberto Rocca (1922–2003), an Italian-Argentine industrialist associated with the growth of Techint.

== History ==
=== Campana (Argentina) ===
The first Roberto Rocca technical school opened in 2013 in Campana, Buenos Aires Province, and was reported at the time as planned for an initial capacity of 420 students, with specializations in electronics and electromechanics. The opening was presented as the start of a broader network of technical schools in countries where Techint Group companies operate.

In 2019, the Campana campus graduated its first cohort of students. In 2023, the school marked its tenth anniversary with public activities focused on education and employability.

A 2024 visit by Argentina’s Ministry of Human Capital described the Campana school as a Techint educational project and reported that the campus had 454 students receiving full or partial scholarships at that time.

The school offers a diploma program in educational innovation and school management for local school principals. The program was nearing the end of its second cohort in June 2026. The school also has an agreement with the Organization of Ibero-American States (OEI) to provide training for local teachers.

The Campana school's vocational training center (Centro de Formación Profesional, CFP) offers courses for local youth and adults. In September 2026, the center and Tenaris launched a training program for small and medium-sized enterprises and companies in the industrial and service sectors. It included courses in robotics, automation, programmable logic controllers (PLCs), and advanced electrical systems, as well as training tailored to individual companies. The program was launched in partnership with industrial associations in Campana, Zárate, Escobar, Tigre, and Exaltación de la Cruz, and with business associations representing the industrial parks in Pilar, Malvinas Argentinas, and Tortuguitas.

=== Pesquería (Mexico) ===
The second school opened in Pesquería, Nuevo León, in 2016, offering technical programs in mechatronics and electromechanics. The Pesquería campus received LEED Gold certification in 2018, according to a campus factsheet published by Ternium México.

In July 2019, the first graduating class in Pesquería completed the program, with 124 graduates reported by Milenio.

=== Santa Cruz (Brazil) ===
In 2023, Ternium announced the construction of a third campus in Santa Cruz (Rio de Janeiro), reporting an investment of R$210 million and technical tracks in mechatronics and electromechanics. In 2025, Brazilian press coverage reported the start of classes for the first cohort of students at the Santa Cruz campus.

== Educational model ==
Press coverage of the Campana campus has described a pedagogical approach based on active learning methods, including project-based learning (Spanish: Aprendizaje por Proyectos).

In 2022, media coverage described a redesign of learning spaces at the Campana campus associated with Danish designer Rosan Bosch, with references to school design experiences in the United States and Spain.

=== Vocational internships ===
Techint's Roberto Rocca educational initiatives include the Gen Técnico Roberto Rocca vocational internship program for students attending technical secondary schools. It combines training inside industrial plants with supervision by company tutors. At Ternium's General Savio plant in San Nicolás de los Arroyos, around 190 students from technical schools in San Nicolás and Ramallo participate each year.

== Roberto Rocca Education Day ==
Techint and the school network observe 10 June as Roberto Rocca Education Day (Spanish: Día de la Educación Roberto Rocca), coinciding with the anniversary of Roberto Rocca's death. The annual gathering brings together business representatives, public officials, education specialists and teachers to discuss the future of the education system.

The 2026 event included education specialists Cecilia Veleda of CIPPEC, Mariano Narodowski of Torcuato di Tella University and Alejandro Piscitelli. Provincial education officials also participated in the discussions.

== Recognition ==
In 2020, the short documentary School to Progress (Spanish: Escuela al Progreso), filmed in Pesquería, was reported as a winner of a regional Emmy Award in a news and documentary category.

In 2022, the Pesquería campus was reported to have become the first Authorized and Certified Training Center (FACT) by Festo in the state of Nuevo León and the third in Mexico, in an initiative that also involved Siemens.

In 2023, the Campana school was shortlisted among 50 finalists for the World’s Best School Prizes, and was reported among the top 10 shortlisted schools in the Innovation category.

== Student activities ==
Students from the network have participated in international robotics and innovation competitions. In 2022, a team from the Campana school represented Argentina at the FIRST Global Challenge in Geneva, Switzerland.

In 2018, the Pesquería campus was reported to have participated in the World Educational Robot Contest (WER) in Shanghai, China, as the only high school representing Nuevo León state.

In 2023, FIRST’s official event records list Team 9213 (TECUANI) as representing Escuela Técnica Roberto Rocca in Pesquería and receiving the Rookie Inspiration Award at the FIRST Robotics Competition Championship (Johnson Division).

In 2024, Reforma reported that an all-female team from Pesquería qualified at WER México to advance toward the global competition in Shanghai, China.

In 2025, the network was linked to the steelChallenge-20 High School Category Pilot organised by steeluniversity in partnership with Roberto Rocca Educational Programs. The steelChallenge-20 Regional Championship held on 25 November 2025 included a high-school pilot category, and the competition cycle recorded 2,438 participants worldwide overall. The high-school pilot involved 190 secondary students from several countries, including students from the Campana and Pesquería Roberto Rocca technical schools, competing with an electric arc furnace simulation under cost and basic emissions constraints.

In October 2026, the Campana school hosted a ceremony marking the 50th anniversary of the Roberto Rocca Scholarship Program, established in 1976. At the ceremony, Tenaris and the Fundación Hermanos Agustín y Enrique Rocca awarded 356 scholarships to secondary school and university students from Campana and Zárate.
