= Family business =

Commercial enterprise run by a family

Family business is a type of commercial organization in which management decisions are made or influenced by multiple generations of a family, related by blood, marriage or adoption, who have both the ability to influence the vision of the business and the willingness to use this ability to pursue distinctive goals. They are closely identified with the firm through leadership or ownership. Owner-manager entrepreneurial firms are not considered to be family businesses because they lack the multi-generational dimension and family influence that create the unique dynamics and relationships of family businesses.

== Overview ==
A family business is the oldest and most common model of economic organization. The vast majority of businesses throughout the world—from corner shops to multinational publicly listed organizations with hundreds of thousands of employees—can be considered as family businesses.

Based on research of the Forbes 400 richest Americans, 44% of the Forbes 400 member fortunes were derived by being a member of or in association with a family business. The economic prevalence and importance of this kind of business are often underestimated. Throughout most of the 20th century, academics and economists were intrigued by a newer, "improved" model: large publicly traded companies run in an apparently rational, bureaucratic manner by well trained "organization men". Entrepreneurial and family firms, with their specific management models and complicated psychological processes, often fell short by comparison.

Privately owned or family-controlled enterprises are not always easy to study. In many cases, they are not subject to financial reporting requirements, and little information is made public about financial performance. Ownership may be distributed through trusts or holding companies, and family members themselves may not be fully informed about the ownership structure of their enterprise. However, as the 21st-century global economic model replaces the old industrial model, government policy makers, economists, and academics turn to entrepreneurial and family enterprises as a prime source of wealth creation and employment.

In some countries, many of the largest publicly listed firms are family-owned. A firm is said to be family-owned if a person is the controlling shareholder; that is, a person (rather than a state, corporation, management trust, or mutual fund) can garner enough shares to assure at least 20% of the voting rights and the highest percentage of voting rights in comparison to other shareholders.
Some of the world's largest family-run businesses are Walmart (United States), Volkswagen Group (Germany), Samsung Group (Korea) and Tata Group (India).

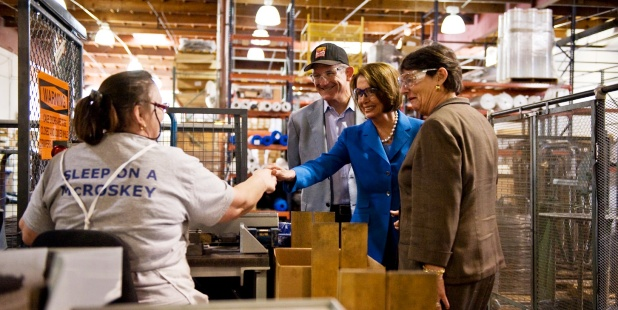
Congresswoman Pelosi greets employees of McRoskey Mattress Company, a family-owned, San Francisco mattress manufacturer founded in 1899.

The "Global Family Business Index" comprises the largest 500 family firms around the globe. In this index—published for a first time in 2015 by Center for Family Business University of St. Gallen and EY—for a privately held firm, a firm is classified as a family firm in case a family controls more than 50% of the voting rights. For a publicly listed firm, a firm is classified as a family firm in case the family holds at least 32% of the voting rights.

Family owned businesses account for over 30% of companies with sales over $1 billion.

In a family business, two or more members within the management team are drawn from the owning family. Family businesses can have owners who are not family members. Family businesses may also be managed by individuals who are not members of the family. However, family members are often involved in the operations of their family business in some capacity and, in smaller companies, usually one or more family members are the senior officers and managers. In India, many businesses that are now public companies were once family businesses.

Family participation as managers and/or owners of a business can strengthen the company because family members are often loyal and dedicated to the family enterprise. However, such participation may present unique problems because the dynamics of the family system and the dynamics of the business systems are often not in balance.

== Problems ==
The interests of the entire family may not be balanced with the interests of their business. For example, if a family needs its business to distribute funds for living expenses and retirement, but the business requires those to stay competitive, the interests of the entire family and the business are not aligned.

Nepotism has been listed as a problem with family businesses. Forbes writes that "nepotism in family businesses is a phenomenon that has been present for centuries" and that it is "prevalent" in such businesses. Nepotism-based favouritism contributes to a poorer workplace atmosphere and tension, which can impact worker contributions to the organisation.

The interest of one family member may not be aligned with another family member. For example, a family member who is an owner may want to sell the business to maximize their return, but a family member who is an owner and also a manager may want to keep the company because it represents their career and they want their children to have the opportunity to work in the company. Children may not share this interest in managing or continuing the family business: the European Commission noted in 2008 that a "lack of appreciation of the traditional role of family business" could have an impact on the European economy as older business owners retire.

== Three circles model ==
The challenge for business families is that family, ownership, and business roles involve different and sometimes conflicting values, goals, and actions. For example, family members put a high priority on emotional capital—the family success that unites them through consecutive generations. Executives in the business are concerned about strategy and social capital—the reputation of their firm in the marketplace. Owners are interested in financial capital—performance in terms of wealth creation.

A three-circles model is often used to show the three principal roles in a family-owned or -controlled organization: Family, Ownership and Management. This model shows how the roles may overlap.

Everyone in the family (in all generations) clearly belongs to the family circle, but some family members will never own shares in the family business, or ever work there. A family member is concerned with social capital (reputation within the community), dividends, and family unity.

The Ownership circle may include family members, investors and/or employee-owners. An owner is concerned with financial capital (business performance and dividends). The Management circle typically includes non-family members who are employed by the family business. Family members may also be employees. An employee is concerned with social capital (reputation), emotional capital (career opportunities, bonuses and fair performance measures).

A few people—for example, the founder or a senior family member—may hold all three roles: family member, owner and employee. These individuals are intensely connected to the family business, and concerned with any or all of the above sources of value creation.

== Genogram ==
A genogram is an organization chart for the family. It is an enhanced family tree that shows not only family events like births and deaths, but also indicates the relationships (close, conflicted, cut-off, etc.) among individuals in the family. It is a useful tool for spotting relationship patterns across generations, and decrypting seemingly irrational behavior.

Family myths—sets of beliefs that are shared by the family members—can play important defensive and protective roles in families. Myths help people cope with stress and anxiety and, by prescribing ritualistic behavior patterns, will enable them to establish a common front against the outside world. They provide a rationale for the way people behave, but because much of what makes up a family myth takes place deep beneath the surface, they also conceal the true issues, problems, and conflicts. Although these family myths can turn into a blueprint for family action, they can also turn into straitjackets, reducing a family's flexibility and capacity to respond to new situations.

== Parallel planning processes ==
All businesses require planning, but business families face the additional planning task of balancing family and business demands. There are five critical issues where the needs of the family and the demands of the business overlap—and require parallel planning action to ensure that business success does not create a family or business disaster.

1. Capital How are the firm’s financial resources allocated between different and family demands?
2. Control Who has decision-making power in the family and firm?
3. Careers How are individuals selected for senior leadership and governance positions in the firm or family?
4. Conflict How do we prevent this natural element of human relationships from becoming the default pattern of interaction?
5. Culture How are the family and business values sustained and transmitted to owners, employees and younger family members?

== Emotional dimension ==
The challenge faced by family businesses and their stakeholders, is to recognise the issues that they face, understand how to develop strategies to address them and more importantly, to create narratives, or family stories that explain the emotional dimension of the issues to the family.

The most intractable family business issues are not the business problems the organisation faces, but the emotional issues that compound them. Many years of achievement through generations can be destroyed by the next, if the family fails to address the psychological issues they face. Applying psychodynamic concepts will help to explain behaviour and will enable the family to prepare for life cycle transitions and other issues that may arise. Family-run organisations need a new understanding and a broader perspective on the human dynamics of family firms with two complementary frameworks, psychodynamic and family systematic.

== Structuring ==
When the family business is basically owned and operated by one person, that person usually does the necessary balancing automatically. For example, the founder may decide the business needs to build a new plant and take less money out of the business for a period so the business can accumulate cash needed to expand. In making this decision, the founder is balancing his personal interests (taking cash out) with the needs of the business (expansion).

The assets that are owned by the family, in most family businesses, are hard to separate from the assets that belong to the business.

== Succession ==
There appear to be two main factors affecting the development of family business and succession process: the size of the family, in relative terms the volume of business, and suitability to lead the organization, in terms of managerial ability, technical and commitment. Arieu proposed a model in order to classify family firms into four scenarios: political, openness, foreign management and natural succession.

Potential successors who had professional experience outside the family business may decide to leave the firm to found a new one, either with or without the support of the family. Instead, successors tend to be characterized by professional experience only within the family business. The education of potential successors is a critical issue in the succession process because it affects the endowment of managerial capabilities of the firm. If the succession process has been planned, the incumbent and successor usually show higher levels of satisfaction. Particularly important is the incumbent’s willingness to step down. The incumbent gradually gives away his power to the successor. This happens step by step and may take several years. Such a transfer of power can take the form of the incumbent providing the successor with entrepreneurial resources that foster the firm's innovation. Eventually, the successor gains all the authority and influence while the incumbent steps down, leaves to company completely, or remains as an advisor An international body called International Council for Family Business (ICFB) having professor Alain Ndedi as Board of Trustees chairman, is assisting worldwide the private sector and non for profit organisations (Universities, Foundations, etc) to develop effective and successful planning process.

== Success ==
Successfully balancing the differing interests of family members and/or the interests of one or more family members on the one hand and the interests of the business on the other hand require the people involved to have the competencies, character and commitment to do this work.

Family-owned companies present special challenges to those who run them, and they develop their own cultures and procedures as they grow and mature.

Often family members can benefit from involving more than one professional advisor, each having the particular skill set needed by the family. Some of the skill sets that might be needed include communication, conflict resolution, family systems, finance, legal, accounting, insurance, investing, leadership development, management development, and strategic planning.

Ownership in a family business will also show maturity of the business. If all the shares rest with one individual, a family business is still in its infant stage, even if the revenue is strong.

== Family businesses by country ==
=== Japan ===
In Japan are located the two longest-running companies in the world, the hotels Nishiyama Onsen Keiunkan founded in 705 AD and Hoshyo ryo-kan founded in 718 AD, currently managed by the 46th family generation. In third place is the Italian family business, "Pontifical Marinelli Bell Foundry" owned since the year 1000 by the Marinelli family of Agnone, in the province of Isernia.

=== United States ===
Some of the largest family businesses worldwide are Walmart, founded by Sam Walton and his family in Arkansas in 1962, and the Ford Motor Company, which Henry Ford started in 1899 as the eldest of six siblings in Detroit.

=== Spain ===
In Spain, there are 2.8 million family businesses that produce 70% of GDP and generate more than 70% of employment.

In the hotel industry, the Riu family, owners of RIU Hotels, has been in charge of the company's management for four generations. The Escarrer family owns 52% of Meliá Hotels International, founded in 1956 by Gabriel Escarrer Juliá, father of the group's current CEO.

=== Argentina ===
In Argentina, family businesses contribute more than 50% of the Gross Domestic Product and 60% of jobs.

Grupo Macri, founded in 1970 by Franco Macri, has been an influential conglomerate in the region across various sectors, as well as Mauricio Macri's platform to reach the nation's presidency in 2015. Techint, the country's main steel producer, was founded by Agostino Rocca and the group's management passed to his son Roberto and his grandson Paolo.

In agricultural production, families with a tradition in the sector formed agro-industrial groups such as Aceitera General Deheza of the Urquía family; the MSU group, owned by Manuel Santos Uribelarrea Balcarce; and Los Grobo, owned by the Grobocopatel family.

=== Mexico ===
In Mexico, micro, small and medium-sized enterprises (Mipyme) represent 99.8% of the total, contribute 52% of GDP and generate more than 71.9% of employment. According to data from the SME Observatory, in 2002, 65% were family businesses.

Among Mexican family businesses, Grupo Herdez, owned by the Hernández Pons family, and Grupo Lala, both dedicated to the food sector, stand out; as well as Grupo Salinas, with operations in media, banking and retail.

== More examples ==
- Adani Group
- Aditya Birla Group
- ArcelorMittal
- Avantha Group
- Bombardier Inc.
- Bombardier Recreational Products (BRP)
- BMW AG
- Cargill
- Chick-fil-A
- Comcast
- Dillard's
- Ford
- Glencore
- Heineken
- Huy Fong Foods
- IKEA
- Imabari Shipbuilding
- Jolly Time
- Kingfisher Airlines
- Koch, Inc.
- KONE
- Lundberg Family Farms
- Mango
- Nordstrom
- Panda Energy International
- Porsche SE (Volkswagen Group)
- Reliance Industries
- Raymond Group
- Red Bull
- Royal Swinkels
- Satsang Ashram
- Simon Property Group
- Solaris Bus & Coach
- Talking Pictures TV
- Tata Group
- Toyota
- Trump Organization
- Utz Quality Foods
- Walmart
- Wawa
- Wegmans
- WWE

== See also ==
- Bamboo network
- Nepotism
- Palace economy
