= Rocca (surname) =

Rocca is an Italian surname. Notable people with the surname include:

- Agostino Rocca, founder of Techint
- Américo Rocca, Mexican Luchador, or professional wrestler
- Andrea Rocca, Italian musician and film composer
- Angelo Rocca, Italian humanist, librarian and bishop
- Anthony Rocca, Australian rules footballer
- Antonino Rocca, Argentinian professional wrestler
- Antonio Rocca, Italian painter
- Christina B. Rocca, United States Assistant Secretary of State for South and Central Asian Affairs
- Costantino Rocca, Italian golfer
- Daniela Rocca, Italian actress, model and writer
- Enrico Rocca, Italian violin maker of the 19th and the 20th Centuries
- Francesco Rocca, Italian professional football coach and former player
- Giacomo Rocca (or Giacomo della Rocca), Italian painter
- Gianfelice Rocca, Italian businessman, Techint
- Gianni Rocca (1929–2013), Italian sprinter
- Giorgio Rocca, Italian alpine skier
- Giuseppe Rocca, Italian violin maker of the 19th century
- Giustina Rocca, Italian Renaissance figure considered to be the first female lawyer in history
- Iacopo La Rocca, Italian-Australian footballer
- John Rocca, British singer-songwriter and former frontman of Freeez
- Ketty La Rocca, Italian artist during the 1960s and 70s
- Lodovico Rocca (1895–1986), Italian composer
- Maria Laura Rocca, Italian actress and writer
- Mason Rocca, American-born Italian professional basketball player
- Michelle Rocca, presenter of the Eurovision Song Contest 1988
- Mo Rocca, American writer, comedian, and political satirist
- Nick LaRocca, Sicilian-American jazz musician
- Paolo Rocca, president of Techint
- Peter Rocca, American backstroke swimmer
- Sal Rocca, Italian-American member of the Michigan House of Representatives
- Saverio Rocca, Australian American football punter
- Silvia Rocca, Italian ski mountaineer
- Stefania Rocca, Italian actress
- Tory Rocca, member of the Michigan Senate
