= Paolo Bassetti =

Italian businessman

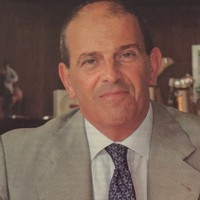
- Born: Paolo Bassetti; October 8, 1964 (age 61); Milan, Italy
- Education: Massachusetts Institute of Technology; London School of Economics; University of Bologna
- Occupations: Vice president Usiminas (2012–2015); President Ternium do Brasil (2015–2018)
- Children: 2
- Parent(s): Carla Campanini Bonomi (mother); Piero Bassetti (father)

Paolo Bassetti (Milan, October 8, 1964) holds a bachelor's degree from the University of Bologna, a master's degree in Economics and Latin American Studies from the London School of Economics (LSE) and a Sloan Program from the Massachusetts Institute of Technology (MIT), in Cambridge.

He was executive of the Techint for 26 years. He participated actively in major industrial and organizational development operations of the Techint group. He was vice president of Usiminas from 2012 to 2014 and president of Ternium in Brazil from 2015 to 2018. In early April 2018, he left the company's leadership.

Born in Milan, he is married and has two children. Currently, Bassetti lives between São Paulo, Milan and Eastern Europe. Throughout his career, he has lived and worked in Italy, Mexico, Argentina, Romania and Brazil.

In Brazil, he played an important role in renegotiating the shareholder agreement with Japan's Nippon Steel, ending a corporate fight in Usiminas that lasted more than 3 years. In addition, it was part of the creation of Exiros (8 B / $ turnover), the purchase of Silcotub-Tenaris and its restructuring in Eastern Europe, the purchase of the Usiminas Control Group and the first Ternium factory in Brazil. He served as Chairman of Musa S.A (2012–2014) and Counselor of MRS (2012–2015).
