= Daniel Novegil =

Argentine business executive

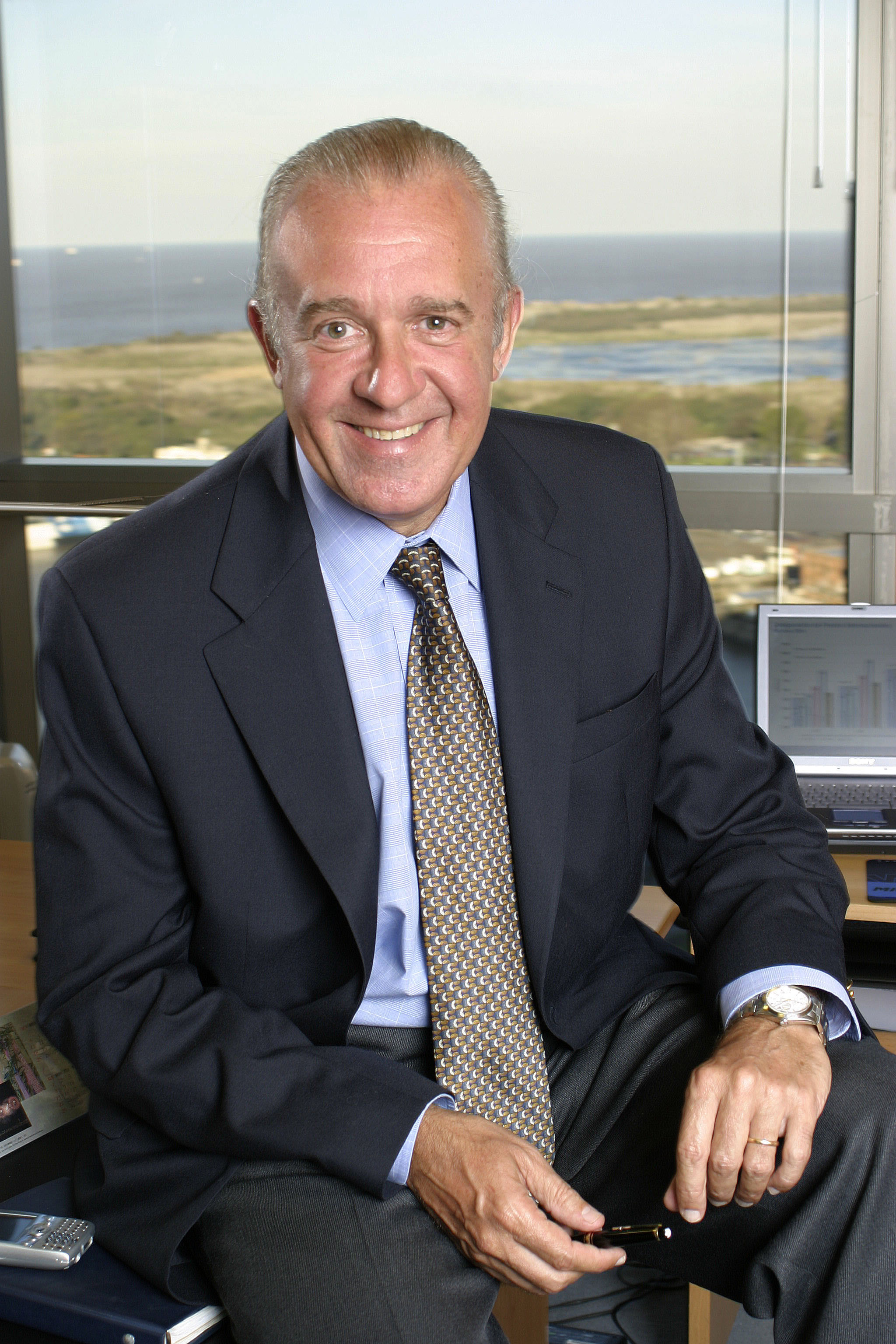
Daniel Novegil - Ternium's CEO

Daniel Agustín Novegil is an Argentine business executive. He is currently the chief executive officer of Ternium, main company in the steelmaking industry of Latin America. Novegil leads this firm since 2005, after working as executive director of Siderar (Argentina), SIDOR (Venezuela), Hylsa and IMSA (México).

== Professional career ==
In 1978, Daniel Novegil entered Techint in the planning and new business area. In 1993, he became General Director of Siderar, the main steelmaking company in Argentina. He was SIDOR's Executive Director from 1997 to 2003, until President Hugo Chávez nationalized the Venezuelan firm in 2008. In 2005, Novegil led the purchase of Hylsa, based in Monterrey, Mexico, giving birth to Ternium. Two years later, he negotiated the acquisition of IMSA, creating the largest steelmaking company in Latin America. From that moment onwards, Daniel Novegil is the company’s CEO.

In 2012, Ternium became part of Usiminas’ control group, after the acquisition of 27,7% of the Brazilian Steelmaking Company. Daniel Novegil is a member of its board of directors, an active member of the board of directors of the World Steel Association, the international trade body that gathers 170 steel producers worldwide and an ALACERO Director (Latin American Steel Association).

== Education ==
Daniel Novegil studied Industrial Engineering in Universidad de Buenos Aires (UBA) from 1970 to 1975. In 1984 he obtained a Masters of Science in management from Stanford University, and has been a member of the advisory board of the Sloan Masters Program from the same university since 1999. In the 90s he carried out strategic planning studies in the MIT (Massachusetts Institute of Technology), a seminar of management in Wharton School of the University of Pennsylvania and an executive program in the Association for Overseas Technical Scholarship (A.O.T.S.) in Japan.
