= Fausto Junior =

Brazilian politician

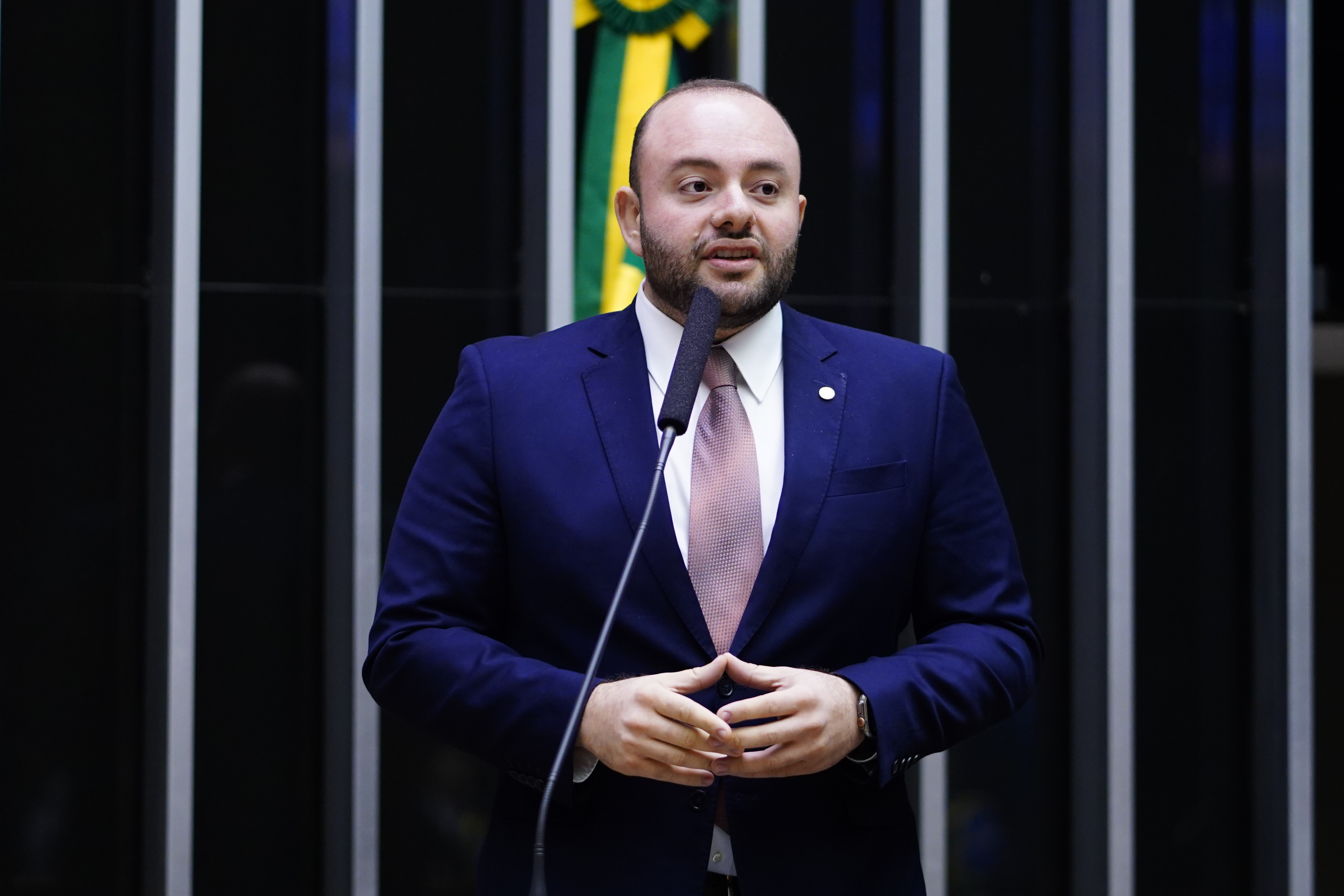

Assembly Member for Federal Deputy for Amazonas
- In office 1 February 2023 – Incumbent

Assembly Member for State Deputy of Amazonas
- In office 1 February 2019 – 1 February 2023

Secretary of Secretary of Urban Development of Amazonas
- In office 18 January 2024 – 29 November 2024
- Succeeded by: Marcellus Campelo

Personal details
- Born: Fausto Vieira dos Santos Junior; 20 December 1992 (age 33) Manaus, Amazonas, Brazil
- Party: Brazil Union (2022–present)
- Other political affiliations: PV (2009–2020); PRTB (2020–2020); MDB (2020–2022)
- Occupation: Politician

Fausto Vieira dos Santos Junior (20 December 1992) is a Brazilian politician affiliated with Brazil Union (UNIÃO). He is currently serving his first term as a federal deputy for Amazonas.

== Biography ==
=== First years ===
Fausto Vieira dos Santos Junior was born in Manaus, capital of the state of Amazonas, in 1992. In 2017, he started his law degree at ESBAM, located in Manaus. He remained at the school until 2022, but did not finish the course.

=== Politics ===
A member of the Green Party (PV), he was elected to the state legislature of Amazonas after winning 19,446 votes in 2018. In May 2020, he left the PV to join the Brazilian Labour Renewal Party (PRTB). In December 2020, he announced his affiliation to the Brazilian Democratic Movement (MDB). He remained in the party until March 2022, when he joined Brazil Union (UNIÃO).

During the Parliamentary Commission of Inquiry into COVID-19, he was summoned by Senator Marcos Rogério (DEM) for having been the rapporteur of the CPI into the management of the COVID-19 pandemic in the state of Amazonas. The deputy was questioned for not having indicted or summoned Governor Wilson Lima (UNIÃO), an administration marked by a lack of oxygen in Manaus. Fausto indicated that such procedures were outside the scope of the investigation and that the governor was already being investigated by the police. The explanation did not convince the senators and Senator Soraya Thronicke (PSL) confronted him, saying that the responsibility for investigating governors lies with the Legislative Assembly. Senator Omar Aziz (PSD), president of the Covid CPI, said that the decision not to indict the governor of Amazonas was related to Fausto Junior's "personal interests": "I'm going to point out why the deputy didn't indict the governor of Amazonas, and the reason is very big," said Aziz.

After his participation in the CPI, Fausto sued Omar Aziz for abuse of authority, insult, threats and defamation in a criminal complaint to the Supreme Federal Court (STF). After the lawsuit, Fausto used his social networks in a post that called Aziz 'corrupt', which led Aziz to sue Fausto. After a decision by Judge Maria Eunice Torres, Aziz won the case, which led to Fausto being ordered to pay compensation of eighty thousand reais.

On 2 October 2022, Fausto was elected to the position of federal deputy for Amazonas with 87,876 votes. On the presidential front, he declared his support for far-right candidate Jair Bolsonaro against Luiz Inácio Lula da Silva. In January 2024, he took a leave of absence from office to take over as Secretary of State for Sanitation, Housing and Urban Development of Manaus (Sederub) in the government of Wilson Lima. His leave allowed deputy Pauderney Avelino to take up the position of federal deputy in Brasília. Júnior remained in office until November 2024, when he returned to his duties as a congressman in Brasília. At Sedurb, he was replaced by civil engineer Marcellus Campelo. In 2026, he ran for reelection, having received more than 120,000 votes.

==== Electoral performance ====
Electoral performance of Fausto Junior
Year	Position	Party	Votes	Result	Ref.
2018	State deputy of Amazonas	PV	19,446	Elected	
2022	Federal deputy of Amazonas	UNIÃO	87,776	Elected	
2026	Federal deputy of Amazonas	UNIÃO	122,197	Elected	

== Honors ==
- 2024 – Medal of Legislative Merit awarded by the Legislative Assembly of Amazonas (ALEAM) through a proposal made by state deputy Mário César Filho.
