= Bassetti (disambiguation) =

Bassetti may refer to:

== People ==
- Fred Bassetti (1917–2013), American architect
- Gualtiero Bassetti (born 1942), Italian cardinal of the Roman Catholic Church
- Marco Antonio Bassetti (1586–1630), Italian painter
- Marco Bassetti (born 1957), Italian manager and entrepreneur
- Paolo Bassetti (born 1964), Italian economist
- Samuel "Sam" Bassetti (born 1991), American cyclist

== Other uses ==
- Bassetti, an Italian textile company
- Bassetti Architects, an architectural firm based in Seattle, Washington
- Enatimene bassetti, a marine gastropod mollusk in the family Muricidae

== See also ==
- Bassett (disambiguation)
