= Larocca =

Larocca or Larroca is a surname. Notable people with the surname include:

- José Maria Larocca (born 1969), Argentinian show jumper
- Josh LaRocca (born 1973), American football player
- Mike Larocca, American film and television producer
- Salvador Larroca, Spanish comic book artist

== See also ==
- Rocca (surname)
