= Gianfelice Rocca =

Italian billionaire businessman (born 1948)

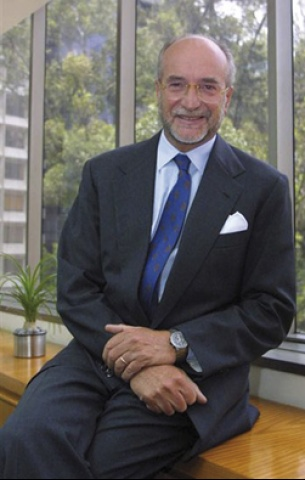
- Born: Gianfelice Mario Rocca; 2 March 1948 (age 78); Milan, Italy
- Education: University of Milan
- Occupation: Businessman
- Known for: Chairman of the Techint Group
- Children: 2
- Parent: Roberto Rocca
- Relatives: Agostino Rocca (grandfather); Paolo Rocca (brother)

Gianfelice Mario Rocca (born 2 March 1948) is an Italian billionaire businessman. He is chairman of the Techint Group and Istituto Clinico Humanitas.

== Education ==
Rocca has a bachelor's degree in physics from the University of Milan, and a PMD from the Harvard Business School in Boston.

== Career ==
Rocca joined the Techint Group in 1974. In 1980, at the age of 32, he was appointed head of corporate activities in Italy, Europe and Mexico. He has been chairman of the Techint Group since 1997.

The Techint Group consists of: Tenaris, Ternium, Techint Engineering & Construction, Tenova, Tecpetrol and Humanitas. In 2018, the Group had a workforce of 57,100 people and reported revenues of US$23,5 billion.

In the 1990s, in Rozzano (Milan), Rocca founded the Istituto Clinico Humanitas, today one of Europe's most important hospitals with an international research and teaching centre. The creation of the Humanitas Clinic marked the start of a new business in the Healthcare sector, which has since grown through the acquisition of a number of other important hospitals in Italy, coordinated by the Humanitas S.p.A. company. In 2010, through an agreement with the Università degli Studi di Milano, an International Medical School was instituted at the Istituto Clinico Humanitas in Rozzano offering an English-language degree course in Medicine and Surgery.

Humanitas and Tenova have both become Harvard University management case studies.

In July 2014, Humanitas University was founded dedicated to life sciences, and closely related to the IRCCS Istituto Clinico Humanitas, of which Rocca is president.

From June 2013 to June 2017, he was president of Assolombarda.

From May 2004 to May 2012, he was vice-president of Confindustria with a mandate for education. From June 2012 to June 2016 he was a member of the Governing Board of the European Institute of Innovation and Technology (EIT). He is an honorary member of the Italian Institute of Technology and a member of the Scientific Committee of the Foundation Politecnico of Milan.

Since November 2014, he has been a member of the management board of Luigi Bocconi University.

In Italy, he is a member of the Brembo S.p.A. Board, Buzzi Unicem S.p.A. e dell'Advisory Board of the Politecnico di Milano, and from July 2017 he is a member of the Board of Directors of Fondazione Museo Nazionale della Scienza e della Tecnologia Leonardo da Vinci.

At the international level, he is a member of many organizations: the Trilateral Commission, the European Advisory Board of Harvard Business School, the executive committee of Aspen Institute, the European Round Table of Industrialists and the International Advisory Board of the Cancer Center of the Beth Israel Medical Center. He is also vice-president of the Aspen Institute Italia.

In June 2020 he was appointed Special Advisor Life Sciences Confindustria.

== Appointments ==
From June 2013 to June 2017, Rocca was President of Assolombarda, the largest territorial association of the entire entrepreneurial system in Italy, which groups about 5.100 firms located in the Lombardy region and is part of Confindustria (Italian employers' organization). From May 2004 to May 2012 Rocca was vice president for Education of Confindustria, the leading association of Italian industrialists and from June 2012 to June 2016 he was member of the EIT Governing Board (European Institute of Innovation and Technology). He is currently an honorary member of the Italian Institute of Technology and a member of the Scientific Committee of the Foundation Politecnico of Milan. Since November 2014 he has been a member of the management board of the Luigi Bocconi University and, since September 2016, of the LUISS University.

In Italy, he is a member of the boards of Allianz, Brembo, Buzzi Unicem.

At the international level, he is a member of the Trilateral Commission, the European Advisory Board of Harvard Business School, the executive committee of Aspen Institute and the Allianz Group Advisory Board. From July 2017, he is a member of the Board of Directors of Fondazione Museo Nazionale della Scienza e della Tecnologia Leonardo da Vinci.

At the international level, he is a member of the Trilateral Commission, the European Advisory Board of Harvard Business School, the European Round Table of Industrialists and the International Advisory Board of the Cancer Center of the Beth Israel Medical Center.

== Social activities ==
He is chairman of the Rocca Foundation, a body active in a number of social and educational projects around the world. In 2005, in memory of his father, the foundation announced the "Progetto Roberto Rocca", an innovative agreement between the Massachusetts Institute of Technology and Milan Politecnico to promote cooperation between the two distinguished universities through exchanges of graduate students and post-doctorate researchers in Italy and the US.

== Honours ==
In 2007, Rocca was made a Cavaliere del Lavoro and in 2009 he was awarded an honorary degree in Management Engineering by Politecnico di Milano. In 2010 the President of the Italian Republic, Giorgio Napolitano, presented Rocca with the 2009 Leonardo Award for his contribution to enhancing Italy's international standing in steelmaking, energy and infrastructure. In 2018 he was appointed by the President of the Italian Republic, Sergio Mattarella, "Commendatore" for his commitment and the contribution he has given to the country in the economic field

As of September 2020, he is a member of the Italian Aspen Institute.

== Other interests ==
A keen yachtsman and mountaineer, in 1970 Rocca took part in the expedition organized by the "Ragni di Lecco" mountaineering group to explore the Cerro Torre in Patagonia, regarded as one of the world's most inaccessible peaks. The experience prepared the ground for the conquest of the Cerro Torre by the "Ragni di Lecco" in 1974 and was the start of Gianfelice Rocca's long-standing association with the group. In 2007, plans were organized for the ascent of an unexplored face of the Cerro Piergiorgio in Patagonia, in memory of Agostino Rocca, Gianfelice and Paolo Rocca's brother, who had died in 2001. In 2008, mountaineers Christian Brenna and Hervè Barmasse became the first to climb the north face of the Piergiorgio, dedicating their ascent to Agostino Rocca by calling it La Routa de l'Hermano. In 2011, Gianfelice Rocca became an honorary member of the "Ragni di Lecco" mountaineering group.

== Personal life ==
Rocca lives in Milan, is married and has two children.
