= Paolo Rocca =

Argentine-Italian businessman (born 1952)

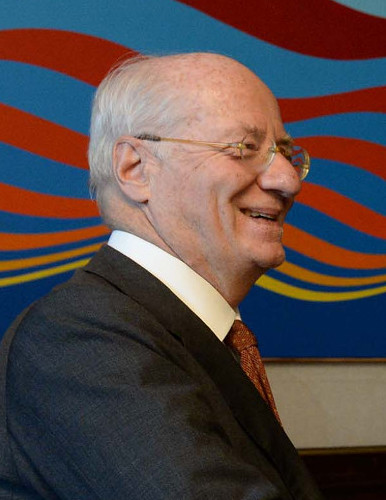
- Rocca in 2017
- Born: 14 October 1952 (age 73); Milan, Italy
- Education: University of Milan
- Occupation: Businessman
- Father: Roberto Rocca
- Relatives: Agostino Rocca (grandfather); Gianfelice Rocca (brother)

Paolo Rocca (born 1952) is an Argentine-Italian businessman, CEO of the Techint Group, which owns Tenaris, Ternium and other companies in the engineering, construction and energy sectors. He is also chairman of Tenaris, and chairman of Ternium. As of September 2026, Forbes estimated his net worth at US$7.7 billion.

== Early life ==
Paolo Rocca was born in Milan, Italy, in 1952. He is the son of Roberto Rocca, who was Honorary Chairman of Techint, and grandson of Agostino Rocca, founder of this industrial group. Paolo Rocca earned a degree in political science from the Università degli Studi di Milano. In 1985, he attended the PMD at Harvard Business School.

== Career ==
After having been an assistant to the executive director of the World Bank, in 1985 Paolo Rocca began his career at Techint Group as assistant to the chairman of the board of directors. In 1990 he assumed as executive vice-president of Siderca.

=== Techint ===
He is the CEO of Techint. He also served as CEO of Tenaris from 2002 until May 2026, when Gabriel Podskubka succeeded him; Rocca remained chairman of the company. In addition, he is chairman of the board of directors of Tamsa and of the board of directors of Ternium, and director of the Techint Financial Corporation. Rocca led Techint in a series of acquisitions in Latin America and the world, which led to the development of operations in more than 20 countries.

== Notebook case ==
In November 2018, Rocca was indicted by the Argentine judge overseeing an investigation into the so-called notebook case as part of a graft case. The charges resulted from testimony that a company executive had paid bribes to speed up the compensation to Rocca's group that resulted from the nationalization of SIDOR by the Venezuelan government.

In April 2019, the Argentine court of appeals dropped all the charges against Rocca pending further investigation.

== Boards and awards ==
Paolo Rocca is a member of the executive committee of the World Steel Association and was the chairman of this association during the 2009–2010 period. He was a member of the International Advisory Committee of New York Stock Exchange, and of the advisory board of the Inter-American Development Bank (IDB) private sector. In 2004 within the "Argentina-México: Visión y Perspectivas” forum, he was awarded with the Orden Mexicana del Aguila Azteca. In 2008 he was recognized by Fundación Konex with the “2008 Platinum Konex Prize: Industry businessmen”; and in 2011 he was chosen “Steelmaker of the Year” by the Association of Iron and Steel Technology (AIST). In 2013 the Columbia Business School honored Paolo Rocca with the "Deming Cup" in recognition to the impact of his leadership on Tenaris's competitiveness.
