= Roberto Rocca =

Argentine businessman

Roberto Rocca

Roberto Rocca (1922 – June 10, 2003) was a prominent Italian-born naturalized Argentinian businessman.

== Overview ==
Roberto Rocca was born in Milan, in 1922, as the eldest son of Maria Queirazza and Agostino Rocca. The elder Rocca was an engineering apprentice who would later become a member of the board of directors of the Istituto per la Ricostruzione Industriale (IRI), the centerpiece of the corporate state advanced by Fascist dictator Benito Mussolini.

During World War II, Roberto Rocca enlisted in the Italian Navy, serving from June 1942 until September 8, 1943, as a Second Lieutenant in naval engineering on board a submarine. He graduated as mechanical engineer at the Politecnico di Milano in July 1945, though seven months later, the family left Italy for Buenos Aires, Argentina.

His father's new establishment, Techint, prospered during the administration of populist President Juan Perón, and Rocca enrolled at MIT, earning a degree in science at the end of 1949.

Involved in Techint since its initial, 1945 establishment, Rocca served an engineer and in the company's technical department. He was named head of the technical department in 1959, and oversaw the company's expansion into the steel industry. He became General Manager of Techint at the end of 1969, and CEO upon his father's retirement in 1975.

Agostino Rocca died in 1978, leaving his elder son as chairman and CEO. Techint was, by then, a conglomerate with 15,000 employees, two steel manufacturing facilities in Argentina and with international engineering and construction interests. Buffeted by problems in the Argentine economy during the 1980s, Techint expanded its Latin American activities.

Techint participated in the privatization drive adopted by President Carlos Menem in the early 1990s, purchasing a majority stake in Argentina's then-leading steel manufacturer, the state-owned Somisa, in 1992. Techint bids for two electric utilities serving the Buenos Aires area came in second, however.

Rocca converted Somisa into Siderar, and integrated Techint's cold rolled steel operations (for which Somisa had long been a leading supplier, reportedly at a loss to the state concern) into Siderca. Between 1992 and 1996 Siderar raised its share of domestic consumption of flat steel (used in major appliances and the auto industry, among others) from about 56 percent to about 79 percent.

Relinquishing the presidency of Techint to his elder son, Agostino, in 1993, he became president of Siderca in 1996, as well as of Dalmine, a steelmaker based in Bergamo, Italy, acquired in 1996. Rocca embarked on a five-year investment program for Siderar, modernizing operations and shedding unprofitable units. Productivity almost tripled during this period, and costs per ton fell by 28 percent.

Siderar was listed on the Buenos Aires Stock Exchange in 1996. A further joint venture was entered into with Tamsa, in Mexico, and a controlling stake was purchased in SIDOR (the leading steelmaker in Venezuela) in 1998, Confab (Brazil), in 1999, and in NKK (Japan), in 2000, making it the first Japanese steel company in foreign majority ownership. In 1998, Konex Foundation from Argentina, granted him the Diamond Konex Award for Institutions-Community-Enterprizes as the most important businessman in the last decade in his country.

The family was shaken by the April 28, 2001, aviation death of Agostino Rocca, president of Techint and Roberto Rocca's successor. Agostino's younger brother, Paolo Rocca, was appointed to the post. Subsequently, Siderca was listed on the NYSE, and Techint's steel operations, the group's centerpiece, were reorganized as Tenaris in October 2002, basing the subsidiary in Luxembourg and converting Techint into a holding company.

A patron of the arts and philanthropist, Rocca served as Vice President of the Mozarteum Argentino, Honorary President of the Círculo Italiano and Honorary Member of the Institute for Industrial Development (IDI), all prominent non-profit organizations in Argentina. He was elected the first chairman of Tenaris, but died in his native Milan, on June 10, 2003, at the age of 81.

Growing alongside the Argentine economic recovery that followed, Siderca's steel tube shipments grew from 2.5 million tons in 2003 to 4.5 million in 2008.
