= Ipatinga massacre =

Episode of mass murder that took place Ipatinga, Minas Gerais, Brazil in 1963

Ipatinga Massacre
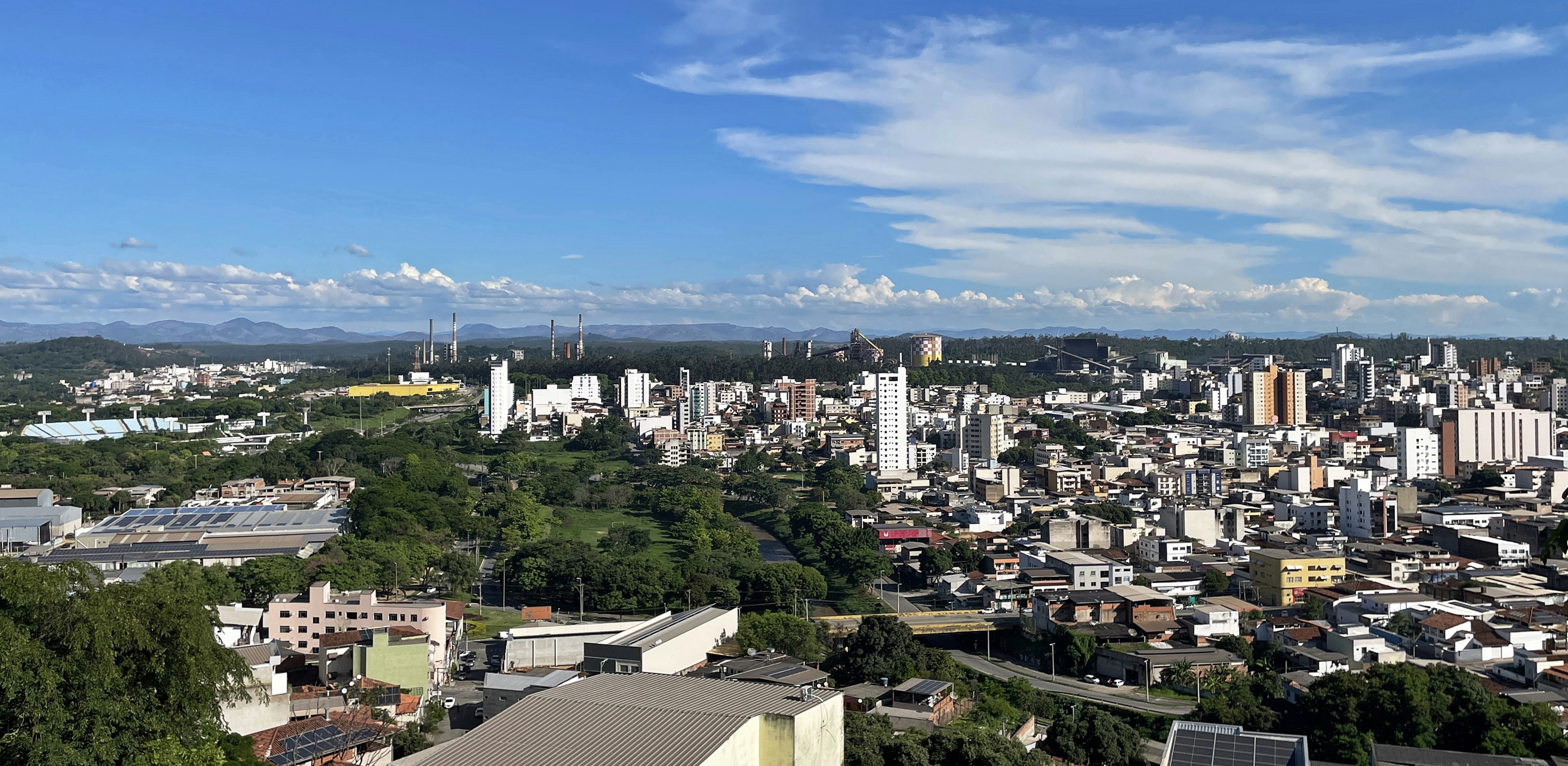
- Partial view of Ipatinga, Minas Gerais, Brazil
- Date: October 7, 1963
- Location: Ipatinga, Minas Gerais, Brazil
- Type: Mass murder, industrial strike
- Cause: Clashes between military police and employees over working conditions and union activities
- Target: Usiminas employees
- Outcome: Eight officially reported dead, 79 wounded; subsequent salary increases, changes in security personnel, and later investigations into the event
- Deaths: 8 (officially reported)
- Injuries: 79

The Ipatinga massacre was an episode of aggression and mass murder that took place in Ipatinga, a Brazilian city that was until then a village belonging to Coronel Fabriciano, in the interior of the state of Minas Gerais, on October 7, 1963. The event consisted of a clash between military officers, then under orders from Governor of Minas Gerais José de Magalhães Pinto, and Usiminas employees, who were outraged at the poor working conditions and the humiliation they suffered when they were searched before entering and leaving the company for their workday.

The night before the day of the massacre, workers leaving the night shift were subjected to a heavy search, in which milk and food could not be taken home. The Military Police had recently discovered plans for resistance and union meetings in the village, which were resisted. Outraged by the facts, workers clashed with the Police Cavalry after trying to break up a gathering in the Santa Monica lodge (now the Horto neighborhood) and only with the intermediation of Avelino Marques, priest of the Church of Our Lady of Hope, was it decided that at dawn there would be a meeting between Usiminas management and representatives of the police, the local union and the workers.

On the morning of the 7th, about six thousand workers on strike in front of the Usiminas gate awaited the end of a meeting, in which it was decided that the police cavalry would be suspended during the investigations into the aggressions of the previous day. At the same time, armed soldiers insisted on remaining at the site and intimidated the rioters, who began to rebuke them with stones and curses. Just as Father Avelino and Geraldo Ribeiro, president of the union, were getting into a car to address the crowd, nineteen policemen on top of a truck started shooting at the workers, officially resulting in eight dead (including a child on his mother's lap) and 79 wounded. Such numbers, however, are contested.

In the following months, there were salary increases, the replacement of the vigilante staff, and the conviction of the soldiers involved in aggression and the massacre. The 1964 Brazilian coup d'état, however, removed then-president João Goulart, initiating the military dictatorship. This culminated in the imprisonment of local trade unionists and labor movement leaders and the acquittal of the police officers involved. Only in 2004 were compensation paid to the families of the victims and in 2013, with the establishment of the National Truth Commission (CNV), the case was investigated again.

== History ==
=== Context ===
Usiminas, a steel mill company installed in the then village of Ipatinga, belonging to the municipality of Coronel Fabriciano, in 1956, brought to the locality, besides the negotiation of land in large quantities, basic infrastructure goods such as health establishments, leisure areas, transportation and communication. Its installation was the result of investments by Japanese businessmen and contributed to the formation of the current Vale do Aço Metropolitan Region, one of the main industrial centers in the state. In the years following its arrival, the company also built entire neighborhoods to serve as shelter for the residents, who were distributed according to the hierarchy of the company; the Castelo neighborhood, for example, was intended for the presidency, while the Cariru neighborhood housed the non-technical employees. In general, the more distant neighborhoods were inhabited by lower class workers.

However, the investments of the State, responsible for 55% of the company's capital – other 5% belonged to national entrepreneurs and 40% to Japanese -, were restricted to the surroundings of the company and took little account of the city of Coronel Fabriciano as a whole, whose administration had exempted Usiminas from taxes. While the population of the entire region was growing due to the industrial activity, also influenced by Aperam South America (located in Timóteo, another village of Coronel Fabriciano), education in the city was precarious, with high dropout rates and illiteracy (over 50%) by the end of the 1950s. In addition, the infrastructure made available by the company was insufficient to meet the demand of workers from the region or who came from different areas of Brazil looking for work, as well as those who were not employed in the industry. In Ipatinga, the lodgings became few and the violence indexes were high.

=== Motivations ===
Usiminas started its operations on October 26, 1962, with about fifteen thousand employees, eight thousand of whom were direct workers and the remaining seven thousand were employed by contractors. The adaptation to the work was difficult, since there were few employees trained to deal with exhausting tasks, close to toxic gases and temperatures that reached 1,700 °C (steel melting temperature), making work accidents common. Besides the precarious transportation, food was also made difficult by the long lines for meals. The restaurants were hierarchical, with distinctions between engineers and workers, the latter forced to face disorganized lines that would start riots at any moment. Relations among the workers were not good either, given the conditions they found themselves in, the cultural differences, and the distance from their families. Outside the company, leisure options were scarce, restricted mainly to small bars.

The president of Usiminas at the time, Amaro Lanari Júnior, notes that "cases of madness began to occur in Ipatinga", as a result of this set of factors. The constant cases of indiscipline led Usiminas to implement control measures with the help of the police, who would begin to interfere in a strict manner even outside the company. Thefts began to occur inside the plant, which encouraged rigorous checks on the workers as they left the work area. The association of social and professional problems and the intransigent interference of the police forces led to dissatisfactions and revolts, but union manifestations were also repudiated and punished by the police. Affiliations to the Metalworkers Union of Coronel Fabriciano, which then represented the company's workers, were vetoed.

There is even a report of about two hundred employees who were registered as operators, but in practice were used to supervise the actions of workers both internally and externally. Sometimes security teams monitored employees in bars or in the streets of Ipatinga and, in case of suspicious attitudes, they communicated them to Usiminas' management to decide whether to remove or fire the worker. The Department of Political and Social Order (DAOPS) of Minas Gerais, which acted as a kind of intelligence service for Governor José de Magalhães Pinto, also had infiltration among the employees, as did the Brazilian Army, which feared that President João Goulart would establish a unionist republic.

=== The trigger ===
In early October 1963, undercover security forces reported to Usiminas the possibility of rising worker impatience and recommended that the company cancel plans such as the creation of a union controlled by itself and the mass dismissal of revolting leaders. At the same time, a secret union among the workers was also denounced. Another notification made was that representatives of the General Workers Command (CGT), through the President and unionist João Goulart, would have been in Ipatinga between October 4 and 6. At first, this visit would have taken place to gain influence from Belgo-Mineira workers in the region for that company's strike in São Paulo, but in the Army's view the General Workers Command was seeking support for the Usiminas cause among Belgo-Mineira and Aperam South America employees. On October 4, João Goulart had asked Congress to decree a state of siege throughout the country, in view of the country's economic and social situation in the face of union and political maneuvers.

On the afternoon of October 6, a Sunday, the first meeting of the Metalworkers Union of Coronel Fabriciano in Ipatinga took place, called after aggressions against workers for frivolous reasons, including crowd control and minor disagreements. Many accusations were made against Usiminas' security forces and it had been said by Geraldo Ribeiro, president of the union, that the authorities would be made aware and measures would be demanded of the company. There were, however, Usiminas representatives infiltrated. When they were informed of the assembly, the company's security service began to reinforce the police to demoralize the resistance that same night.

On the night of October 6, around 10:15 pm, trucks carrying workers away were stopped by security guards near the company's gate for a search. The workers' lunch boxes were opened and liters of milk were spilled. Every day, the workers were entitled to a bag with 250 ml of milk and a French roll, which were often taken home and shared with the family. It was raining that night and there was a riot, resulting in some workers being trampled by the horses of the soldiers covering the action. At the end of the inspection, before the truck continued with the workers, there were cries that the Central Office would be destroyed.

Around 11 pm, an electrician was attacked by police forces after a group close to him resisted orders to dissolve a gathering of people in the Santa Monica (now Horto neighborhood) lodge. Acquaintances of the electrician fought back with kicks and arms and managed to restrain the security guards, who left but promised to take revenge. Fearing new police attacks, the residents of Santa Monica improvised barricades with furniture and drums. Some armed themselves with sticks and iron. At first there were no plans to attack the police forces, only to defend themselves. The confrontation had been alerted to Robson Zamprogno, special delegate of the Ipatinga village and Cavalry Captain, who had been informed that the situation was out of control and needed reinforcement. According to statements of those involved in the police investigation, the arrival of the cavalry, shortly before midnight, would have culminated in dozens of beatings, home invasions, and people shot, among residents and police officers both in Santa Monica and in the nearby Chicago Bridge housing. About three hundred people were arrested. Later, the power was cut off.

=== Conciliation attempt ===
Around 2 am of October 7, the police took Avelino Marques, the priest of the Church of Our Lady of Hope, to the Santa Monica lodge. Captain Robson Zamprogno asked him to go to the workers and ask them what they wanted and to demand the presence of representatives. The priest said he would go on condition that they put down their weapons, and so he did, heading towards the rebels when he was illuminated by a CEMIG truck. The religious asked that the soldiers withdraw and the 300 detainees be released, which in fact occurred, and it was agreed that a commission would appear at the Usiminas Central Office together with Robson and Father Avelino at dawn. He would spend the rest of the morning with the workers. In the company's ambulatory, the injured were being treated.

In view of these events and in anticipation of the commission's meeting with the company's management, a crowd of about 1,500 workers formed shortly before 5 am near the gate, blocking access and inciting strikes. The arrival of more workers led to riots, while others encouraged depredations. The police were notified by the guard service and would send as much effort as possible, but would be limited because Aperam South America was also on strike in Timóteo. Father Avelino insisted to the police lieutenant that the movement was peaceful, but as other trucks with workers arrived, the disorder increased. The soldiers with guns on display were instructed by Captain Robson Zamprogno not to kill and not to shoot.

At 7 am, Geraldo Ribeiro arrived at the gate, called to the meeting at the Central Office. Despite the commotion, the union leader asked the lieutenant to withdraw his troops, but his request was denied. At this point, José Isabel do Nascimento, a contractor's foreman, was photographing the crowd from the top of a gate. The flashes of his camera drew attention, even from the police, who felt uncomfortable. The meeting with the board of directors started at 7:30 am and in its course a series of attacks and counterattacks were made between the union and Captain Robson. The union president and Father Avelino proposed to remove the cavalry from Ipatinga, responsible for street policing, but this request was denied by the company and rebuked by Robson. At the same time, the number of workers at the gate exceeded six thousand. The early morning rain brought a lot of mud and dirt to the site.

=== Massacre ===
The meeting came to an end around 9:15 am, and it was agreed between the parts that the cavalry would be suspended from street policing until the investigations into the attacks of the previous morning had been completed. Captain Robson had also demanded that the troops leave without booing, which Geraldo Ribeiro had promised to try to do, but this would be almost impossible with the thousands of protesters in front of the gate, who were cursing and throwing stones at the soldiers who insisted on remaining armed. Just as Father Avelino and Geraldo were getting into a car to go towards the crowd, the sound of shots fired at the rioters began to be heard. Robson, upon hearing the shots, immediately got into a jeep and drove toward the soldiers, asking them to stop without barely being heard.

There were 19 military police officers were shooting at workers from the top of a truck. José Isabel do Nascimento was shooting at the military at the moment he was shot by a revolver, and was taken to the Santa Terezinha Hospital (in the center of Ipatinga) and died on October 17. When the shooting stopped, a great movement of vehicles and ambulances filled with wounded people immediately started towards the Santa Terezinha Hospital and the Siderúrgica Hospital in downtown Coronel Fabriciano. Geraldo Ribeiro, Father Avelino, and other members of the meeting arrived in time to see only the mutilated bodies and men agonizing for help, and the workers' belongings and lunch boxes scattered all over the place, coming to their aid after remaining paralyzed for a short time after 15 minutes of shooting. Robson remained for a while crying in the jeep, lamenting with another officer about what his team had done.

In the Central Office, some employees became ill due to nervousness and were taken to the ambulatory. Geraldo Ribeiro tried to calm everyone down. The arrival of a troop coming from the Governador Valadares Battalion incited the workers again, due to the threat made by some soldiers, who were restrained by Lieutenant Xavier. The union leader also determined that the workers should not attack. Xavier, finding Captain Robson in tears, determined that he would organize the defense on the spot. A little later, Geraldo contacted the Secretary of Security in Belo Horizonte to disclose the occurrence to the press. The then mayor of Belo Horizonte, Cyro Cotta Poggiali, arrived at the scene of the massacre at lunchtime in a truck loaded with drinking water and food. At 1 pm, Captain Jacinto Franco do Amaral, who had come from Governador Valadares at Xavier's request to take over Ipatinga's policing temporarily, arrived by train on the Vitória-Minas Railway.

=== Victims ===
Officially, the massacre ended with eight deaths and 79 wounded, but these numbers are contested, since there are many reports from family members of possible victims who were not accounted for, especially children who lost their father. Sources indicate thirty deaths while others as many as eighty. Father Abdala Jorge, from Timóteo, claims to have counted eleven bodies in a hospital in the region. In a Timóteo carpentry shop twelve coffins were ordered, but a former Usiminas employee claims to have picked up 32 at the company's request in Belo Horizonte the following day. In a 2006 interview, Geraldo Ribeiro said that on the day of the massacre he saw four bodies lying on the ground before he went to Timóteo to contact the Security Department and when he returned about 30 minutes later there were no bodies. He also claimed, decades later, to have received a letter from Usiminas stating that 59 employees were fired for not returning to work thirty days after the event.

An inquiry opened the day after the massacre indicated that at least four bodies were thrown into the Ipanema river, killed in a shootout. Daniel Miranda Soares narrates in his article "O Massacre de Ipatinga" in the CEAS' magazine nº 64 of 1979 that more than three thousand people were wounded and 33 would have died by the following day as a result of their injuries. Among the eight deaths are José Isabel do Nascimento, the only one to photograph the massacre; the three-month-old girl Ângela Eliane Martins, who was shot in the arms of her mother Antonieta Francisca da Conceição Martins, who was taking her to the Usiminas outpatient clinic; five other industrial workers (Gilson Miranda, Aides Dias de Carvalho, Antônio José dos Reis, Alvino Ferreira Felipe, and Sebastião Tomé da Silva) and a tailor (Geraldo Rocha Gualberto).

== Impacts and investigations ==
Guarani radio station was the first to announce the massacre, reporting that there were seven deaths and dozens wounded. Within 24 hours, there were national and international repercussions. The Legislative Assembly of Minas Gerais (ALMG) began investigations on October 8, opening a Commission of Inquiry. On this day, representatives of the governor, Usiminas and unions, Cyro Cotta Poggiali, Massilon Resende Teixeira (Coronel Fabriciano Village Judge) and Orlando Milanez (village attorney) met in Ipatinga. Geraldo Ribeiro demanded that the involved police officers be punished, which Military police Commander General José Geraldo de Oliveira, who also arrived in the village on the 8th, guaranteed would happen. On the same day, the colonel opened a police investigation. There was a rebellion in the village for the next three days after the episode, where, besides the strike, the Usiminas surveillance guardhouse, the police station, the public jail, and the truck used for the shootings were destroyed.

Another point defended by the unionist was the withdrawal of the Military Police from Ipatinga and local policing by the Army, but this was impractical for Magalhães Pinto. The governor could not allow the state police to be replaced by national forces, led by president and political rival João Goulart, and would not be well regarded if there was a bad repercussion of the Military Police regarding the killings. The inquiry opened against the 19 police officers involved in the October 7 massacre was closed on November 4, 1963, and a second one, involving the aggressions against the workers the day before, was delivered on November 29. The Usiminas workers obtained a wage increase and a guarantee of freedom for the union leaders. In February 1964 they staged a new strike, unsuccessfully demanding a new raise. The company's security staff was also replaced.

Policing on the streets of Ipatinga was reduced, but the growing crime rate made a demand for police officers. An elite group of Military Police prepared in Belo Horizonte arrived in the village at the end of 1963. There was still a resistance against the presence of military in some quarters, but at the suggestion of Father Avelino, the officers brought a music band that managed to bring the population closer to the security forces. In Santa Monica the resistance lasted longer, and only on March 10, 1964, after a shootout among residents, the police forced an action under the presence of Geraldo Ribeiro. In the following years Usiminas accelerated the construction of new residential neighborhoods, since until 1963 about 60% lived in precarious conditions. Human resources actions and the implementation of social assistance policies minimized labor relations conflicts.

== Subversion and compensation ==
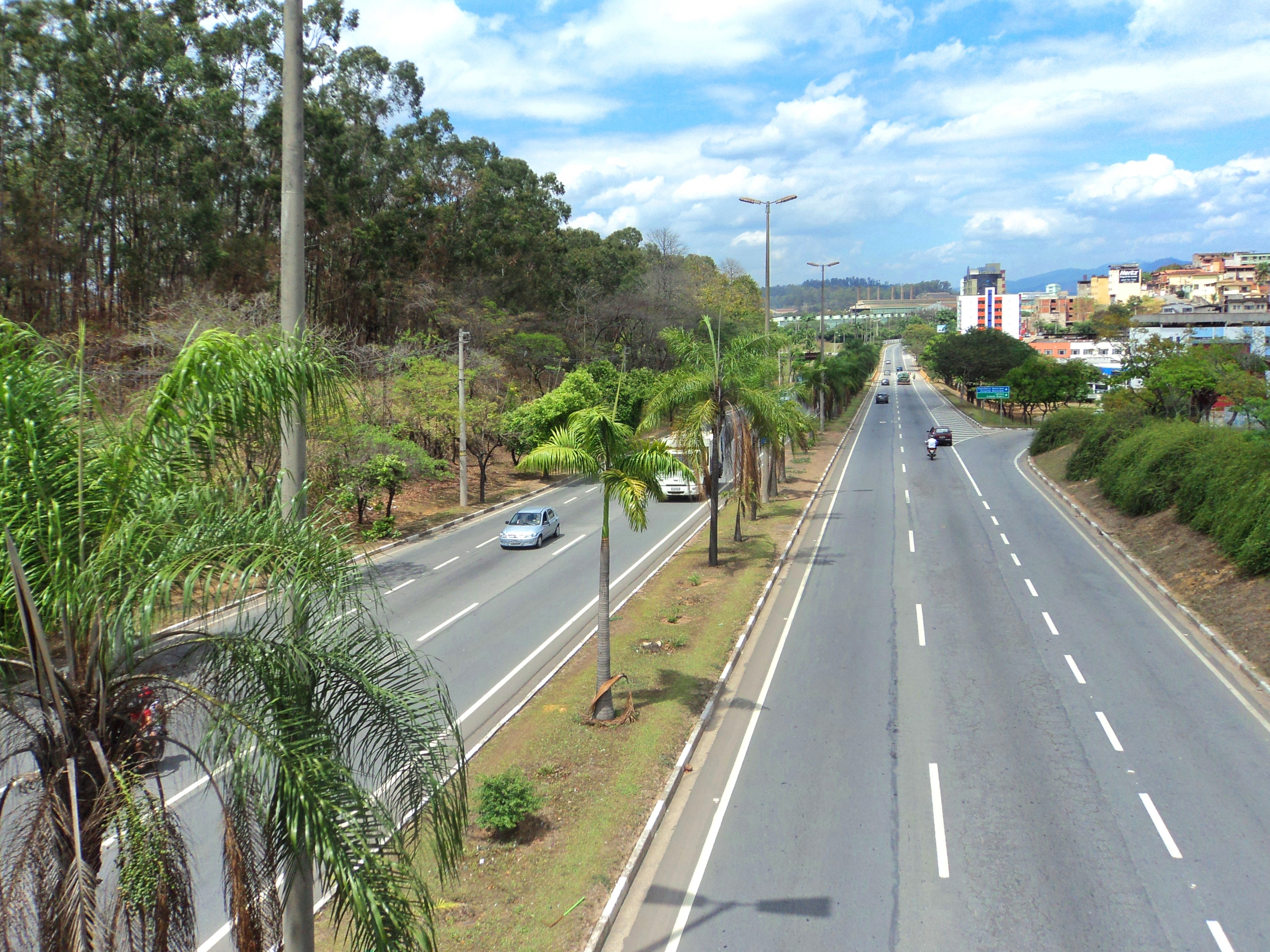
The Pedro Linhares Gomes Avenue with the Usiminas in the background, in Ipatinga, Minas Gerais, Brazil. The municipality was emancipated from Coronel Fabriciano six months after the massacre.

The coup d'état on March 31, 1964 overthrew then-President João Goulart, beginning the military dictatorship in Brazil. This culminated, in the first days of the following month, in the arrest of union members and leaders of the Santa Monica lodge. Geraldo Ribeiro was not arrested for having collaborated with the police entry in Santa Mônica, but he was notified on June 9 that he would be removed from his position as a union leader. Ipatinga and Timóteo were emancipated from Coronel Fabriciano on April 29, 1964, under the influence of the massacre and political disagreements between the mayor of Coronel Fabriciano Cyro Cotta Poggiali and Governor José de Magalhães Pinto, who until recently were allies. This alliance had led Magalhães Pinto to veto the dismemberment of the villages in December 1962. In July 1964, the Metalworkers Union of Coronel Fabriciano was taken over by the military to give rise to the Union of Metalworkers of Ipatinga (Sindipa) on May 1, 1965, founded in the presence of President Castelo Branco.

On March 8, 1965, all the police officers involved in the massacre were acquitted, claiming to be acting in self-defense. On February 29, 1964, the presidency of Usiminas in Belo Horizonte had been informed by the board in Ipatinga that there was a plan to blow up the company, which in fact, according to reports, was cogitated by some radical workers during the strike that month, but this idea was fought by the majority and by the union since the company was the only source of income for many families. This sketch was used as a strong argument in favor of the military and against the workers, however several information seen as uncertain would have been taken into consideration during the investigations, such as the unconfirmed presence of union leaders in the conflicts of the night before the slaughter. The Military Prosecution filed an appeal against the decision on May 7, 1965, but the case was concluded in favor of the military on December 10.

Despite the repression, in the mid-1980s the first demonstrations against the massacre took place. In 1984, there was a protest organized by twelve institutions, including unions, community associations, the Workers Pastoral and the Workers' Party (PT). In 1987, a demonstration was organized by the Cultural Society Sete de Outubro (SC-7), created with the objective of gathering and preserving information about the massacre. After the end of the military dictatorship in Brazil, in 1985, law no. 9.140, approved on December 4, 1995, would be the first to provide compensation to relatives of people killed or disappeared during the military regime. This decree gave the families of the victims of the massacre the right to compensation, but the law only covered those who died in "police facilities". In March 2004, the approval of Provisional Measure 176 also guaranteed compensation to families of those who died in public demonstrations or armed conflicts. Based on this project, only on October 7, 2004, the first process of compensation for the massacre (of the tailor Geraldo Gualberto's family) was approved by the Federal Government's Commission of the Dead and Disappeared. At the end of the same month, four other families were compensated.

Although the number of deaths has always been questioned, only five families claimed compensation in 2004, against eight official deaths. That year, the Citizen Support Center (CAC), a sector of the Ipatinga City Council, encouraged family members to seek compensation. On October 7, 2013, on the fiftieth anniversary of the massacre – coincidentally also on a rainy Monday in the city – victims and relatives were heard by the National Truth Commission (CNV) in a public hearing at the Ipatinga Forum with the aim of gathering information about the episode. A report released by the National Truth Commission in December 2014 included three names of workers who can be considered victims of the military action and pointed to the state governor at the time of the massacre as being responsible for the action.

== Cultural influences ==
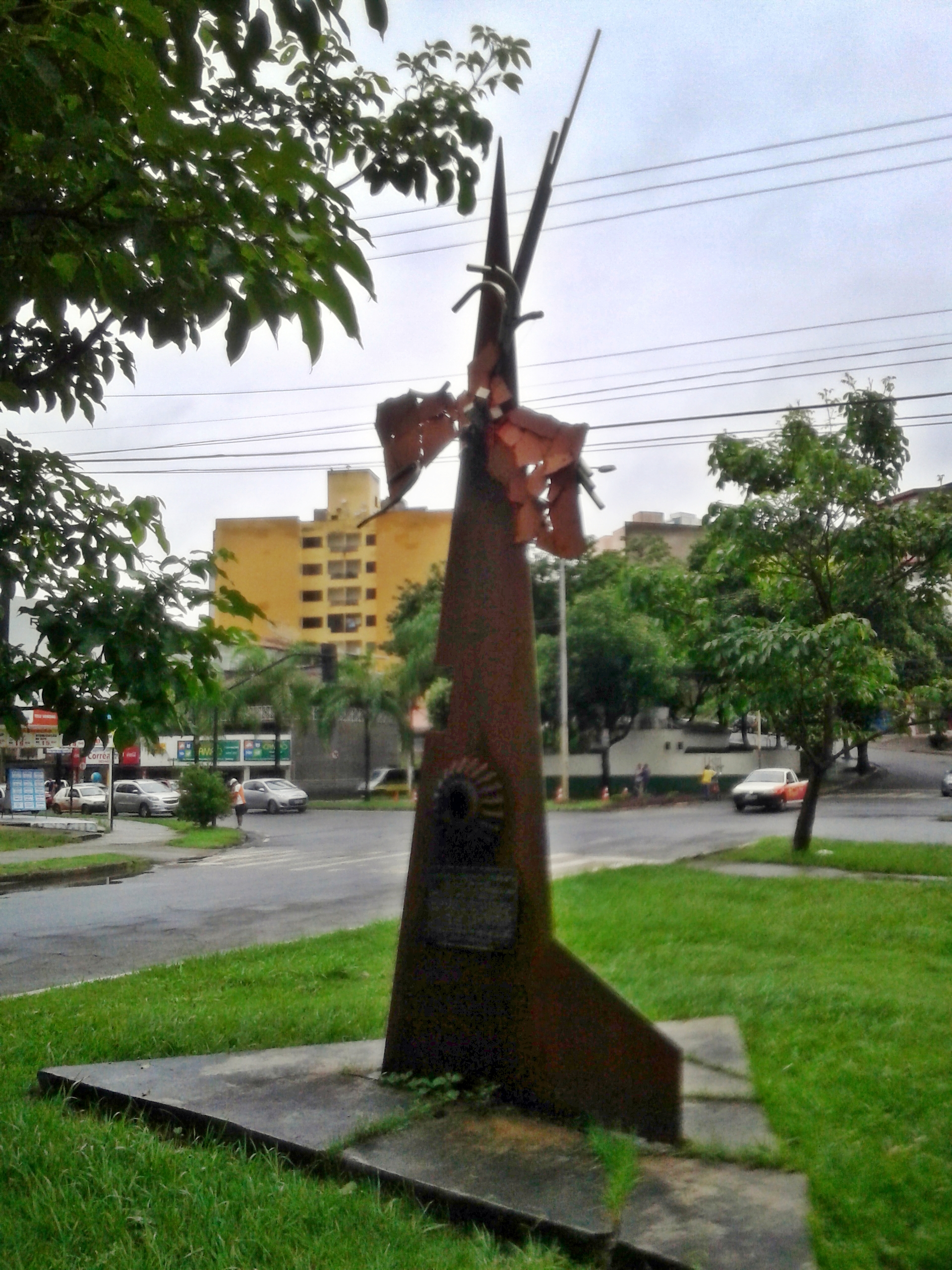
View of the "Monumento 7 de Outubro" (7 October Monument), in Ipatinga, Minas Gerais, Brazil. It's a tribute to the victims of the Ipatinga's massacre, occurred on 7 October 1963.

The anniversary of the massacre is remembered every year in Ipatinga with tributes and demonstrations in memory of the victims. On October 7, 1989, on the occasion of the 26th anniversary of the episode, the Metalworkers Union of Ipatinga inaugurated the "7 de Outubro" Monument, which is located in the Bom Retiro neighborhood and reveres the deceased workers. Near the massacre site, where currently stands a cloverleaf between the roads of Avenida Pedro Linhares Gomes (a stretch of BR-381 that cuts through Ipatinga), Usiminas installed the Tomie Ohtake Monument, which was created by Japanese-Brazilian artist Tomie Ohtake in April 2004 and is composed of two interacting "C's". The projector, however, does not define a meaning for the work and leaves the observer a free interpretation. On October 17, 2013, the Amnesty Commission of the Ministry of Justice inaugurated the "Monument to the Resistance and Struggle of Workers" at the Bible Square (Praça da Bíblia in Portuguese), in the center of Ipatinga, as well as in nine other Brazilian cities where there were political persecuted by the military regime. During the 1990s, after the privatization of Usiminas, investments in art and cultural equipment were intensified to maintain its credibility in the face of the events of the past.

The name of the Cultural Sports Center Sete de Outubro, located in the Veneza neighborhood, refers to the day of the massacre, while the Ipatinga's City Hospital is called Hospital e Municipal Emergency Room Eliane Martins, in reference to the three-month-old girl who died after being shot in her mother's arms. Public hearings in the City Council are also held to remember the massacre on the occasion of its anniversary in some years. A number of periodicals are dedicated to gathering and disseminating information about the episode, such as the work Massacre de Ipatinga: Quadro a Quadro (Ipatinga Massacre: Frame by Frame), written by journalist Edvaldo Fernandes based on interviews, documents, and periodicals and presented during the II Public Call of the Marks of Memory Project, of the Amnesty Commission of the Ministry of Justice in 2011; the book Massacre de Ipatinga: myths and truths, by the historian of Ipatinga Marilene Tuler (2007), which describes the social context in which the workers found themselves in parallel to the events at Usiminas and the country's political-economic situation; and The Massacre of Ipatinga, by Carlindo Marques (1984).

== See also ==
- List of massacres in Brazil

== Bibliography ==
- Soares, Daniel Miranda (1979). "O Massacre de Ipatinga". Cadernos do CEAS. 64.
- Romerito Valeriano da Silva; Duval Magalhães Fernandes; Elisângela Gonçalves Lacerda (2012). "Análise da Dinâmica Populacional na Região Metropolitana e no Colar Metropolitano do Vale do Aço (MG) entre 1970 e 2010" (PDF). Associação Brasileira de Estudos Populacionais. Archived from the original (PDF) on 2014-01-10.
- Centro Universitário Católica do Leste de Minas Gerais (Unileste) (2014). "Região Metropolitana do Vale do Aço – diagnóstico final (volume 1)" (PDF). Plano Diretor de Desenvolvimento Integrado. 1: 1–269. Archived from the original (PDF) on 2016-03-03.
- Farias, Rita de Cássia Pereira (2010). "Entre a igualdade e a distinção: a trama social de uma grande empresa". Instituto de Filosofia e Ciências Humanas.
- Fernandes, Edvaldo (2013). "Massacre de Ipatinga Quadro a Quadro" (PDF). Massacre de Ipatinga Quadro a Quadro. Archived from the original (PDF) on 2016-01-31.
- Rocha, Marcelo de Freitas Assis (2010). "Não foi por acaso: a história dos trabalhadores que construíram a Usiminas e morreram no Massacre de Ipatinga" (PDF). Não foi por acaso: A história dos trabalhadores que construíram a Usiminas e morreram no Massacre de Ipatinga.
- Sampaio, Aparecida Pires (2008). "A produção social do espaço urbano de Ipatinga-MG: da luta sindical à luta urbana" (PDF). Universidade Candido Mendes. Archived from the original (PDF) on 2016-01-27.
