= McRoskey Mattress Company =

- Legendary Service. Unmatched Quality
- Company type: Privately held company
- Industry: Mattresses and Box-springs
- Founded: 1899 in San Francisco, CA, USA

The McRoskey Mattress Company is a handmade mattress making firm founded in San Francisco, CA. Established by two brothers in October 1899, it has been trading continuously ever since, including during the aftermath of the San Francisco earthquake of 1906. The company operates out of their "flagship showroom" at 2233 Alameda St. in San Francisco.

== History ==
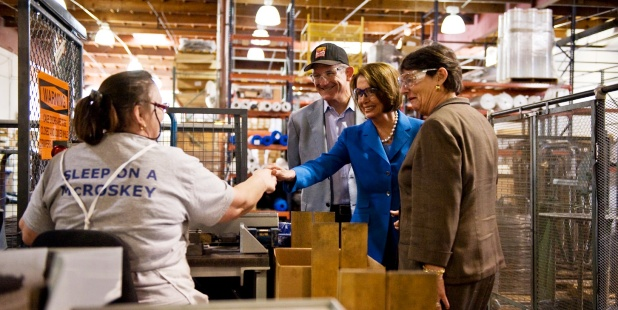
Congresswoman Pelosi greets employees of McRoskey Mattress Company in 2010.

The company was founded by Edward and Leonard McRoskey at the intersection of Harrison and 16th Street. Originally, they had arrived in San Francisco as salesmen for a Chicago based engineering firm, hoping to sell mattress making equipment to other manufacturers. Instead, the McRoskeys decided to set up business for themselves as manufacturers of handmade mattresses.

Seven years later, the city was hit by the earthquake and in the wake of the fire that followed, the company was the only manufacturer of mattresses to survive. As such, its products were in much demand by the inhabitants.

In the 1920s, the two brothers became competitors: Leonard continued to operate McRoskey & Co. while Edward opened his store at 1506 Market Street under the name of Edward L. McRoskey Mattress Company. In 1925, Edward built a new factory and showroom at 1687 Market Street. He was very forward-thinking with the building's construction and design; it was built out of reinforced concrete to help withstand future earthquakes. In 1929, Edward's brother Leonard died, and his business was closed.

On May 1, 1931, Edward L. McRoskey filed for his first patent for the McRoskey Tufting Machine, designed to help make the tufts stronger and requiring less needle work from the mattress makers. He later refined the process, and invented a button threading machine that added buttons to mattress tufts. Additionally, he improved tufting even further by inventing a hand tool to be used for tufting, eliminating the need for a long upholstery needle and increasing the resiliency and springiness of the premium mattresses.

Demolition permits for the building were filed in July 2025, with a plan to build a 17-storey affordable housing complex. The building has since been demolished as of February 17 2026.

== Ownership ==
Shortly after the move to Market and Gough, the second generation of McRoskey's, Leonard and Robert, who are Edward's sons, joined the firm. Robin, Robert's daughter, joined the family business in 1981.

In 2018, McRoskey split its manufacturing and retail businesses, and sold its manufacturing arm to Pleasant Mattress Company. Robin continued to head the firm as CEO of McRoskey Mattress Company – Retail and act as Brand Ambassador until her retirement in 2022.

Ownership and operation of the McRoskey Mattress Company was handed over to Vanessa Contreras, a long-time employee of the company, after Robin's retirement.
