= Steeluniversity.org =

Undergraduate curriculum in iron and steel making

steeluniversity
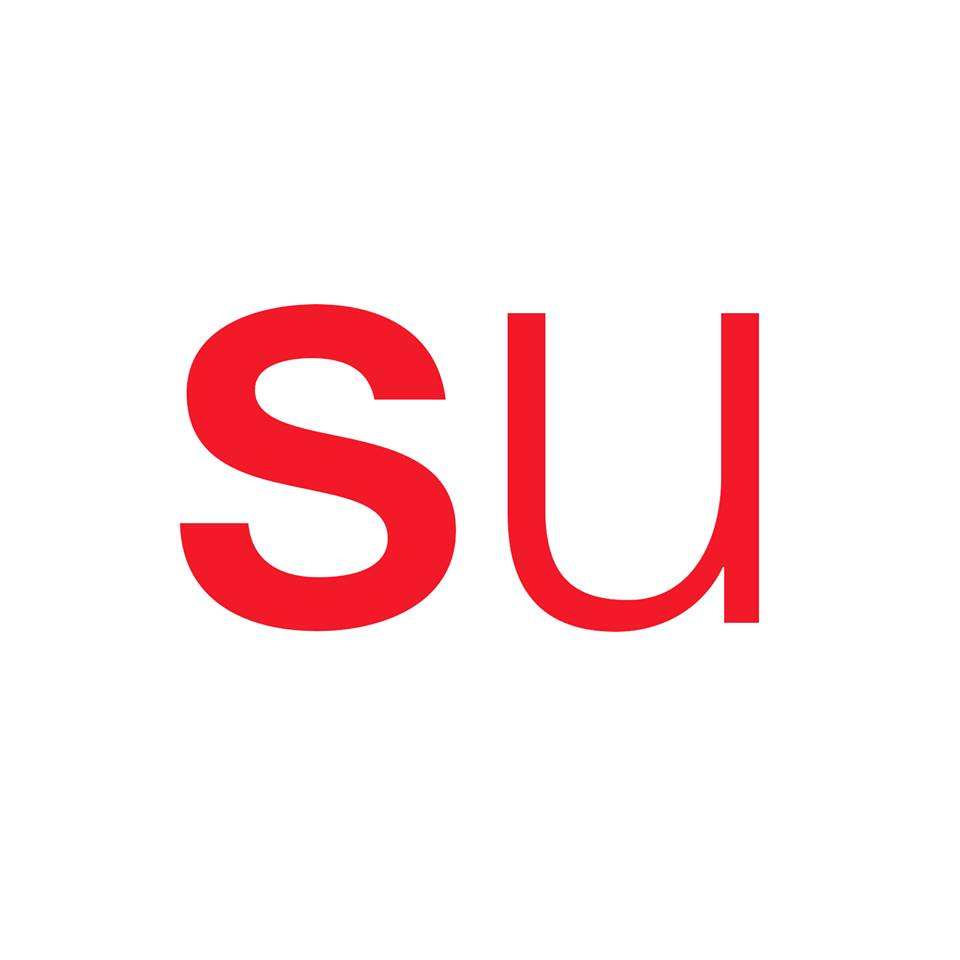
- Website type: E-learning
- Available in: English, Spanish, Chinese (traditional & simplified), Korean, Russian, German
- Owner: World Steel Association
- Creators: World Steel Association, MATTER (computer-based learning project), SteelMATTER, University of Liverpool
- Website: https://steeluniversity.org/
- Commercial: Non-profit
- Registration: Optional
- Launched: October 2003
- Current status: Online

steeluniversity is a collection of free and non-free e-learning resources and interactive simulations covering major aspects of ironmaking and steelmaking. It provides the underlying scientific, metallurgical, and engineering principles and environmental aspects of the production, use, and recycling of steel. These internet-delivered resources are aimed at undergraduate students of metallurgy, materials science and engineering subjects as well as graduate employees in the steel industry supply chain.

== Objectives ==
The basic objective of steeluniversity.org is to inform university students and their teachers about steel technologies and to attract young people to the global steel industry. Another major aim is to reduce the cost of in-service training at steel companies by providing them with freely available training and professional development material. In view of the decline in metallurgy-related courses in universities and the retirement of professors and steel industry experts, it aims to sustain knowledge of ferrous metallurgy by joint efforts of academia and the steel industry.

== Background ==
A gradual decline in the number of students enrolling in science subjects such as physics and mathematics can be seen in many industrialized countries. This phenomenon has been indicated in several studies. The OECD (Organisation for Economic Co-operation and Development) Global Science Forum reports in a study that the relative share of science and technology graduates declined in 10 out of 16 member countries between 1993 and 2003. Metallurgy is one of the most affected disciplines in this trend in terms of available courses, overall enrolments and the number of graduates. An important factor relating to this change in US universities is described as transformation in the late twentieth century of metallurgy departments into 'material sciences' departments. A similar pattern in other Western European countries e.g. in the UK is reported during the same time span. The steel industry, once an attractive career destination for metallurgy graduates is directly affected by these changes and now faces the challenge of replacing the retiring work force. The idea of preserving knowledge of metallurgy and attracting young people toward career in the steel industry was born out of this challenge.

== History ==
In response to the declining skilled workforce in the steel industry, the World Steel Association (formerly International Iron and Steel Institute (IISI)) took the initiative by creating a collection of web-based e-learning resources on metallurgy in a pilot project named Internet Learning of Steel Applications and Processes (ILSAP). Initially two introductory modules; Secondary Steelmaking and Steel for Automotive Applications were launched in partnership with the MATTER project at the University of Liverpool on 1 August 2002 Following the success of the pilot project, the board of governors approved a budget of €2.5 million for development of an extensive set of e-learning resources and the project was renamed steeluniversity.org in October 2003.

== E-learning resources ==
The e-learning modules on the website cover major aspects of iron and steelmaking in four categories:

Steel applications

- Automotive
- Construction
- Engineering Steels
- Offshore
- Packaging

Steel processing

- Process Route Overview
- Basic Oxygen Steelmaking
- Electric Arc Furnace
- Secondary Steelmaking
- Continuous Casting
- Hot Rolling
- Heat Treatment of Steel

Ferrous metallurgy

- Thermodynamics and Kinetics
- Mechanical Properties
- Strengthening Mechanisms

Sustainability

- Steel and the Environment
- Life-Cycle Assessment
- Environmental Management

=== Steel applications ===
The modules in this section address the selection of steels for various steel markets, such as automotive, construction, engineering, and offshore applications. Acting as the materials advisor in a multidisciplinary team, the user aims to select suitable steel in order to satisfy design specifications for a particular application. The major engineering design equations are studied during this process in order to select and compare the performance of steel and other metals and materials.

4-D Process Overview of a Steel Plant

EAF Steelmaking simulation

Secondary Steelmaking simulation

=== Steel processing ===
This section contains a series of interactive simulations of major steelmaking processes from raw materials, basic oxygen steelmaking (BOS) and electric arc furnace (EAF) steelmaking, secondary steelmaking, continuous casting, and hot rolling. Different steel grades can be processed using two levels of operation which are suitable for students and graduates in the industry. The 'student level' provides a basic functionality enabling the user to understand and control the process principles without too many operational complications, whereas the 'industry level' has advanced functionality and the user needs to deal with practical disturbances that are not anticipated in advance. Real-time feedback is given on the composition and quality of the steel, on process time and temperature and incurred costs, to allow the process to be optimized. A user guide and more conventional supporting e-learning units are also available within each module to enable the learner to better understand the reactions. For example, in the secondary steelmaking module, there are sections on deoxidation, desulfurization, decarburization, and dehydrogenation.

=== Ferrous metallurgy ===
The section on ferrous metallurgy contains modules on thermodynamics and kinetics, including strengthening mechanisms, phase transformation, recrystallisation and grain growth, heat treatment, and steel properties. An introduction is provided on steel specifications, with exercises to ensure that they can be accurately interpreted. The learner can check mechanical properties of a given grade of steel by conducting virtual tensile, Charpy impact, and hardness tests as well.

=== Sustainability ===
This section introduces the environmental aspects of steelmaking, usage and recycling processes. The learner gets a basic idea of Life Cycle Thinking and the method of life-cycle assessment (LCA), and its practical application. In addition selected LCA scenarios facing the steel industry and its customers in the automotive and construction sectors can be explored.

== Available languages ==
The e-learning modules were initially only available in English. Currently, several modules can be found in several languages, such as Spanish, Chinese (traditional & simplified), Korean, Russian, and German. The process of translation is not yet complete and a number of modules are in various stages of proofreading.

== steelChallenge ==
The steelChallenge is an annual competition organized by steeluniversity.org for students and steel industry employees. Using one or more of the steelmaking simulations on the steeluniversity.org website, the entrants are to produce a particular steel grade at the lowest cost. The competition runs for a 24-hour period during which multiple attempts are allowed. Awards are given for the best, one for the best industry entry and the other for the best university entry. Other local prizes sponsored by steel companies are also presented at the event.
