= Giuseppe Rocca =

Italian luthier

Giuseppe Rocca (27 April 1807 – 27 January 1865) was an Italian violin maker of the 19th century.

Rocca's preferred models were the 1742 Alard Guarneri and the 1716 Messiah Strad. His instruments are appreciated today and are considered better than those made by his son Enrico Rocca.

Rocca was born in Barbaresco, a small village in the Langhe hills near Alba in Piemonte, and died in Genoa.

His parents were Maria Teresa and Giovanni Battista Rocca. He was educated and served in the military and soon after married Anna Maria Calizzano. At the time, Rocca was a baker. The circumstances are unknown what brought him, in a few years, to take up an apprenticeship in Giovanni Francesco Pressenda's Turin workshop.

By 1834, his wife died, and he moved to Turin to pursue his craft. It was during this time that he became acquainted with Luigi Tarisio, a violin dealer, who had in his possession the Alard and the Messiah. These then became the models Rocca used for his violins.

He remarried. His second wife, Caterina Barone, died in 1842. Rocca remarried a third time to Giuseppina Quarelli. They had three children, one of whom was Enrico, born in 1847. In 1850, Rocca's third wife died.

Rocca moved to Genoa in pursuit of opportunities after the Guadagnini workshop became the clear favourite in Turin. For years, he continued his work in both Turin and Genoa.

He married a fourth time and was widowed. He earned a reputation as a drunk, and his production became inconsistent in quality. In 1856, Rocca married a fifth time to Filomena DeFranchi.

Rocca was found dead one night in January 1865 in a well in the gardens of Pila, Genoa, near the Bisagno river.

His work became celebrated and well appreciated a few decades after his death. His production was consistent on the violins, violas, cellos, double basses, and guitars he made.

According to a few paper documents and the two copper and silver medals, Rocca won prizes in his craft at national arts and crafts exhibitions in 1844 and 1846. It's written: ‘Rocca Giuseppe violin maker, gives notice to gentlemen amateurs and professors of music that after exhaustive experiments, (he) was able to find the secret of the composition of the varnish used by the ancient (masters) Stradivarius and Guarnerius.’
