= Enrico Rocca =

Italian violin maker (1847–1915)

Enrico Rocca (21 April 1847 in Turin – 9 June 1915 in Genova) was an Italian violin maker of the 19th and 20th Centuries and son of Giuseppe Rocca.

Although he worked differently from his father Giuseppe Rocca, Enrico's work takes more inspiration from Eugenio Praga.

== Biography ==
Enrico Rocca was the son of Giuseppe, who is considered probably the most important maker of the 19th century; Enrico had a very hard life, and he wasn't trained properly by his father. The loss of his father at the age of 19 forced him to run away from his family. He ended up working as a boatman, a sailor, a ship carpenter (for many years) and a woodworker. He opened his workshop in 1878.

After twenty years passed on the docks of the port of Genova, he began violin making building mainly six strings lombard mandolins and guitars; he started making violins only after 1890. By the turn of the century and after Praga's death (1901), Enrico Rocca became the pre-eminent violin maker in Genoa. His work is always dominated by a great spontaneity and reveals a strong personality. He was consistent in his production as well as style till his death.

His preferred models were Guarneri, Stradivari and Amati. Enrico Rocca's instruments are much appreciated today.

== Quotes ==
"There’s no evidence of pupils, but it seems highly likely that Eugenio Praga had occasionally relied on the collaboration of Enrico Rocca, since there are many similarities in their technique and in the models used." - Alberto Giordano
