= Tenaris =

Manufacturer of steel pipes

Tenaris S.A.
- Type: Société Anonyme
- Traded as: BIT: TEN; NYSE: TS; BMV: TS; FTSE MIB
- Industry: Oilfield services
- Founded: 17 December 2001; 24 years ago
- Headquarters: Luxembourg City, Luxembourg
- Area served: Worldwide
- Key people: Paolo Rocca (Chairman) Gabriel Podskubka (CEO)
- Products: Steel pipes
- Revenue: ▼US$11.981 billion (2025)
- Operating income: ▼US$2.283 billion (2025)
- Net income: ▼US$1.973 billion (2025)
- Total assets: ▼US$20.072 billion (2025)
- Total equity: ▲US$16.829 billion (2025)
- Owner: Techint (64.37%)
- Number of employees: 25,000 (2025)
- Website: tenaris.com

Tenaris S.A., organized in Luxembourg, is a manufacturer and supplier of steel pipes and related services for the petroleum industry. The company produces and ships over 4 million tons of pipes annually. In 2024, sales to customers in North America accounted for 46% of sales, compared with 19% in South America, 26% in Asia-Pacific, and 10% in Europe.

Tenaris is controlled by Techint and holds minority interests in Ternium, Usiminas, and Techgen. Its shares are listed on the New York Stock Exchange, Borsa Italiana, and the Mexican Stock Exchange, and are included in the FTSE MIB index.

== History ==
Tenaris traces its roots to the formation of Siderca, the sole Argentine producer of seamless steel pipe products by the predecessor of San Faustin in 1948. Tenaris was organized on December 17, 2001.

In June 2006, the company acquired Maverick Tube for $3.185 billion.

In September 2006, it sold 75% of Dalmine, its Italian energy supply business, to E.ON for €39 million.

In 2007, the company acquired Hydril for $2.16 billion. The pressure control business was sold to GE Oil and Gas in April 2008.

In January 2020, the company acquired IPSCO Tubulars from OAO TMK for $1.2 billion.

== Controversies ==
=== Bribery settlement ===
In May 2011, Tenaris agreed to pay the United States Department of Justice US$8.9 million in the first ever deferred prosecution agreement with the U.S. Securities and Exchange Commission, after Tenaris voluntarily disclosed details of bribes made to officials of an Uzbek state-controlled oil firm to obtain competitor's bid information, which it used to submit revised bids in order to secure tenders.

=== Violence at TenarisTamsa facility ===
On several occasions, melees broke out at the TenarisTamsa facility in Veracruz, Mexico, over a dispute for union leadership between Pascual Lagunes Ochoa and José Carlos Guevara Malpica ("El Profe"), a convicted felon. These melees have resulted in injuries and deaths.

== See also ==
- List of steel producers
