= COVID-19 pandemic in Amazonas (Brazilian state) =

COVID-19 viral pandemic in Brazil

- Municipalities in the state of Amazonas with case numbers per 100,000 inhabitants

- Municipalities in the state of Amazonas per notification
- Disease: COVID-19
- Pathogen: SARS-CoV-2
- Location: Amazonas, Brazil
- First outbreak: Wuhan, Hubei, China
- Index case: Manaus
- Arrival date: 13 March 2020 (6 years, 2 months and 4 days)
- Confirmed cases: 232,434
- Deaths: 6,308

The COVID-19 pandemic in Brazil affected the state of Amazonas. The first case was from a 39-year-old woman who had returned from England.

== 2020 ==
On March 13, 2020, the first exact case confirmed in the state, in the capital Manaus. This was a 39-year-old woman who had returned from London, England. On March 24, the first death caused by the new coronavirus confirmed in Parintins. It was a 49-year-old man with systemic arterial hypertension. On March 30, the second death confirmed in the state, the first in the capital, Manaus. It was the musician Robson de Souza Lopes, the "Binho". He was 43 years old and had been hospitalized since March 20. He was an asthma carrier. On March 21, the governor of Amazonas, Wilson Lima, ordered the closure of bars and restaurants throughout the state to contain the spread of the new coronavirus. On March 24, Governor Wilson Lima authorized research into the use of chloroquine to fight the new coronavirus in patients in the state.

=== Collapse in Manaus ===
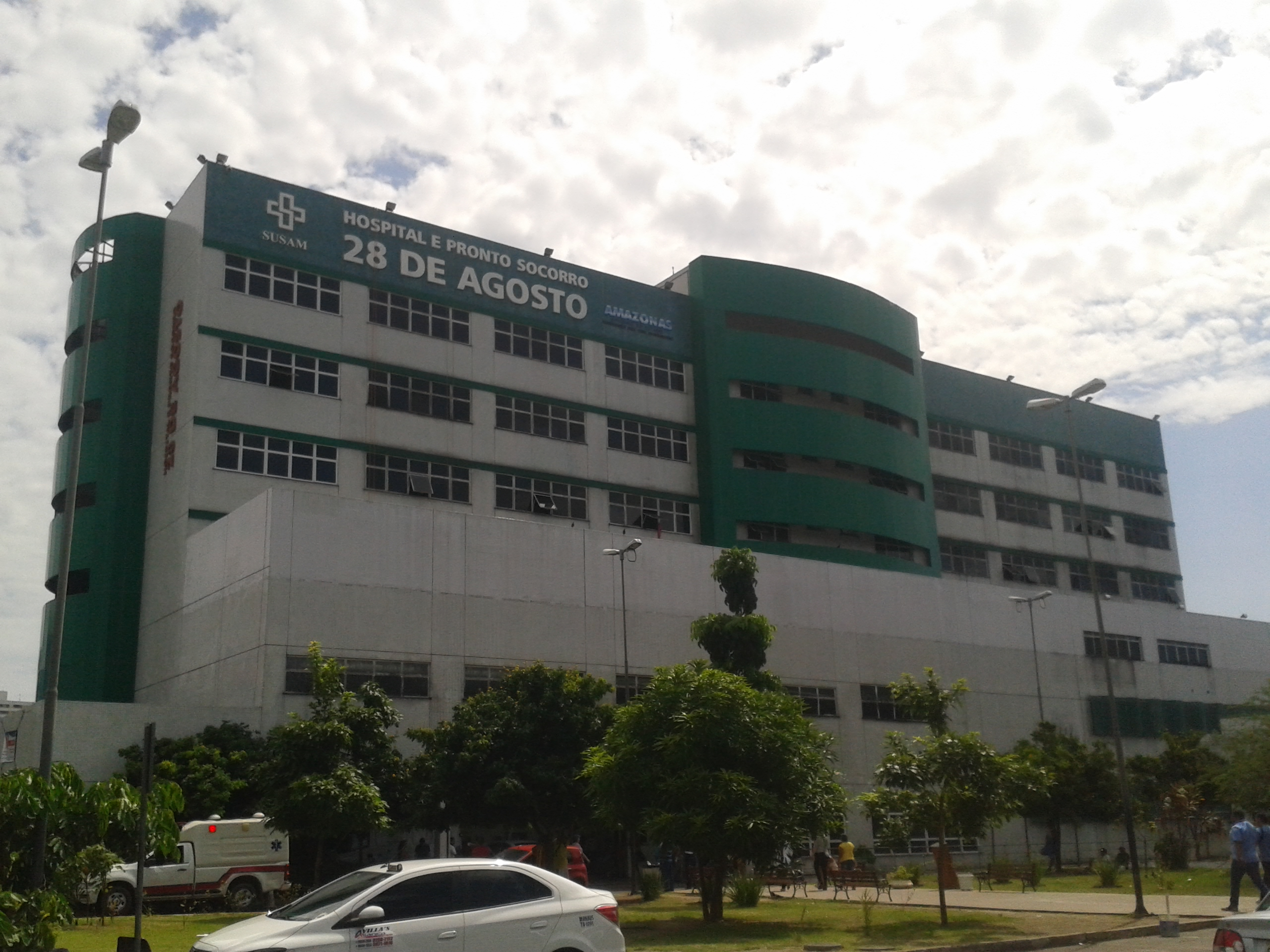
Hospital 28 de Agosto, in Manaus, the largest emergency hospital complex in the North region.

On April 20, Manaus began to open mass graves in the city's largest cemetery and the images began to resonate throughout Brazil.

On April 24, 2020, Manaus began to record hospital and funeral collapse. In the capital of Amazonas, the intensive care unit (ICU) beds were at maximum capacity, as in Hospital 28 de Agosto, which also had to pile up the corpses. The necroteries of Manaus no longer supported the increased demand and cooling containers were installed outside the hospitals.

== 2021 ==
=== Second wave of COVID-19 and new collapse ===
On January 12, 2021, Amazonas began to experience an apex in the demand for oxygen that it was unable to supply, and a curfew was decreed. Jorge Arreaza, Venezuela's Foreign Minister, following instructions from Nicolás Maduro, offered his country's stock to the government of Amazonas. State Governor Wilson Lima thanked the president of Venezuela on a social network. The first measure of reinforcement with federal participation was the sending of 350 cylinders of oxygen in airplanes of the Brazilian Air Force (FAB), between January 8 and 10.

The Secretary of Health of the State of Amazonas made the request to the Federal Government for new oxygen cylinders and towels on January 7, 2021, but almost nothing was done until the lack of the material, making on January 16 the lack of 4,650 cylinders of oxygen and according to the Ministry of Health, 5,000 cubic meters were sent to the region. The Ministry of Health was aware of the possibility of collapse since January 4, 2021.

In a speech in the region on January 11, Eduardo Pazuello said: "It is important that no one has doubts about what the planning is like and what alternatives we have. Yes, the ministry has and will have capacity to meet any demand that fails at a lower level, municipality or state, ministry is prepared for that". But it was about buying syringes, not some plan to deal with the lack of oxygen in the state. The minister even put pressure on the "early treatment" and in a conversation with supporters on January 15, President Jair Bolsonaro tried to take the weight off the Federal Government: "We are always doing what we have to do, right? Problem in Manaus: terrible problem there, now we did our part, with resources, means".

On January 14, 2021, the state decided to transfer a total of 235 patients to other states. They are being transported by FAB planes. According to the Ministry of Health, 149 beds in other cities were prepared and guaranteed immediately: 40 in São Luís (MA), 30 in Teresina (PI), 15 in João Pessoa (PB), 10 in Natal (RN), 20 in Goiânia (GO), 4 in Fortaleza (CE), 10 in Recife (PE) and 20 in the Federal District. The government of Pará informed the availability of 30 beds. The transfer of 61 newborns, babies and pregnant women in the ICU was suspended.

On January 15, 2021, the Workers' Party (PT) and the Communist Party of Brazil (PC do B) went to the Supreme Court and asked Minister Ricardo Lewandowski (reporter of court actions regarding the COVID-19 pandemic in Brazil) to carry out the lockdown, in addition to other stricter measures to contain the health crisis in the state. According to G1, "The parties reported to the minister that the situation in Amazonas represents an "unconstitutional state of affairs," characterized by "systematic violation of fundamental rights". "The picture presented, therefore, represents a true unconstitutional state of affairs, where the public authorities, especially the federal government, does not fulfill its duty to make effective the fundamental rights and guarantees of the citizens of Amazonia and Manawara, failing to guarantee the basic right to life, as well as health and, ultimately, the very dignity of the human person," the parties affirm in a joint note.

Some people stayed out in the open to try to buy oxygen from a distributor. Senator Eduardo Braga (MDB-AM) filed an emergency request for federal intervention in the Amazon in the area of health.

== Statistics ==
This is the list of municipalities with more confirmed cases:

Position	Municipality	N.° cases	N.° deaths
1	Manaus	9.713	888
2	Manacapuru	1.357	60
3	Tefé	663	32
4	Parintins	580	40
5	Coari	502	35
6	Tabatinga	472	45
7	Santo Antônio do Içá	365	8
8	Itacoatiara	337	33
9	Careiro	309	6
10	Iranduba	302	23
11	Rio Preto da Eva	299	7
12	São Gabriel da Cachoeira	265	12
13	São Paulo de Olivença	243	3
14	Maués	234	20
15	Autazes	232	21
16	Presidente Figueiredo	211	10
17	Boca do Acre	188	1

15 May 2020.
