= SIDOR =

Venezuelan steel corporation

Siderúrgica de Orinoco "Alfredo Maneiro" SIDOR C.A.
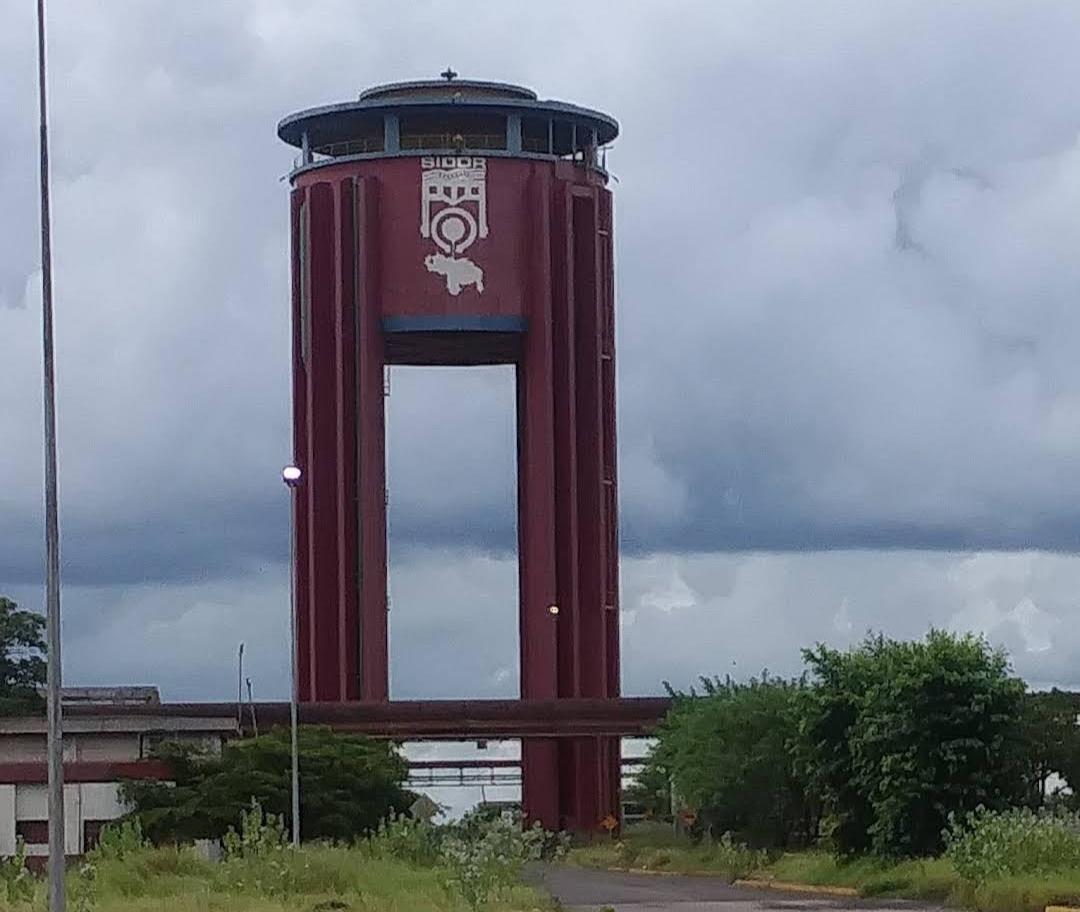
- Headquarters in Ciudad Guyana, Bolívar
- Trade name: SIDOR
- Formerly: Siderúrgica de Orinoco SIDOR C.A. (1953–2008)
- Type: State-owned company
- Founded: 1953; 73 years ago
- Headquarters: Ciudad Guayana, Bolívar, Venezuela
- Products: Steel
- Owner: Corporación Venezolana de Guayana
- Number of employees: 13,000
- Website: https://www.sidor.com

Siderúrgica de Orinoco "Alfredo Maneiro" SIDOR C.A. is the largest Venezuelan steel corporation. The company is situated in an industrial zone in Ciudad Guayana, Bolívar State, near the Orinoco River.

Major iron deposits were found in Bolívar State in 1926 and 1947. Mining companies constructed rail infrastructure to take iron ore to ports on the Orinoco River. The potential to process iron ore in Venezuela became more apparent with the construction of the Guri Dam (one of a series on the Caroní River) in the 1960s. The Sidor plant was designed to make use of hydro-electricity to process iron ore which had been hitherto exported. Funds for its construction were obtained from Venezuela's oil revenues.

SIDOR ceased operating permanently after the first 2019 Venezuelan blackout. Its production had been gradually decreasing since the company was nationalized in 2008 by Hugo Chávez. A former director said that Chávez had "received it as a productive and solvent company; but management coming from the military world, unaware of 'steel manufacturing' activity, together with the 'absence of strategic planning and investments, led to a sustained fall in production'."

== History ==
The production of steel by Sidor from 2007 to 2016. Data are from the Memoria 2011 and 2015 of the Ministerio del Poder Popular para Industrias of Venezuela. Data for 2016 is from Correo del Caroní (22. Jan. 2017).

Founded in 1953 as a public company, it was privatised in 1997 under President Rafael Caldera, with a 60% stake going to Argentina's Ternium. A famous Italian company, Innocenti, was the leading company driving all the start up of the project.

It was renationalised in mid-2008 under Hugo Chávez following a series of industrial disputes over pay which had paralysed the company for over a year. In early 2009 compensation of around $1.65bn was nearly agreed for the nationalisation of Ternium's 59.7% stake, with Ternium also keeping a 10% stake in the company.

Production went down from 4.3 million tons in 2007 to 307 thousand tons in 2016, production capacity being 4.6 million tons. Thousands of workers were said to be staring at the ceiling instead of working as of March 2019.

In March 2020, the factory was reactivated to help dealing with health emergency caused by COVID-19 pandemic. It now produces industrial gases such as oxygen, nitrogen and argon.

In January 2021, during the second wave of COVID-19 and collapse of Manaus' health system, in Brazil, Jorge Arreaza, Venezuela's Foreign Minister, following instructions from Nicolás Maduro, offered part of his country's stock of oxygen to the government of Amazonas. About 100,000 liters were loaded at Siderúrgica del Orinoco (SIDOR) to proceed to Brazil.

== See also ==
- Cerro Bolívar
