= Ternium =

Steel company founded in Luxembourg

Ternium S.A.
- Type: Public
- Traded as: BCBA: TXAR; NYSE: TX; MERVAL component
- Industry: Steel
- Founded: 2005; 21 years ago
- Headquarters: Luxembourg, Luxembourg
- Key people: Paolo Rocca, Chairman; Daniel Novegil, CEO
- Products: Steel; Cast iron Coke (fuel); Slag
- Production output: 9.764 million tons of steel and 3.310 million tons of iron ore
- Revenue: ▲US$17.610 billion (2023)
- Net income: ▼US$676 million (2023)
- Total assets: ▲US$24.179 billion (2023)
- Total equity: ▲US$12.419 billion (2023)
- Owner: Techint (62.02%); Tenaris (11.46%); Inverban Investments (3.01%), all of which are controlled by San Faustin S.A.
- Number of employees: 34,458, including 17,138 in Brazil and 10,103 in Mexico (2023)
- Website: www.ternium.com

Ternium S.A. is a manufacturer of flat and long steel products with production centers in Argentina, Brazil, Mexico, Guatemala, Colombia, and the United States. Ternium owns a 51.5% interest in Usiminas of Brazil. The company has an annual production capacity of 15.4 million tons. In 2023, 55% of its sales were from Mexico; 21% of sales were from Argentina; Bolivia, Chile, Paraguay and Uruguay; 13% of sales were from Brazil; and 11% of sales were from the United States, Colombia and Central America.

Approximately 21% of the company is publicly traded; the remainder is controlled by San Faustin S.A., which is in turn controlled by Rocca & Partners Stichting Administratiekantoor Aandelen San Faustin, a Stichting.

The company takes its name from the Latin words Ter (three) and Eternium (eternal) in reference to the integration of the three steel mills.

== History ==
Ternium was formed in 2005 by the consolidation of three companies: Siderar of Argentina, SIDOR of Venezuela and Hylsa (es) of Mexico.

In 2006, Ternium was listed on the New York Stock Exchange.

In 2007, Ternium acquired Grupo IMSA, expanding its operations into Guatemala and the United States.

In April 2008, after a series of worker disputes over pay which led to strike actions, SIDOR was nationalized by the government of Venezuela. In May 2009, compensation of US$1.65 billion was paid for Ternium's 59.7% stake in SIDOR.

In August 2010, Ternium acquired a 54% interest in Ferrasa, and in April 2015, Ternium acquired the remainder of the company, which was renamed Ternium Colombia.

In 2017, Ternium acquired CSA Siderúrgica do Atlântico for €1.4 billion and renamed it Ternium Brazil.

In July 2023, Ternium increased its ownership in Usiminas to 51.5%.
