= Usiminas =

Brazilian producers of steel

Usinas Siderurgicas de Minas Gerais S.A - Usiminas
- Type: Sociedade Anônima
- Traded as: B3: USIM3, USIM5, USIM6; BMAD: XUSIO; Ibovespa Component
- Industry: Mining & Siderurgy
- Founded: 1956
- Headquarters: Belo Horizonte, Brazil
- Key people: Marcelo Chara (CEO)
- Products: Steel
- Revenue: ▲US$ 3.5 billion (2018)
- Net income: ▲US$ 257.5 million (2018)
- Number of employees: 16,106
- Parent: Ternium Nippon Steel
- Website: usiminas.com/en/

Usiminas is one of the largest producers of steel in the Americas, with major steel mills in Brazil with a total capacity of 9.5 million metric tons of steel per year. The company accounts for 28% of total steel output in Brazil.

Usiminas has an installed capacity of producing 9.5 million tons of crude steel. The company also operates in the logistics sector through a stake in logistic company MRS Logística. The Usiminas industrial complex is the largest plain steel complex in Latin America and one of the top 20 in the whole world. The company was one of the largest shareholders in the Argentine company Ternium, accounting for 14.2% of total capital.

== See also ==
- Ipatinga massacre
