= Agostino Rocca =

Italian businessman

Agostino Rocca (1895–1978), founder of the Techint Group of Companies.

Agostino Rocca (1895 – 17 February 1978) was an Italo-Argentine businessman.

== Life and times ==
Agostino Rocca was born in 1895 in Milan. His family relocated to Rome early in his childhood, and he completed secondary school studies at the Collegio Militare di Roma. He enrolled at the Accademia Militare di Torino in 1913, but left to enrol in the Italian Army at the outset of World War I. During the war, he saw combat against Austro-Hungarian forces. Following the war, he enrolled in the Politecnico di Milano in 1921 to study engineering and married Maria Queirazza.

Rocca began as an engineering apprentice at Dalmine, a steelmaker, in 1923. He later became a financial advisor and worked for a number of prominent Italian firms, mainly in the manufacturing sector. He was made part of the Istituto per la Ricostruzione Industriale (IRI), the centrepiece of the Mussolini regime's corporate state, in 1933, and joined the body's military industries committee, becoming a member of the board of directors of a number of venerable names in Italian industry and engineering, notably Dalmine and Ansaldo, and overseeing their conversion into defence contractors ahead of hostilities leading to World War II.

He was appointed to the powerful post of director of Finsider, the IRI's financial arm, in 1938, but began distancing himself from Mussolini in 1941 and was dismissed. The transfer of the retreating Mussolini regime into northern Italy, and the declaration of the Italian Social Republic over the area in 1943, led Rocca to break with the regime, joining the British-sponsored opposition group Otto, and suffering arrest in Asti and Milan. Following the fall of the regime, he was arrested in Milan in April 1945 on the charge of collaborationism, but no longer an executive or administrator and a belated opponent of the deposed fascist state, Rocca was released without charges. He founded the Compagnia Tecnica Internazionale (Italian, Technical International Company) in September 1945.

Founded in Milan, Rocca's fledgling company was renamed Techint, its abbreviated telex code.

Awarded a contract to build a 1,600 km (1,000 mi) gas pipeline from Comodoro Rivadavia to Buenos Aires in 1949 by President Juan Perón, Techint became a leading government contractor during Perón's ambitious infrastructure program. Establishing subsidiaries in Brazil (1947), Chile (1951), and Mexico (1954), the company purchased a majority stake in Dalmine (Rocca's erstwhile employer) in 1954 and opened its first seamless steel tube plant in Campana the same year. Techint's Ensenada plant, in 1969, became the only Argentine manufacturer of cold rolled steel.

These developments prompted the Argentine government to enter into a tentative partnership with Techint through its state steel concern, Somisa. The joint venture with Techint's Propulsora Siderurgica was first announced in 1967, though, ultimately, a similar arrangement was concluded instead with a leading competitor, Acindar.

The ageing industrialist transferred management of the company to his elder son, Roberto Rocca, in 1975, and died in Buenos Aires on 17 February 1978, at age 83. Techint was, by then, a conglomerate with 15,000 employees, two steel manufacturing facilities in Argentina and international engineering and construction interests.
