= Techint =

Italian-Argentine manufacturing conglomerate

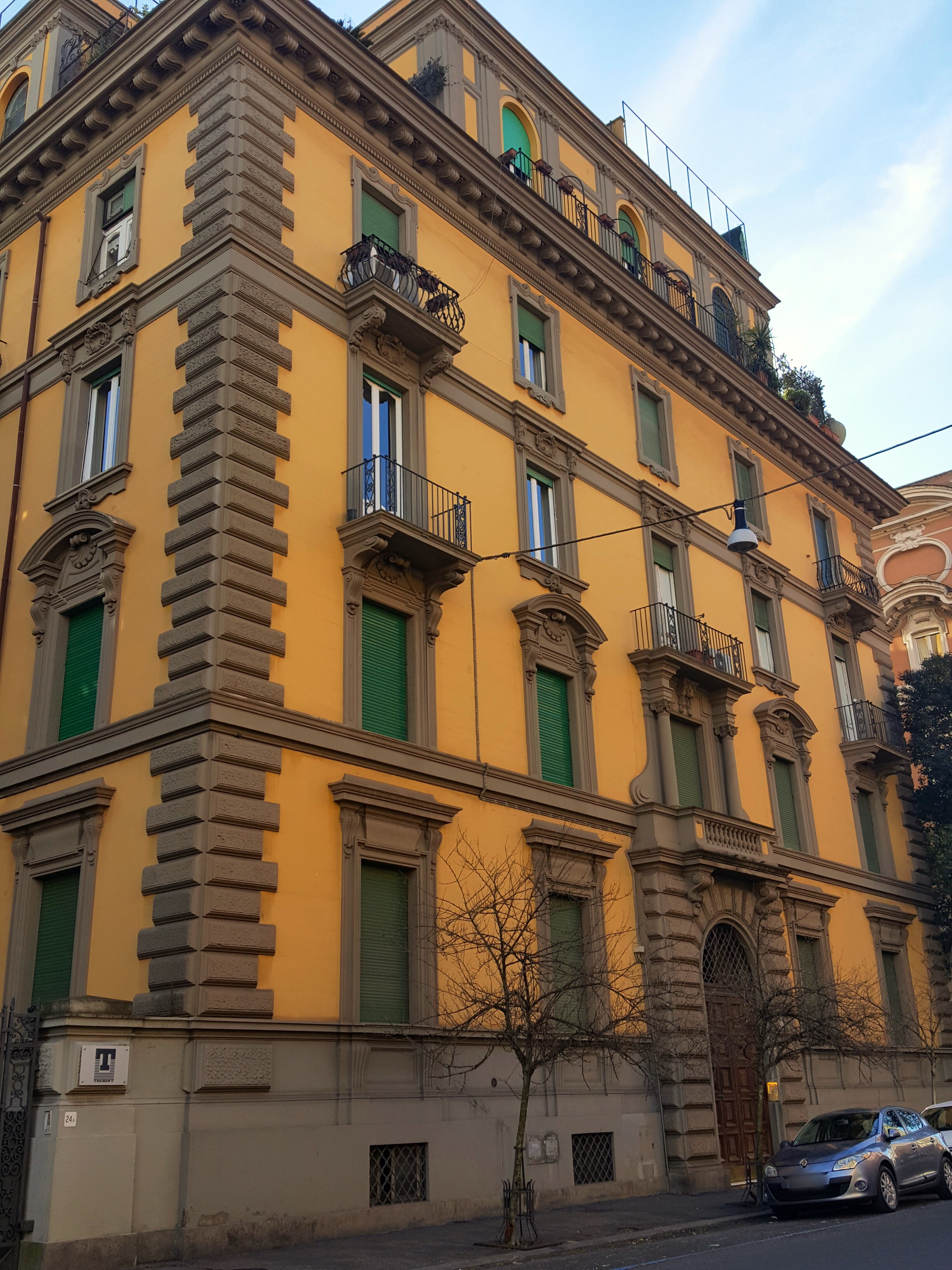
- Techint's Rome headquarters
- Type: Private
- Industry: Steel, Mining, Constructions, Engineering, Healthcare
- Founded: 1945; 81 years ago
- Founder: Agostino Rocca
- Headquarters: Buenos Aires; Milan
- Key people: Gianfelice Rocca (Chairman); Paolo Rocca (CEO)
- Products: Flat-rolled steel, tubular steel, industrial machinery, public infrastructure, oil & gas, mining, energy, health services
- Revenue: ▲US$38.4 billion (2023)
- Owner: San Faustin S.A., which is in turn controlled by Rocca & Partners Stichting Administratiekantoor Aandelen San Faustin, a Stichting
- Number of employees: 78,497 (2023)
- Divisions: Tenaris; Ternium; Techint E&C; Tenova Takraf; Tecpetrol; Humanitas
- Subsidiaries: Ferroexpreso Pampeano (62%)
- Website: www.techint.com

Techint is an Italian-Argentine conglomerate founded in Milan in 1945 by Italian industrialist Agostino Rocca and headquartered in Buenos Aires (Argentina) and Milan (Italy).

Techint operates with two main entities: Techint S.A., based in Buenos Aires, and Techint - Compagnia Tecnica Internazionale S.p.A., based in Milan.

Techint owns controlling interests in 6 major companies. Techint owns 62.02% of Ternium, a producer of steel for construction, and 60.45% of Tenaris, the largest producer of steel pipe for the petroleum industry. It also owns Techint Engineering & Construction, which provides operation and management services for complex and large-scale projects; Tenova, which designs technologies and develops services that help metals and mining companies limit environmental impact; Tecpetrol, an energy exploration and production company in Latin America; and Humanitas, which owns health care institutions.

The company is controlled by San Faustin S.A., which is in turn controlled by Rocca & Partners Stichting Administratiekantoor Aandelen San Faustin, a Stichting.

== History ==
The company was formed in September 1945 by as Compagnia Tecnica Internazionale (Italian for "Technical International Company") by Agostino Rocca, an executive at Ansaldo and later at Dalmine and Società Italiana Acciaierie Cornigliano (SIAC) and a major developer of the Italian steel industry in the 1930s. After World War II, Rocca, who opposed the fascist regime in Italy, traveled to Latin America, where he provided engineering and construction services. The company's first large project was building a network of large diameter pipelines in Argentina and Brazil.

In 1949, the company was awarded a contract to build a 1,600 km (1,000 mi) gas pipeline from Comodoro Rivadavia to Buenos Aires by President Juan Perón. Techint became a major government contractor during Perón's ambitious infrastructure program in Argentina. Creating subsidiaries in Brazil (1947), Chile (1951), and Mexico (1954), the company opened its first seamless steel tube plant in Campana, in 1954; in 1969, Techint's Ensenada plant became the only Argentine manufacturer of cold rolled steel.

The name of the company was changed to Techint, its abbreviated telex code.

In the 1980s, projects were undertaken in Argentina, Brazil, Ecuador and Mexico, and the company diversified, building the first nuclear facilities and offshore platforms.

In the early 1990s, Techint purchased a stake in state-owned SOMISA in Argentina. A significant part of Techint's core manufacturing strength has since been concentrated in the San Nicolás de los Arroyos-Villa Constitución oil-and-steel corridor, where the company is involved in the production of cold rolled steel. In those years, Techint invested in oil and gas blocks in Argentina through exploration and production company Tecpetrol.

In the mid 1990s, in Italy, the Techint Group entered the health services sector by building and managing Istituto Clinico Humanitas (ICH), a hospital and medical research institute near Milan.

In December 2001, Techint formed Tenaris to own steel pipe production assets from Siderca.

In August 2005, Techint bought 99.3% of Mexican Hylsamex for US$2.2 billion. It then merged it with Siderar, based in Argentina, and Sidor, based in Venezuela, to form Ternium, headquartered in Luxembourg.

In 2016, Techint entered the mining industry through Tenova's acquisition of several mining companies.
