= List of political families in Brazil =

This is an incomplete list of Brazilian political families, also known as “oligarchies” (oligarquias).

== A ==
The Alckmin family

- José Maria Alkmin (Vice President of Brazil, 1964-67)
- José Geraldo Rodrigues de Alckmin (Supreme Court Justice)
  - Geraldo Alckmin (Mayor of Pindamonhangaba, Presidential candidate, Vice Governor and four-term Governor of São Paulo state and Vice President of Brazil since 2023; nephew of José Geraldo, great-nephew of José Maria)
  - Maria Lúcia Ribeiro Alckmin (First Lady of Pindamonhangaba and of São Paulo state, Second Lady of São Paulo state and of Brazil; wife of Geraldo)

The Arraes-Campos family

- Miguel Arraes (Governor of Pernambuco, 1963–64, 1987–90, 1995–99)
  - Ana Arraes (Federal Deputy for Pernambuco, 2007–11; daughter of Miguel Arraes)
    - Marília Arraes (Federal Deputy for Pernambuco, 2019–23; paternal granddaughter of Miguel)
    - Eduardo Campos (Governor of Pernambuco, 2007–14; maternal grandson of Miguel)
      - João Henrique Campos (Mayor of Recife, 2021–present; great-grandson of Miguel)
      - Tabata Amaral (Federal Deputy; wife of João Campos)
      - Pedro Campos (Federal Deputy for Pernambuco, 2023–present; great-grandson of Miguel)

The Assed-Matheus (also known as Garotinho) family (spouses and children)

- Anthony Garotinho (Mayor of Campos dos Goytacazes, Governor of Rio de Janeiro State, presidential candidate)
- Rosinha Garotinho (Mayor of Campos dos Goytacazes, former Governor of Rio de Janeiro State)
  - Clarissa Garotinho (Deputy for Rio de Janeiro State)
  - Wladimir Garotinho (mayor of Campos dos Goytacazes)

The Azevedo family (brothers)

- Cleitinho Azevedo (Senator and governor of Minas Gerais)
- Gleidson Azevedo (Mayor of Divinópolis and Federal Deputy)

== B ==
The Barbalho family

- Laércio Barbalho (Pará State Deputy)
  - Jader Barbalho (Federal Deputy, Senator and Governor of Pará, President of the Senate; son of Laércio)
  - Elcione Barbalho (Federal Deputy; first ex-wife of Jader)
    - Jader Filho (Federal Deputy and Minister of Cities; son of Jader and Elcione)
    - Helder Barbalho (Mayor of Ananindeua, Senator and Governor of Pará; son of Jader and Elcione)
    - Daniela Barbalho (President of the Court of Auditors of Pará; wife of Helder)
    - Igor Normando (Mayor and councilman of Belém, State Deputy; nephew of Elcione)
    - Fabíola Cabral (Pernambuco State Deputy; wife of Igor)
  - Simone Morgado (State and Federal Deputy, Bragança councilman; second ex-wife of Jader)
  - José Priante (Pará State and Federal Deputy, Belém councilman; cousin of Jader)

The Barros-Borghetti family (spouses and daughter)

- Ricardo Barros (Federal Deputy and Health Minister)
- Cida Borghetti (Federal Deputy and Governor of Paraná state)
  - Maria Victoria Barros (Paraná State Deputy)

The Bolsonaro family

- Jair Bolsonaro (President of Brazil, 2019–23)
- Rogéria Bolsonaro (Rio de Janeiro city councillor, first wife of Jair)
  - Flávio Bolsonaro (Senator for Rio de Janeiro, son of Jair and Rogéria)
  - Eduardo Bolsonaro (Federal Deputy of São Paulo, son of Jair and Rogéria)
  - Carlos Bolsonaro (Senator for Santa Catarina, Rio de Janeiro city councillor, son of Jair and Rogéria)
- Ana Cristina Siqueira Valle (twice candidate for the Chamber of Deputies, second wife of Jair)
  - Renan Bolsonaro (Federal Deputy for Santa Catarina, Councillor of Balneário Camboriú, son of Jair and Ana Cristina)
- Michelle Bolsonaro (Senator for the Federal District and former First Lady of Brazil, third wife of Jair)
- Renato Bolsonaro (Federal Deputy for São Paulo, brother of Jair)

The Brás-Moreira family (cousins)

- Venceslau Brás (President of Brazil, 1914–18)
- Delfim Moreira (President of Brazil, 1918–19)

The Brizola family: Check under the “G” category

== C ==
The Cabral family

- Sérgio Cabral (writer and Rio de Janeiro councilman)
  - Sérgio Cabral Filho (Senator and Governor of Rio de Janeiro state; son of Sérgio)
    - Marco Antônio Cabral (Federal Deputy; son of Sérgio Filho and also related to the Neves-Cunha family)

The Caldas family

- João Caldas (councilman and mayor of Ibateguara, Alagoas state deputy)
- Eudócia Caldas (Senator for Alagoas)
  - João Henrique Caldas (Mayor of Maceió and Governor of Alagoas, son of the above)
  - Marina JHC (Senator for Alagoas, wife of João Henrique)

The Calheiros family

- Renan Calheiros (Senator for Alagoas, President of the Senate, Minister of Justice)
  - Renan Filho (Senator, Governor of Alagoas, Minister of Transport, son of Renan)
- Olavo Calheiros (State and Federal Deputy, brother of Renan)
- Renildo Calheiros (Mayor of Olinda, Federal Deputy for Pernambuco, brother of Renan and Olavo)

The Campos family

- Look under section A (Arraes-Campos family)

The Cardoso family of Minas Gerais

- Newton Cardoso (former governor of Minas Gerais; 1987-91, mayor of Contagem and Federal Deputy)
  - Newton Cardoso Júnior (Federal Deputy since 2015, son of Newton)

The Cardoso family of São Paulo

- Leônidas Cardoso (Federal Deputy for São Paulo 1955–1959)
  - Fernando Henrique Cardoso (President of Brazil, 1995–2003; son of Leônidas Cardoso)
  - Ruth Cardoso (First Lady of Brazil, 1995-2003; wife of Fernando Henrique)

The Cartaxo family (twin brothers)

- Luciano Cartaxo (Mayor and councilman of João Pessoa, State Deputy, Vice-governor of Paraíba
- Lucélio Cartaxo (Paraíba Gubernatorial candidate in 2018)

The Coimbra-Luz family

- Cesário Cecílio de Assis Coimbra (mayor of Cabo Verde, Minas Gerais)
  - Carlos Luz (President of Brazil in 1955; grandson of Cesário Cecílio)
    - Joaquim Delfino Ribeiro da Luz (Minister; paternal uncle of Carlos)
    - Américo Gomes Ribeiro da Luz (Federal Deputy; paternal uncle of Carlos)
      - Leovigildo Leal da Paixão (Minas Gerais Regional Electoral Justice; son-in-law of Américo)
    - Alberto Gomes Ribeiro da Luz (Minas Gerais Court Justice: father of Carlos)

The Collor-Mello family

- Lindolfo Collor (Minister of Labor)
  - Arnon Farias de Mello (Governor of Alagoas; son-in-law of Lindolfo Collor)
    - Fernando Collor de Mello (President of Brazil, 1990–92; son of Arnon Farias de Mello)
    - Pedro Collor de Mello (businessman and politician; son of Arnon Farias de Mello)
- Euclides Vieira Malta (Governor of Alagoas; uncle-in-law of Fernando; see The Malta-Ribeiro family for details)

The Costa family

- João José Teodoro da Costa (State Deputy in Santa Catarina)
  - Otacílio Vieira da Costa (State Deputy in Santa Catarina; son of João José)
    - Belisário Ramos da Costa (Judge in Santa Catarina; son of Otacílio)

The Covas family

- Mário Covas Júnior (Senator, mayor of São Paulo, Presidential candidate and two-term Governor of São Paulo state)
- Lila Covas (President of the São Paulo Social Fund; wife of Mário)
  - Mário Covas Neto (2018 Senatorial candidate; son of Mário and Lila)
    - Bruno Covas (State and Federal Deputy, mayor of São Paulo, 2018-21; grandson of Mário and Lila and nephew of Mário Covas Neto)

The Cunha Lima family

- Ronaldo Cunha Lima (Governor, Federal Deputy and Senator for Paraíba).
  - Cássio Cunha Lima (Governor of Paraíba, Senator and Vice-President of the Senate; son of Ronaldo)
    - Pedro Cunha Lima (Federal Deputy for Paraíba; son of Cássio)
- Ivandro Cunha Lima (Senator and Federal Deputy; brother of Ronaldo)
    - Bruno Cunha Lima (State Deputy and mayor of Campina Grande; grandson of Ivandro)
- Arthur Cunha Lima (former Paraíba State Deputy; cousin of Ronaldo and Ivandro)

== D ==
The de Barros family

- Ademar de Barros (Mayor of São Paulo and Governor of São Paulo state)
- Leonor Mendes de Barros (São Paulo First Lady and conservative activist; wife of Ademar)
  - Ademar de Barros Filho (Federal Deputy; son of Ademar and Leonor)
- Antônio Barros Filho (Senator; brother of Ademar)
  - Reinaldo de Barros (mayor of São Paulo; son of Antônio)
- Geraldo Pereira de Barros (State and Federal Deputy, Mayor of Lençóis Paulista and of São Manuel; brother of Ademar and Antônio)

The Dias family (brothers)

- Alvaro Dias (State and Federal Deputy, Senator and Governor of Paraná state)
- Osmar Dias (Senator and gubernatorial candidate)

== F ==
The Figueiredo family

- Euclides Figueiredo (Federal Deputy for Rio de Janeiro)
  - João Figueiredo (President of Brazil, 1979–85; son of Euclides)

The Fonseca family

- Deodoro da Fonseca (President of Brazil, 1889–91)
  - Hermes da Fonseca (President of Brazil, 1910–14; nephew of Deodoro da Fonseca)
  - Nair de Tefé (influential First Lady and political cartoonist; wife of Hermes da Fonseca)

The Franco family

- Marielle Franco (Councillor of Rio de Janeiro, 2017–18)
- Mônica Benício (Councillor of Rio de Janeiro, since 2021; widow of Marielle)
- Anielle Franco (Minister of Racial Equality, 2023–present; sister of Marielle)

The Fruet family (father and son)

- Maurício Fruet (mayor of Curitiba, 1983-86)
- Gustavo Fruet (mayor of Curitiba, 2013-16)

The Furlan family (spouses)

- Antônio Furlan (Mayor of Macapá and Governor of Amapá)
- Rayssa Furlan (Senator for Amapá)

== G ==
The Garotinho family: Check under the “A” category

The Geisel-Markus family

- Augusto Frederico Markus (Mayor of Estrela, Rio Grande do Sul)
  - Ernesto Geisel (President of Brazil, 1974–79; son-in-law of Augusto)

The Genro family

- Adelmo Genro (Vice-Mayor of Santa Maria)
  - Adelmo Genro Filho (Santa Maria city councillor; son of Adelmo)
  - Tarso Genro (Governor of Rio Grande do Sul; son of Adelmo)
    - Luciana Genro (Presidential candidate and Deputy for Rio Grande do Sul; daughter of Tarso)
    - Roberto Robaína (Rio Grande do Sul gubernatorial candidate; husband of Luciana)
      - Fernando Genro (footballer and left-wing activist; son of Luciana and Roberto)

The Goulart-Brizola family (brothers-in-law)

- João Goulart (President of Brazil, 1961–64)
  - João Goulart Filho (State Deputy for Rio Grande do Sul and presidential candidate in 2018)
- Leonel Brizola (Governor of Rio Grande do Sul and Rio de Janeiro State; brother-in-law of João Goulart)
  - José Vicente Goulart Brizola (Deputy for Rio Grande do Sul; son of Leonel and Neusa Goulart)
    - Carlos Daudt Brizola (Minister of Labour and Deputy for Rio Grande do Sul; grandson of Leonel)
    - Juliana Brizola (Deputy for Rio Grande do Sul; granddaughter of Leonel)
    - Brizola Neto (Deputy for Rio de Janeiro; grandson of Leonel and twin brother of Juliana)
  - Neusinha Brizola (singer and songwriter; daughter of Leonel Brizola and Neusa Goulart)

== J ==
The Jobim family

- Walter Só Jobim (Governor of Rio Grande do Sul, 1947-51)
  - Hélvio Jobim (State Deputy of Rio Grande do Sul; son of Walter)
    - Nelson Jobim (member and President of the Brazilian Supreme Court, Minister of Justice and Defense; son of Hélvio)

== K ==
The Kleinübing family

- Waldemar Kleinübing, mayor of Videira, Santa Catarina 1966–70.
  - Vilson Pedro Kleinübing, Federal Deputy 1983–87, Mayor of Blumenau 1989–90, Governor of Santa Catarina 1991–94, Federal Senator 1995–98. Son of Waldemar.
    - João Paulo Kleinübing, State Deputy for Santa Catarina 2003–04, Mayor of Blumenau 2005–13, Secretary of Health of Santa Catarina 2015–16, Federal Deputy for Santa Catarina 2015–19. Son of Vilson.

The Krause family

- Gustavo Krause (Federal Deputy, twice minister, Governor and Vice-governor of Pernambuco, mayor of Recife
  - Priscila Krause (Vice-governor of Pernambuco, daughter of Gustavo)

The Kubitschek family

- João Nepumuceno Kubitschek (Vice-governor of Minas Gerais)
- Juscelino Kubitschek de Oliveira (President of Brazil, 1956–61)
- Sarah Kubitschek (First Lady of Belo Horizonte, Minas Gerais and Brazil, wife of Juscelino)
  - Márcia Kubitschek (Lieutenant Governor of the Brazilian Federal District; daughter of Juscelino)
  - Maria Estela Kubitschek (candidate for Deputy Governor of Rio de Janeiro in 2006; daughter of Juscelino)
- Jaime Gomes de Sousa Lemos (Federal Deputy; father-in-law of Juscelino)
- Gabriel Passos (Federal Deputy; father-in-law of Juscelino)
  - Negrão de Lima (Governor of Guanabara; uncle of Juscelino's wife Sarah)
  - Octacílio Negrão de Lima (Cabinet member and Mayor of Belo Horizonte; uncle of Juscelino's wife Sarah)
  - João Antônio de Lemos (Deputy of the Empire; distant great-niece of Sarah)

== L ==
The Lira family

- Benedito de Lira (Senator for Alagoas)
  - Arthur Lira (Federal Deputy and President of the Chamber of Deputies, son of Benedito)
    - Alvinho Lira (Youngest ever member of the Chamber of Deputies, son of Arthur)

The Lobão family (spouses and son)

- Edison Lobão (former Governor and Senator for Maranhão)
- Nice Lobão (former Federal Deputy)
  - Lobão Filho (former Senator for Maranhão)

The Lucena family

- Humberto Lucena (Paraíba State and Federal Deputy, Senator and President of the Senate)
  - Cícero Lucena (Mayor of João Pessoa; nephew of Humberto)
    - Mersinho Lucena (Federal Deputy, son of Cícero)

The Lula da Silva family (spouses and sons)

- Luiz Inácio Lula da Silva (President of Brazil, 2003–10; 2023–present)
- Marisa Letícia Lula da Silva (First Lady of Brazil, 2003-10, second wife of Luiz Inácio)
  - Fabio Luís Lula da Silva (businessman and biologist)
  - Marcos Cláudio Lula da Silva (São Bernardo do Campo city councilor; step-son of Lula)
- Janja Lula da Silva (First Lady of Brazil, 2023-, third wife of Luiz Inácio)

The Lyra family

- João Soares Lyra Filho (Mayor of Caruaru, State and Federal deputy for Pernambuco
  - João Lyra Neto (Mayor of Caruaru, State Deputy for Pernambuco, Vice-governor and interim governor of Pernambuco, son of João Filho)
    - Raquel Lyra (Mayor of Caruaru and Governor of Pernambuco, daughter of João Neto)
  - Fernando Lyra (Minister of Justice and Federal Deputy for Pernambuco, son of João Filho)

== M ==
The Magalhães family

- Francisco Peixoto de Magalhães (Deputy for Bahia)
  - Ângelo Magalhães (Deputy for Bahia; son of Francisco)
    - Paulo Magalhães (Deputy for Bahia; son of Ângelo)
  - Antônio Carlos Magalhães (Governor of Bahia; son of Francisco)
    - Antônio Carlos Magalhães Júnior (Senator for Bahia)
      - Antônio Carlos Magalhães Neto (former mayor of Salvador)
  - (Deputy for Bahia; son of Antônio Carlos)

The Maia family

- Cesar Maia (former Federal Deputy and three-term mayor of Rio de Janeiro)
  - Rodrigo Maia (former Federal Deputy and President of the Chamber of Deputies, son of Cesar)
- José Agripino Maia (former Senator and Governor of Rio Grande do Norte, cousin of Cesar)

The Malta-Ribeiro family

- Manuel Gomes Ribeiro (Governor of Alagoas)
  - Euclides Vieira Malta (Governor of Alagoas; son-in-law of Manuel)

The Matarazzo-Suplicy family

- Francesco Matarazzo (Count)
  - Ciccillo Matarazzo (Mayor of Ubatuba; nephew of Francesco)
    - Andrea Matarazzo (Alderman for São Paulo; grandson of Ciccillo)
    - Eduardo Matarazzo Suplicy (Senator for São Paulo state; great-grandson of Francesco)
    - Marta Suplicy (Mayor of São Paulo and Senator for São Paulo state; former wife of Eduardo)
- Francisco Matarazzo (Deputy for São Paulo State)

The Mendonça-Vilaça family

- José Mendonça Bezerra (Federal and State Deputy for Pernambuco)
  - Mendonça Filho (Federal Deputy, minister and Governor of Pernambuco; son of José)
- Marcos Vilaça (member and President of the Tribunal de Contas da União; father-in-law of Mendonça Filho)

== N ==
The Neves-Cunha family

- Tancredo Neves (President-elect of Brazil)
  - Tristão Ferreira da Cunha (Congressional Deputy from Minas Gerais)
  - Aécio Cunha (Congressional Deputy from Minas Gerais)
    - Aécio Neves da Cunha (former governor of Minas Gerais and presidential candidate)

== Q ==
The Quadros family

- Jânio Quadros (President of Brazil in 1961)
  - Dirce Tutu Quadros (Federal Deputy for São Paulo; daughter of Jânio)

== R ==
The Ramos family

- Vidal José de Oliveira Ramos Júnior (Senator and Governor of Santa Catarina)
  - Nereu Ramos (President of Brazil; son of Vidal)
  - Hugo de Oliveira Ramos (State Deputy; son of Vidal)
  - Celso Ramos (Governor of Santa Catarina; son of Vidal)
  - Mauro de Oliveira Ramos (Mayor of Florianópolis; son of Vidal)
  - Vidal Ramos Junior (Mayor of Lages; son of Vidal)
- Belisário Ramos (Provincial Deputy; brother of Vidal)
  - Aristiliano Ramos (governor; Belisário's son)
  - Aristides Batista Ramos (Mayor of Florianópolis; Belisário's son)
  - Otacílio Vieira da Costa (State Deputy in Santa Catarina; Belisário's son-in-law; see the Costa family for details)
- Cândido Ramos (governor; Vidal's nephew)
- Saulo Ramos (senator; Vidal's nephew)

The Requião family

- Wallace Tadeu de Mello e Silva (interim mayor of Curitiba)
  - Maurício Requião (former Federal Deputy; son of Wallace)
  - Roberto Requião (Mayor of Curitiba, Senator and Governor of Paraná state; son of Wallace)
    - Requião Filho (Paraná State Deputy; son of Roberto)

The Rezende family (spouses)

- Iris Rezende (Senator, Minister of Justice and of Agriculture, four-term mayor of Goiânia and two-term Governor of Goiás)
- Iris de Araújo (Federal Deputy and television presenter)

The Rousseff-Araújo family (divorced spouses)

- Dilma Rousseff (President of Brazil, 2011-16)
- Carlos Araújo (Rio Grande do Sul State Deputy)

== S ==
The Sarney-Macieira family

- Sarney de Araújo Costa (justice of the Court of Justice of Maranhão)
  - José Sarney (President of Brazil, 1985–90; son of Sarney)
  - Marly Sarney (former First Lady of Brazil and of Maranhão; wife of José)
    - Fernando Sarney (member of the FIFA Council; son of José)
    - Roseana Sarney (former governor and Senator from Maranhão; daughter of José)
    - Sarney Filho (State and Federal Deputy from Maranhão; son of José)
      - Adriano Sarney (Maranhão State Deputy; son of Sarney Filho)
  - Roberto Macieira (Mayor of São Luís, Maranhão; brother of Marly)
  - Simone Macieira (São Luís city councillor; wife of Roberto)

== V ==
The Vargas-Dornelles-Peixoto family

- Manoel do Nascimento Vargas (mayor of São Borja)
  - Getúlio Dornelles Vargas (President of Brazil, 1930–45 and 1951–54; son of Manoel)
  - Darci Vargas (First Lady, wife of Getúlio)
    - Lutero Vargas (Congressional Deputy from Rio de Janeiro, son of Getúlio)
    - Maneco Vargas (mayor of Porto Alegre; son of Getúlio)
    - Alzira Vargas do Amaral Peixoto (lawyer, Presidential advisor and author; daughter of Getúlio)
    - Ernani do Amaral Peixoto (Governor of Rio de Janeiro State, husband of Alzira)
    - Ivete Vargas Tatsch (Congressional Deputy from São Paulo State; grandniece of Getúlio)
  - Ernesto Dorneles (Senator, Governor of Rio Grande do Sul and Minister of Agriculture; cousin of Getúlio)
    - Francisco Dornelles (Senator and interim Governor of Rio de Janeiro State; nephew of Ernesto and also related to the Neves-Cunha family)
