= Arraes =

Arraes is a surname. Notable people with the surname include:

- Ana Arraes (born 1947), Brazilian judge and politician
- Guel Arraes (born 1953), Brazilian filmmaker and TV director
- Jarid Arraes (born 1991), Brazilian poet and writer
- Luisa Arraes (born 1993), Brazilian actress
- Marília Arraes (born 1984), Brazilian politician
- Miguel Arraes (1916–2005), Brazilian lawyer and politician
