= Maximiano Campos =

Brazilian writer and journalist (1941–1998)

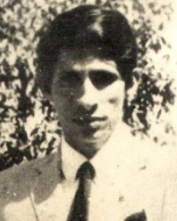

Secretary of Tourism, Culture, and Sports of Pernambuco
- In office January 1987 – December 1988

Personal details
- Born: Maximiano Accioly Campos; 19 November 1941 Recife, Pernambuco, Brazil
- Died: 7 August 1998 (aged 56) Recife, Pernambuco, Brazil
- Spouse: Ana Arraes
- Children: 2, including Eduardo
- Relatives: Guel Arraes (brother-in-law); João Henrique Campos (grandson); Pedro Campos (grandson); Marília Arraes (great-niece)
- Education: Catholic University of Pernambuco

Maximiano Accioly Campos (19 November 1941 – 7 August 1998) was a Brazilian poet, writer, and journalist who was a member of the Generation 65 Movement. He was the father of former governor of Pernambuco and government minister Eduardo Campos.

== Biography ==
Campos was born on 19 November 1941 in Recife. After he graduated with a law degree from the Catholic University of Pernambuco, he was a columnist with Diario de Pernambuco and was a superintendent at the Institute of Documentation at the Fundação Joaquim Nabuco. From January 1987 to December 1988, he was the State Secretary of Tourism, Culture, and Sports of Pernambuco during the governorship of his father-in-law Miguel Arraes.

He was married to Ana Arraes, with whom he had two sons: Eduardo Campos, and lawyer, writer, and member of the Academia Pernambucana de Letras, Antônio Campos.

Campos was the author of 17 books, some of which were released posthumously. His first work, the romance novel Sem Lei nem Rei, was also his most well known and tells the story of fights between colonels in the sertão and zona da mata of Pernambuco.

== Bibliography ==
- Sem Lei nem Rei, romance (1968),
- As Emboscadas da Sorte, stories (1971)
- As Sentenças do Tempo, stories (1973),
- A Loucura Imaginosa, novel (1973)
- O Major Façanha, novel (1975),
- A Memória Revoltada, novel (1982)
- As Feras Mortas, stories (1995)
- O Viajante e o Horizonte, stories (1997)
- O Lavrador do Tempo, poems (1998)
- Cartas aos Amigos, essays and letters (2001)
- Os Cassacos, novel (2003)
- Na estrada, stories (2004),
- Do Amor e Outras Loucuras, poems (2004),
- A multidão solitária (2006)

== Filmography ==
- Sem Lei Nem Rei - Maximiniano Campos, documentary (2007). Directed by Marcelo Peixoto.

== Awards and tributes ==
- A school in Jaboatão dos Guararapes was named in tribute to Campos.
