= Paulo Azi =

Brazilian politician

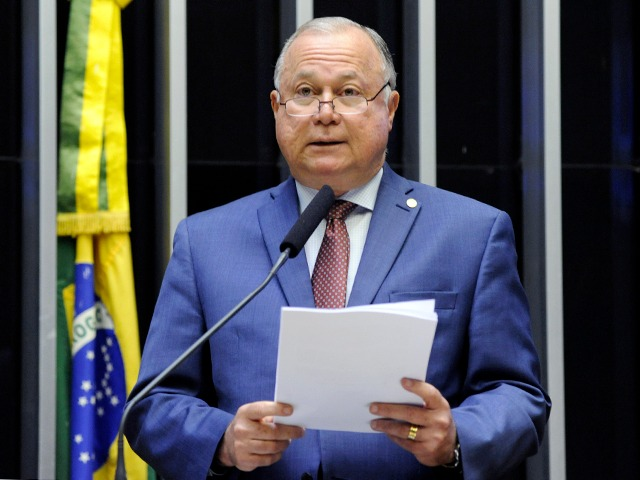
- Azi in 2019

Member of the Chamber of Deputies
- Incumbent
- Assumed office 1 February 2015
- Constituency: Bahia

Member of the Legislative Assembly of Bahia
- In office 1 February 2003 – 1 February 2015
- Constituency: At-large

Personal details
- Born: Paulo Velloso Dantas Azi; 14 January 1963 (age 63) Salvador, Bahia, Brazil
- Party: UNIÃO (2022–present)
- Other political affiliations: PFL (1994–2007); DEM (2007–2022)
- Profession: Civil engineer

Paulo Velloso Dantas Az (born 14 January 1963) more commonly known as Paulo Azi is a Brazilian politician as well as a civil engineer and businessman. He has spent his political career representing his home state of Bahia, having served as state representative since 2015.

== Personal life ==
He is the son of Jairo Azi and Julieta Velloso Dantas Azi. He holds a degree in civil engineering from the Federal University of Bahia, graduating in 1986. He earned his postgraduate degree in 1991 from the Catholic University of Salvador.

== Political career ==
Pereira voted in favor of the impeachment motion of then-president Dilma Rousseff. Pereira voted for the 2017 Brazilian labor reform, and would vote against the opening of a corruption investigation into Rousseff's successor Michel Temer.

As a member of the champer of deputies, Azi has campaigned to legalize gambling, arguing that it would help raise tax revenue. He is politically conservative and seen as an ally of Jair Bolsonaro.
