= Pedro Campos (disambiguation) =

Pedro Campos may refer to:

- Pedro Albizu Campos (1893–1965), Puerto Rican attorney, politician, and independence activist
- Pedro Campos (born 1995), Brazilian politician
- Pedro Campos (footballer, born 2000), Chilean footballer
