= Maria Arraes =

Brazilian politician (born 1994)

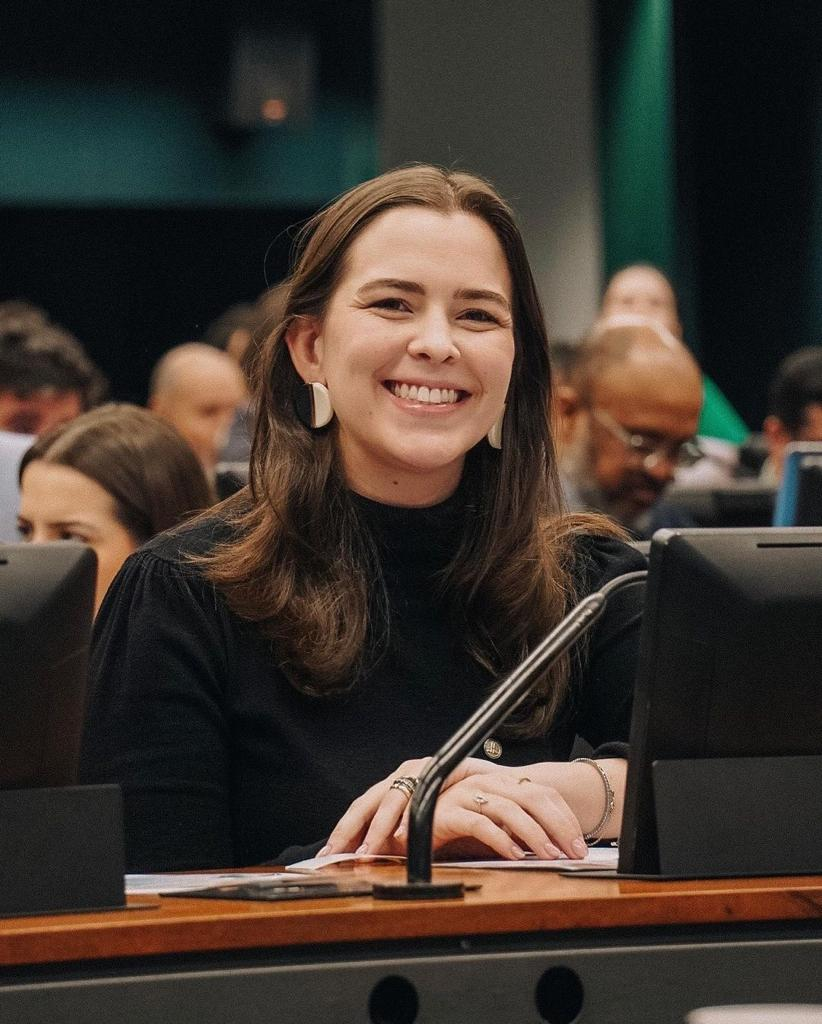
- Arraes in 2023

Member of the Chamber of Deputies
- Incumbent
- Assumed office 1 February 2023
- Constituency: Pernambuco

Personal details
- Born: 24 February 1994 (age 32)
- Party: PSB (since 2026)
- Relatives: Marília Arraes (sister); Miguel Arraes (grandfather)

Maria Leal Arraes de Alencar (born 24 February 1994) is a Brazilian politician serving as a member of the Chamber of Deputies since 2023. She is the sister of Marília Arraes and the granddaughter of Miguel Arraes.
