= Paula Oliveira case =

2009 Swiss stabbing accusation case

Paula Oliveira
- Born: Paula Oliveira Maciel Ventura; October 20, 1982 (age 43); Recife, Pernambuco
- Occupation: Lawyer
- Parent(s): Paulo Oliveira Maciel and Jeni Ventura

The Paula Oliveira case refers to the claim made by Paula Oliveira Ventura, a Brazilian citizen resident in Switzerland, that she was stabbed by neo-Nazi skinheads, and that she was pregnant and miscarried as a result of the attack. She claimed that it happened in Dübendorf in the night of February 9, 2009. The case generated national and international repercussions; the version first provided by Ventura suggested that it was an act of xenophobia.

Ventura was injured on February 9, 2009 near a train station, after being allegedly stabbed for about 100 times. She was helped by the police of Zurich. Ventura said she was pregnant with twins, and was immediately hospitalized by doctors at University Hospital Zurich. Among the numerous cuts on her body, the acronym "SVP" drew some attention, which stands for Schweizerische Volkspartei (Swiss People's Party), a far right Swiss political party that condemns the entry of foreigners in the country.

Days before the attack took place, Ventura sent an email to friends and colleagues with ultrasound images of a report on a pregnancy of twins. She sent a notice via email saying that she was pregnant. She enclosed a picture with the title "Twins 6 wks".

The Zurich prosecutor confirmed that she lied about the abuse suffered, and about being pregnant. According to police, Paula Oliveira would self-flagellate, and she may face three years in prison for trying to mislead the authorities. The governor of Pernambuco, Eduardo Campos, regretted what happened and met with family members to help in investigations.

Ventura is being monitored by doctors for psychological trauma, and has been in her residence in Dübendorf since February 17, 2009. According to her family, Ventura has Systemic lupus erythematosus, immune disorder that can cause psychiatric disorders. Ventura had a history of inventing things to draw attention to her.

On December 16, 2009, she was trialed and convicted to pay a 10,800 swiss franc fine and more 2,500 swiss francs as compensation for the judicial expenses. She was released to leave Switzerland but declared the intention to stay in the country. Nevertheless, her visa expired in March 2010 and she had to return to Brazil.

== Sources ==
- http://www.swissinfo.ch/por/capa.html?siteSect=109&ty=st&sid=10321019
- http://www.swissinfo.ch/spa/sociedad/Brasilena_embarazada_denuncia_ataque_racista_en_Zurich.html?siteSect=601&sid=10322936&cKey=1234516760000&ty=st
- http://www.ovimagazine.com/art/4072
- bbc.co.uk
