= 2024 Recife mayoral election =

← 2020	October 6, 2024	2028 →
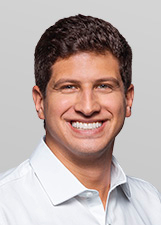

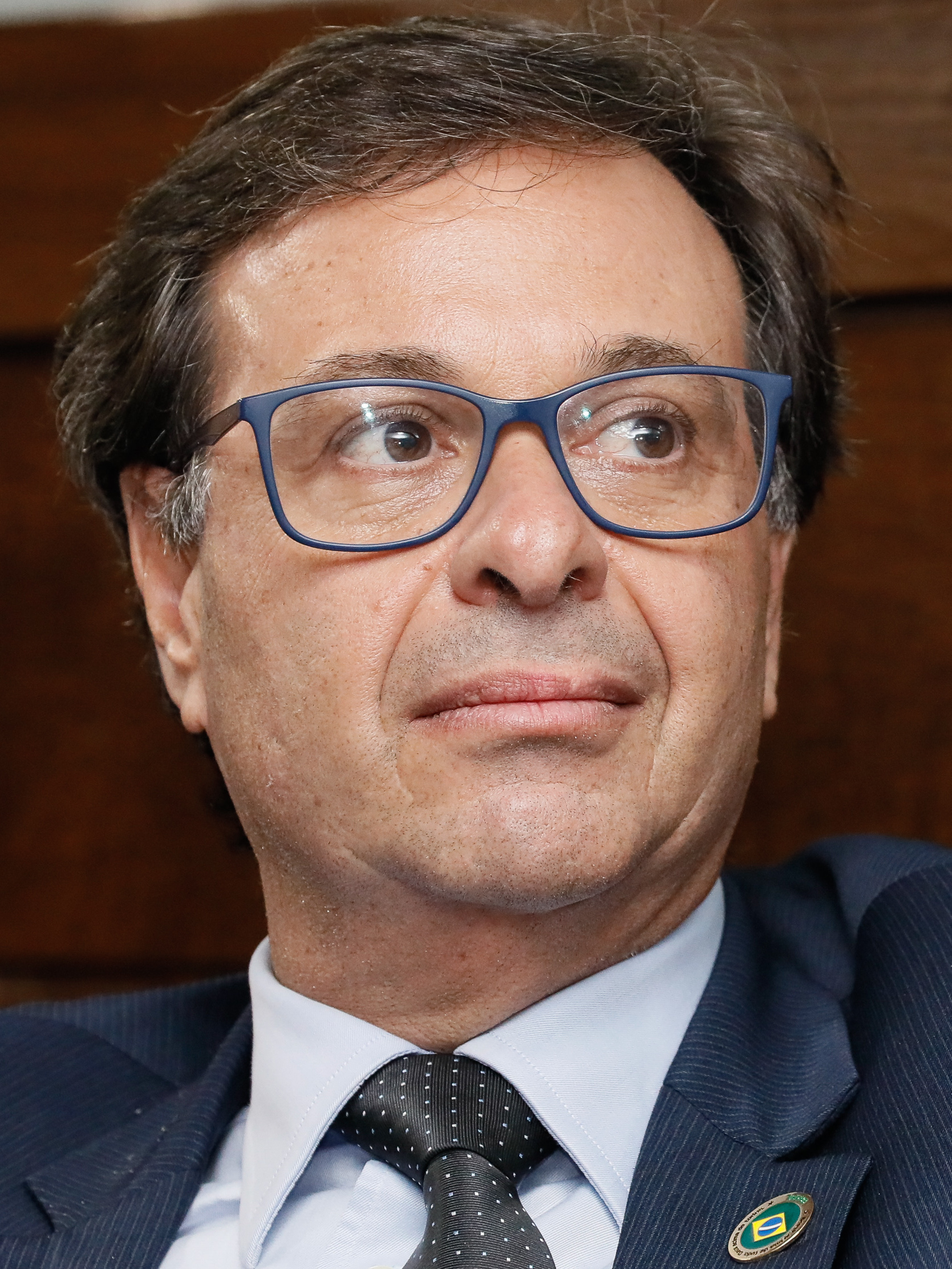
Nominee	João Campos	Gilson Machado Neto
Party	PSB	PL
Alliance	Popular Front of Recife	None
Running mate	Victor Marques	Cláudia Zininha
Popular vote	725,721	129,138
Percentage	78.11%	13.90%
- Winners by electoral zone Campos 70-79; Campos 80-89
Mayor before election
João Campos
PSB
Elected mayor
João Campos
PSB

The 2024 Recife municipal election took place in the city of Recife, Brazil on 6 October 2024. Voters elected a mayor, vice mayor, and 39 councillors.

The incumbent mayor is João Campos of the PSB. Campos is the son of the former governor of Pernambuco Eduardo Campos, who died in a plane crash while running in the 2014 presidential election. Campos was previously a Federal Deputy before being elected in the second round mayor of Recife in 2020.

Campos was elected in the first round, facing scattered opposition.

== Results ==
Popular vote (first round)
João Campos	78.11%
Machado Neto	13.91%
Dani Portela	3.78%
Daniel Coelho	3.21%
Others	0.99%
