= Marília Arraes =

Brazilian politician

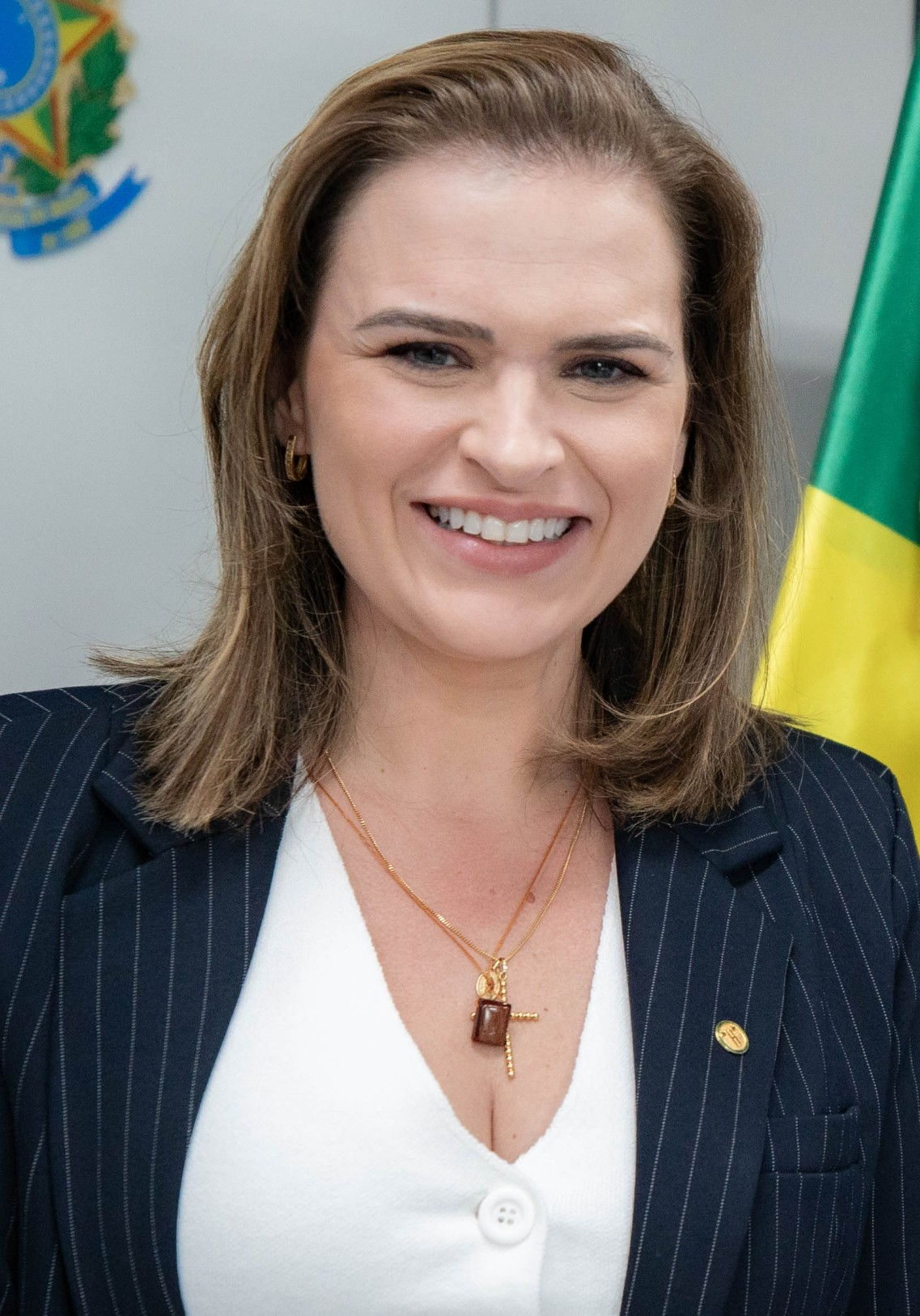

Senator-elect for Pernambuco
- Assuming office 1 February 2027

Member of the Chamber of Deputies
- In office 1 February 2019 – 1 February 2023
- Constituency: Pernambuco

Councillor of Recife
- In office 1 January 2009 – 1 February 2019
- Constituency: At-large

Personal details
- Born: Marília Valença Rocha Arraes de Alencar; April 12, 1984 (age 42) Recife, Pernambuco, Brazil
- Party: PDT (2026–present)
- Other political affiliations: PSB (2005–2016); PT (2016–2022); Solidariedade (2022–2026)
- Children: 3
- Relatives: Miguel Arraes (grandfather); Guel Arraes (uncle); Ana Arraes (aunt); Eduardo Campos (cousin); João Henrique Campos (cousin); Luisa Arraes (cousin); Pedro Campos (cousin); Maria Arraes (sister)
- Education: Federal University of Pernambuco
- Occupation: Politician; lawyer

Marília Valença Rocha Arraes de Alencar (born April 12, 1984) is a Brazilian politician, member of Democratic Labour Party (PDT) since 2022. She was a federal deputy for Pernambuco for one term (2019–23).

Between 2009-2019, she was a councillor of Recife, as a member of the Brazilian Socialist Party (PSB). She left the Workers' Party (PT) on 25 March 2022 in order to run for the 2022 Pernambuco gubernatorial election as a candidate, since the party supported the candidacy of Danilo Cabral (from the Brazilian Socialist Party).

== Early life and education ==
Marília Arraes was born in Recife. She is the daughter of psychologist Sônia Valença Rocha Arraes de Alencar and business administrator Marcos Arraes de Alencar and the granddaughter of former governor of Pernambuco Miguel Arraes. She is also a cousin of the former governor of Pernambuco Eduardo Campos and his son, mayor of Recife João Henrique Campos. She is the niece of the former deputy and minister of the Federal Court of Audits, Ana Arraes and filmmaker Guel Arraes.

On her mother's side, she is the granddaughter of one of the pioneers in child psychiatry in Brazil, Dr. Zaldo Rocha, who is also considered one of the forerunners of psychoanalysis in the country.

She graduated in Law at the Federal University of Pernambuco. She was married to Luiz Felipe Câmara de Oliveira Pontes (Felipe Francismar) and, in 2015, she gave birth to Maria Isabel Arraes de Alencar Pontes in Recife. She is currently married to André Cacau, a former councilor of the municipality of Salgueiro. The two are parents of Maria Bárbara, born in January 2022, and her third child, called Maria Magdalena, was born in March 2023.

== Political career ==
She joined the Brazilian Socialist Party (PSB) in 2005. Marília always had an active job, militating in several socialist campaigns. During law school, she became involved in the student movement, debating gender and the plurality of rights, as well as working on improvement projects for the conservation of the university's heritage.

Between 2007 and 2008, she was Pernambuco's Youth and Employment Secretary under Eduardo Campos' government. At age 24, she was elected as a councillor of Recife with 9,533 votes, being the youngest parliamentarian in the 15th legislature. During the 2009/2010 biennium, she served as the president of the Youth Public Policy Commission. In 2011, she became the first woman to chair the Commission on Legislation and Justice. In 2012, she was re-elected councillor with 8,841 votes. Shortly after the elections, she took office on the Municipal Secretariat for Youth and Professional Qualification, under Geraldo Júlio's administration.

Marília returned to the Municipal Chamber of Recife in April 2014. But, due to what she considered an "ideological shift" to the right on her political party, she resigned her candidacy as a federal deputy. She also denounced interference by the Brazilian Socialist Party leadership in the party's youth. In July of the same year, Marília announced her support for President Dilma Rousseff's candidacy for reelection. Since August 2014, she started to act as part of the opposition to the Recife's mayorship commanded by the PSB. In February 2016, she formalized her disaffiliation from the party, citing a lack of internal democracy and a change in the party's convictions and ideologies.

Soon after, Marília joins the Workers' Party (PT) of Pernambuco. The councillor had her membership card approved by former president Luiz Inácio Lula da Silva, during PT's 36th birthday party, in Rio de Janeiro. The act of affiliation took place on March 3, 2016, at the City Council of Recife.

In October 2016, Marília decided to run again in municipal elections for a third term. She was elected with 11,872 votes, one of the highest votes in the current legislature and one of the most expressive among Workers' Party politicians in the Northeast, North, South and Midwest regions. She assumed the leadership of the opposition bench at the Casa José Mariano (City Council of Recife), reaffirming her political position and her fight alongside the people of Recife in search of a better city. Committed to the party's ideals, Marília was the head of the group of parliamentarians and leaders who coordinated all the resistance against the impeachment of former president Dilma Rousseff.

In 2018, she was summoned by the militancy of Workers' Party to run on the dispute for the Government of Pernambuco. She even led the initial polls, but the project was not carried out due to the national guidelines of the party, which opted for the consolidation of an alliance with other parties and support for the reelection of the then governor, Paulo Câmara, from the Brazilian Socialist Party.

Supported by the same militancy and by numerous sectors of civil society, she entered the race for a seat in the Chamber of Deputies of Brazil. She won with a significant vote share, with 193,108 thousand votes - the second most voted federal congresswoman in the state in the 2018 elections. She is the fourth woman elected as a federal deputy in the history of Pernambuco.

She was a candidate on 2020 Recife mayoral election, by the Workers' Party. Because of the COVID-19 pandemic, the National Congress of Brazil postponed local elections (which usually happens on the month of October) to November 15, 2022 (first round) and November 30, 2022 (second round). During the first round, Arraes obtained 223,248 votes (27.95%), and then was qualified for a second round with her cousin João Campos, a member of the Brazilian Socialist Party. On November 30, 2022, on the second round of the mayoral election, Arraes was defeated after only achieving 348,126 votes (43.73%).

On March 25, 2022, she left the Workers' Party and joined Solidariedade. She assumed the state presidency of the party and announced her candidacy for governor in the 2022 Pernambuco gubernatorial election. Her name was approved at the party's state convention on July 31, 2022. On October 2, 2022 she got 1,175,651 votes (23.97%) - being the most voted candidate at the gubernatorial run - and was qualified for a second round against Raquel Lyra, a member of the Brazilian Social Democracy Party (PSDB). She was defeated on the second round by Lyra, after only being able to obtain 2,190,264 votes (41.30%). It is the first time in the history of Pernambuco that both of the candidates on the run-off were women.

== Electoral history ==
=== 2022 Pernambuco gubernatorial election ===
Election	First round					Second round			
Election	Party	Votes	%	Position	Result	Votes	%	Position	Result
2022	Solidariedade	1,175,651	23.97	No. 1	Run-off	2,190,264	41.30	No. 2	Not Elected

=== 2020 Recife mayoral election ===
Election	First round					Second round			
Election	Party	Votes	%	Position	Result	Votes	%	Position	Result
2020	PT	223,248	27.95	No. 2	Run-off	348,126	43.73	No. 2	Not Elected

=== Chamber of Deputies ===
Election
Election	Party	Votes	%	Position in Pernambuco State	Result
2018	PT	193,108	4.46	No. 2	Elected

=== Municipal Chamber of Recife ===
Election
Election	Party	Votes	%	Position in Recife Municipality	Result
2016	PT	11,872	1.38	No. 6	Re-elected
2012	PSB	8,481	0.96	No. 17	Re-elected
2008	PSB	9,533	1.12	No. 9	Elected
