= Gabriel Mota =

Brazilian politician (born 1982)

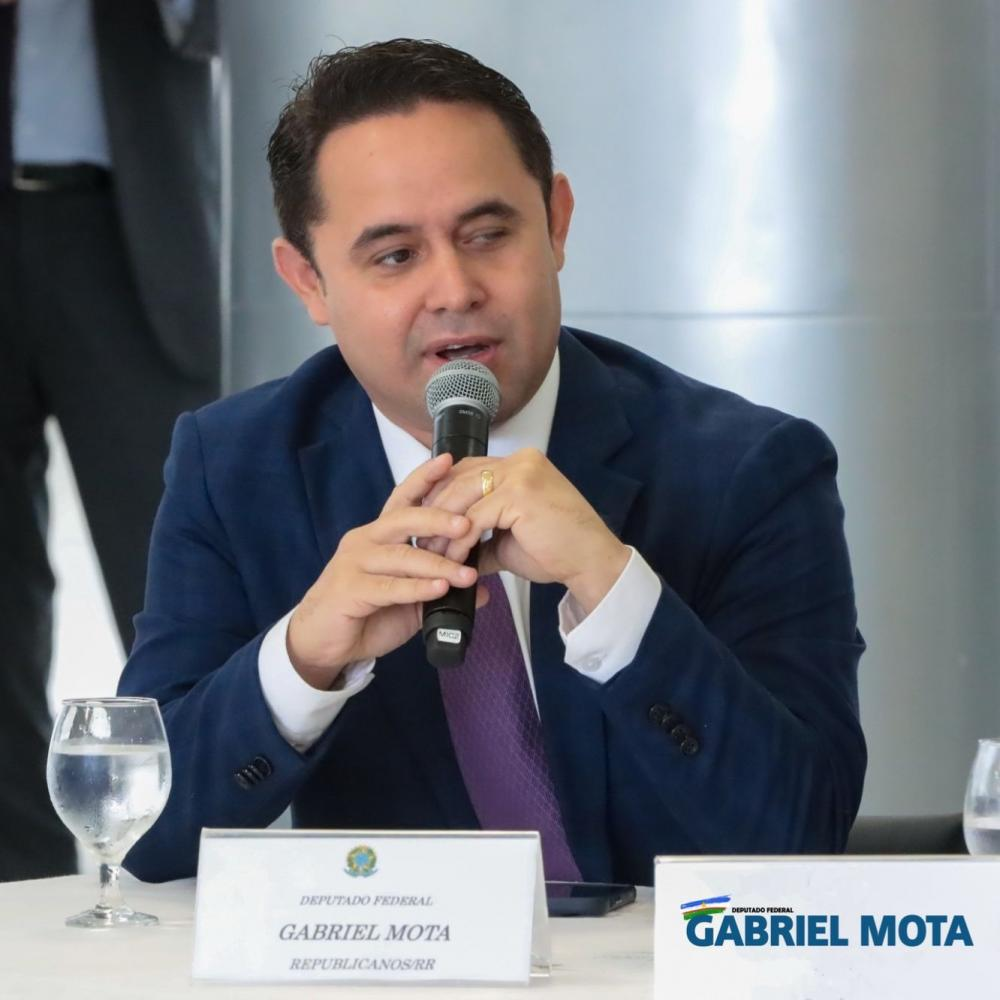
- Mota in 2023

Member of the Chamber of Deputies
- Incumbent
- Assumed office 8 March 2023
- Preceded by: Jhonatan de Jesus
- Constituency: Roraima

Personal details
- Born: 24 December 1982 (age 43)
- Party: Republicans (since 2020)

Gabriel Mota e Silva (born 24 December 1982) is a Brazilian politician serving as a member of the Chamber of Deputies since 2023. He was a municipal councillor of Boa Vista from 2015 to 2016 and from 2021 to 2023.
