= Pedro Campos =

Brazilian civil engineer and politician

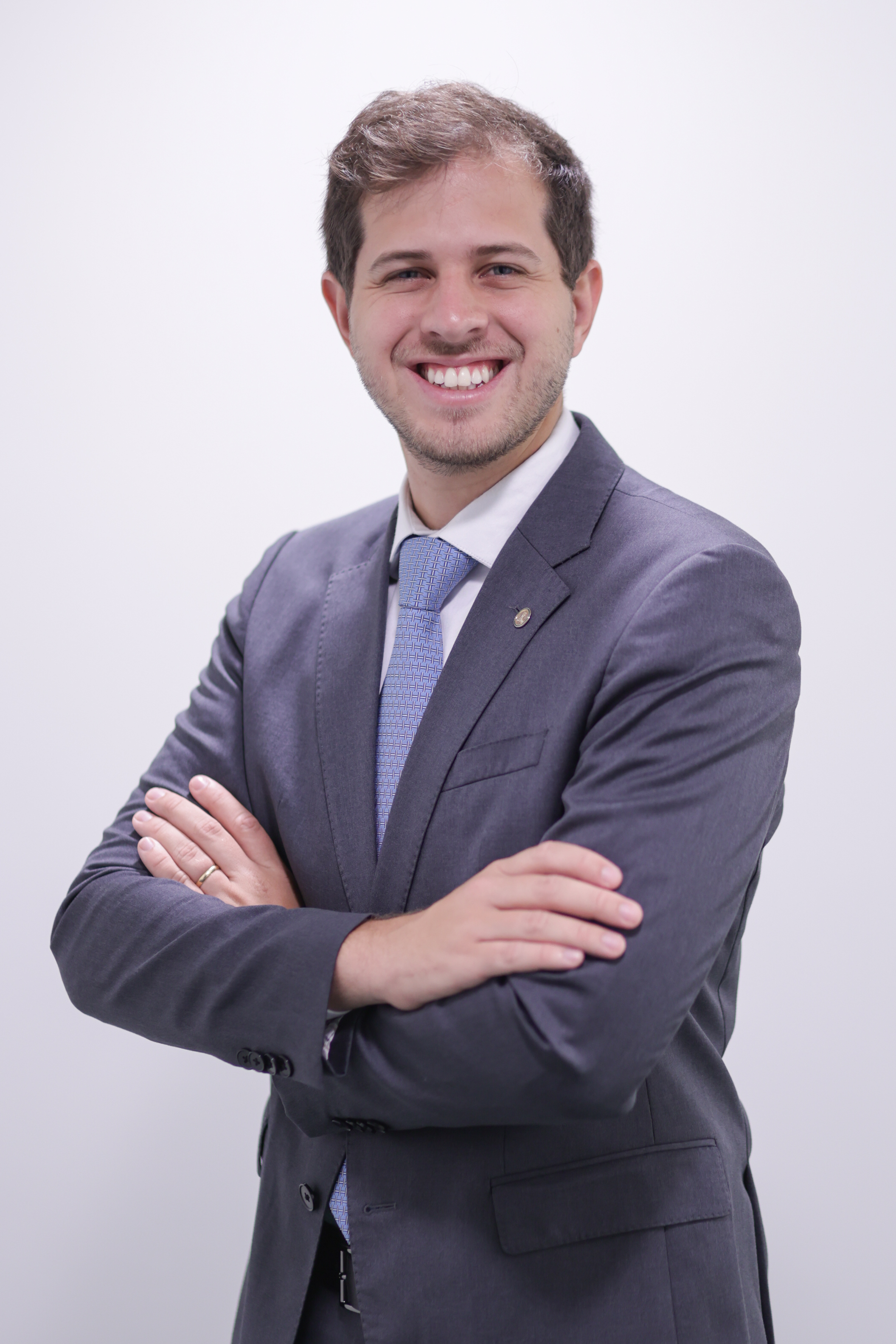

Member of the Chamber of Deputies
- Incumbent
- Assumed office 1 February 2023
- Constituency: Pernambuco

Personal details
- Born: 28 October 1995 (age 31) Recife, Pernambuco, Brazil
- Party: PSB (2013–present)
- Spouse: Augusta Carneiro
- Parent: Eduardo Campos (father)
- Relatives: João Henrique Campos (brother); Miguel Arraes (great-grandfather); Marília Arraes (cousin); Luisa Arraes (cousin)
- Education: Federal University of Pernambuco

Pedro Henrique de Andrade Lima Carneiro Campos (born 28 October 1995) is a Brazilian civil engineer and politician, affiliated with the Brazilian Socialist Party (PSB). He was elected as a federal deputy from the state of Pernambuco in 2022. He is the son of former government minister and governor of Pernambuco Eduardo Campos.

== Biography ==
Pedro Henrique is the third child of Eduardo Campos and Renata de Andrade Lima, with Renata having established a career as an economist and state auditor. His older brother, João Henrique Campos, is the current mayor of Recife. He comes from a politically prominent family in Pernambuco, with his grandmother being former federal deputy and minister of the Tribunal de Contas da União (TCU) Ana Arraes, and his great-grandfather being former governor of Pernambuco Miguel Arraes. Other relatives include his cousin, former federal deputy Marília Arraes, and his great-uncle, film director Guel Arraes. His father, while campaigning as a presidential candidate during the 2014 presidential election for the PSB, was killed when his plane crashed in poor weather in Santos, São Paulo.

Campos went to secondary school at Colégio Damas in Recife from 2010 to 2011, when he was approved to take university courses in civil engineering at just 16 years old. He was later approved for graduation at his second year in secondary school. He graduated with a degree in civil engineering from the Federal University of Pernambuco in 2018. He did study abroad at the École des Ingénieurs de la Ville de Paris, in Paris, France.

Pedro Henrique began his political career in 2022, where he became a candidate for federal deputy, receiving 172,526 votes and being elected to the position.

== Personal life ==
Campos has dated odontologist Augusta Carneiro since 2012. They met each other at a school event. They became engaged in 2021 while on vacation in São Miguel dos Milagres. They legally married on 1 November 2021, with the official religious ceremony taking place on 29 January 2022 at Igrejinha de Carneiros.

Fernando Ribeiro Carneiro Campos
Maximiano Accioly Campos
Maria do Carmo Accioly
Eduardo Campos
Miguel Arraes de Alencar
Ana Lúcia Arraes de Alencar
Célia de Souza Leão
Pedro Henrique Campos
Hisbello de Andrade Lima
Cyro de Andrade Lima
Lucilla Barbosa da Silva
Renata de Andrade Lima
Rejane Coelho de Andrade Lima
