= João Henrique Campos =

Brazilian politician

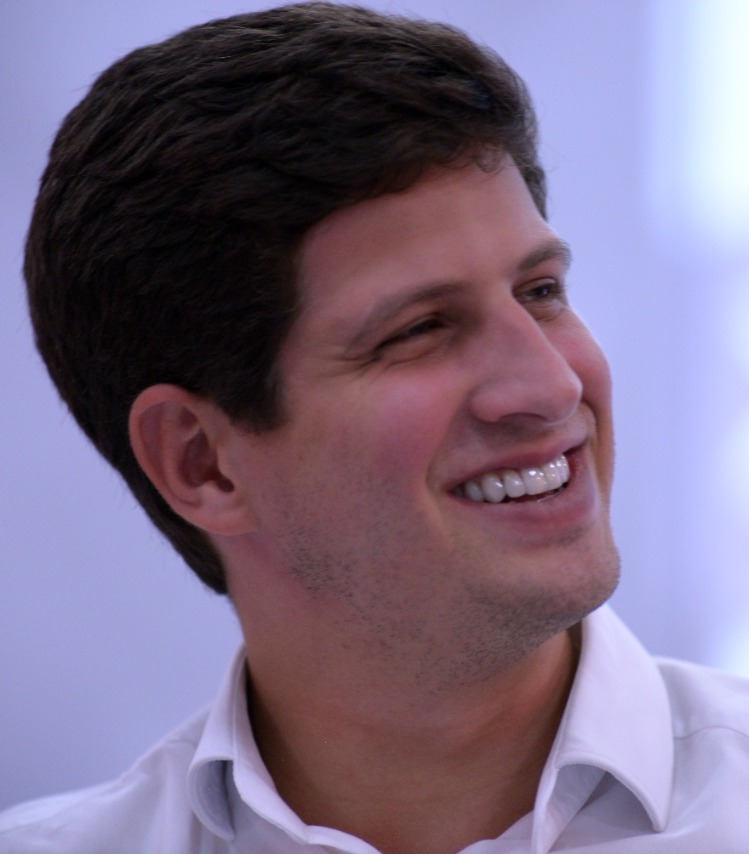
- Campos in 2022

Mayor of Recife
- In office 1 January 2021 – 2 April 2026
- Deputy: Isabella de Roldão (2021–2025); Victor Marques (2025–2026)
- Preceded by: Geraldo Júlio
- Succeeded by: Victor Marques

President of the Brazilian Socialist Party
- Incumbent
- Assumed office 1 June 2025
- Preceded by: Carlos Siqueira

Member of the Chamber of Deputies
- In office 1 February 2019 – 20 December 2020
- Constituency: Pernambuco

Personal details
- Born: 26 November 1993 (age 32) Recife, Pernambuco, Brazil
- Party: PSB (2013–present)
- Spouse: Tabata Amaral (m. 2026)
- Parent: Eduardo Campos (father)
- Relatives: Pedro Campos (brother); Ana Arraes (grandmother); Miguel Arraes (great-grandfather); Guel Arraes (great-uncle); Luisa Arraes (first cousin once removed); Marília Arraes (first cousin once removed)
- Education: Federal University of Pernambuco

João Henrique de Andrade Lima Campos (born 26 November 1993), is a Brazilian politician who served as mayor of Recife from 2021 to 2026. He was first elected as a federal deputy to the Chamber of Deputies for the state of Pernambuco during the 2018 general election as a member of the Brazilian Socialist Party (PSB). He is the son of former government minister and governor of Pernambuco Eduardo Campos.

== Early life ==
Campos was born on 26 November 1993 in Recife to Eduardo Campos and Renata de Andrade Lima, with Renata having established a career as an economist and state auditor. He comes from a politically prominent family in Pernambuco. In addition to his father, his great-grandfather Miguel Arraes was a long established political figure in Pernambuco. His brother Pedro Campos, his grandmother Ana Arraes and his cousin Marília Arraes have also been federal deputies for Pernambuco state, the latter elected to office in 2018. His great-uncle is filmmaker Guel Arraes. His father, while campaigning as a presidential candidate during the 2014 presidential election for the PSB, was killed when his plane crashed in poor weather in Santos, São Paulo.

Campos graduated with a degree in civil engineering from the Federal University of Pernambuco in 2016. He began attending university when he was 17, having been approved for graduation from high school in his second year.

== Political career ==
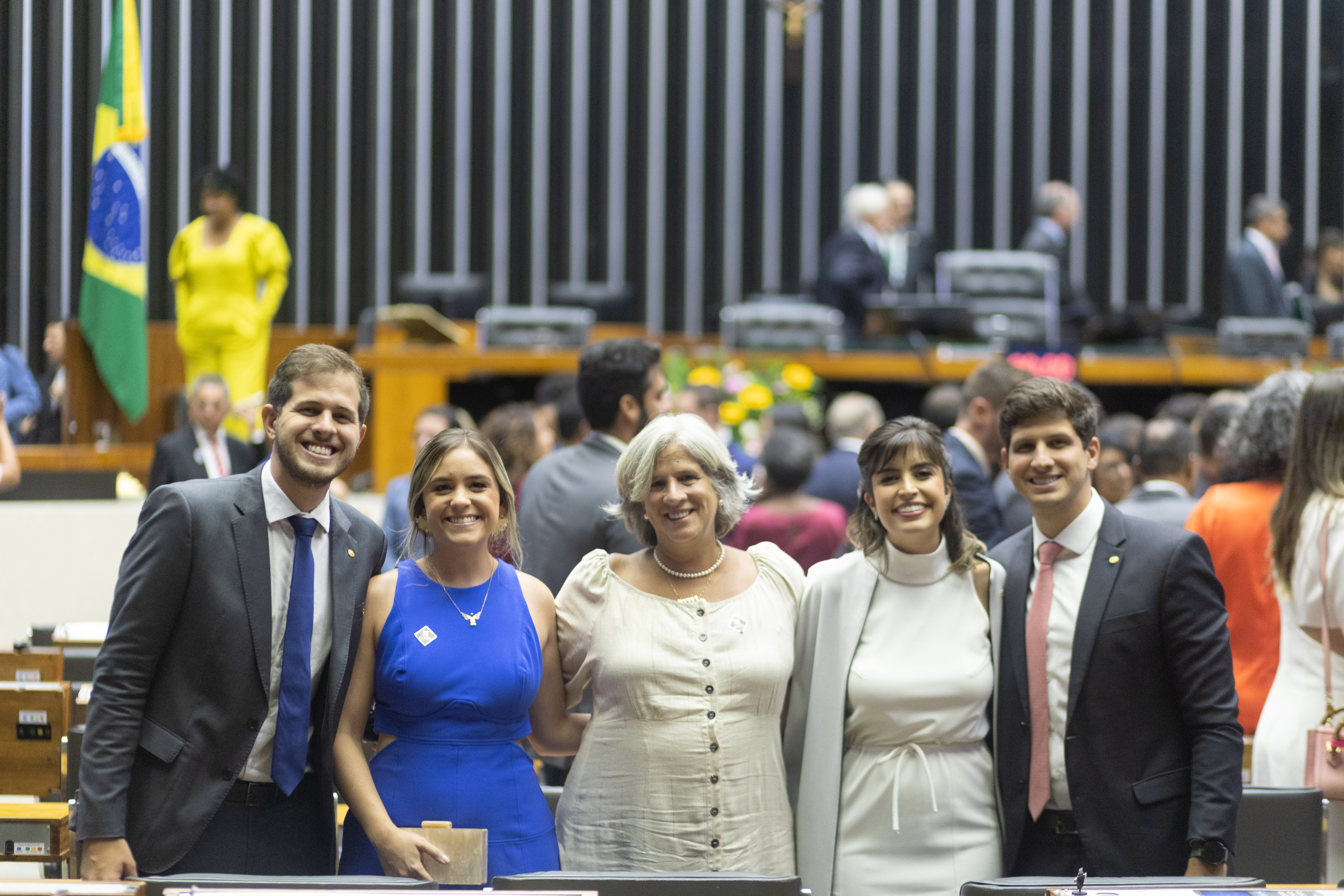
João Campos during the opening session of the 57th Legislature of the National Congress. In the image (left to right), he's followed by his brother and congressman Pedro Campos, his sister-in-law Augusta Carneiro, his mother Renata Campos and his girlfriend and congresswoman Tabata Amaral.

In 2014, Campos was elected secretary of the Pernambuco state branch of the PSB. He coordinated party meetings in the interior of the state. He later became chief of staff of the state of Pernambuco in 2016, a position once held by Campos' father. He served under governor Paulo Câmara. He was responsible for the state government's administrative agenda, as well as event planning and management.

In March 2018, he was elected national vice president of federal relations in the 14th national congress of the PSB. Later that year, during the 2018 general elections, he was elected as a federal deputy for the state of Pernambuco with 460,037 votes, becoming the federal deputy candidate with the most votes in the history of the state. He surpassed both his grandmother Ana Arraes and great-grandfather Miguel Arraes in obtaining this record.

Campos was a candidate in the 2020 Recife mayoral election for the Brazilian Socialist Party. In the first round, he received 29.13% of the vote, going on to win the second round with 56.27% of the vote. He faced his cousin Marília Arraes in the second round, with her representing the Workers' Party. He resigned from his position as a federal deputy on 20 December 2020 in order to take office. At 27, he became the youngest mayor in the city's history.

Campos was reelected in the first round in the 2024 Recife mayoral election.

== Personal life ==
Beginning in 2019, Campos has been in a relationship with fellow Socialist Party member, federal deputy, and education activist Tabata Amaral.

Ancestors of João Henrique Campos

Fernando Ribeiro Carneiro Campos
Maximiano Accioly Campos
Maria do Carmo Accioly
Eduardo Campos
Miguel Arraes de Alencar
Ana Lúcia Arraes de Alencar
Célia de Souza Leão
João Henrique Campos
Hisbello de Andrade Lima
Cyro de Andrade Lima
Lucilla Barbosa da Silva
Renata de Andrade Lima
Eusébio da Silva Coelho
Rejane Coelho de Andrade Lima
Maria da Matta Cabral de Vasconcellos

Political offices
Preceded by Geraldo Júlio	Mayor of Recife; 2021–present	Incumbent
