= Luisa Arraes =

Brazilian actress (born 1993)

- Born: Luisa Cavendish Arraes; 15 August 1993 (age 33); Rio de Janeiro, Brazil
- Occupation: Actress • author • film-maker • singer
- Years active: 2003–present
- Height: 1.60 m (5 ft 3 in)
- Partner: Caio Blat
- Parents: Guel Arraes (father); Virginia Cavendish (mother)
- Relatives: Miguel Arraes (grandfather); Eduardo Campos (cousin); Marília Arraes (cousin); João Henrique Campos (cousin); Pedro Campos (cousin)

Luisa Cavendish Arraes (born 15 August 1993) is a Brazilian actress, singer, film-maker, author and screenwriter.

== Biography ==
Luisa was born on August 15, 1993, in Rio de Janeiro, daughter of filmmaker Guel Arraes and actress Virginia Cavendish, both from Recife. She is the paternal granddaughter of Ceará politician Miguel Arraes, former governor of Pernambuco.

== Career ==
Since childhood, she had direct contact with dramaturgy, making her professional debut in a small role in the film Lisbela e o Prisioneiro, directed by her father and whose cast included her mother. In which she played the bridesmaid at Lisbela's wedding, played by Debora Falabella. In 2011, she wrote and acted in the play Queda Livre. From 2012 until the following year, Luisa took part in three seasons of Louco por Elas, a series starring Deborah Secco and Eduardo Moscovis, where she played Bárbara, a moody teenager full of insecurities. In 2013, she participated in the film A Busca, where she performed a scene with actor Wagner Moura.

However, it only became known after the romantic Laís Pimenta played it, in Babilônia, a soap opera on TV Globo, at 9:00 pm. In the plot, the actress from Rio formed a romantic pair with actor Chay Suede, becoming one of the highlights of the soap opera. She was the daughter of Aderbal Pimenta (Marcos Palmeira) with Maria José (Laila Garin), and granddaughter of Consuelo (Arlete Salles). She also works in theater, and was in the play Pedro Malzarte e a Arara Gigante together with the actor and her boyfriend, at the time, George Sauma. In 2017, in the series A Formula she shared the same role with Drica Moraes. In October, she was confirmed in the cast of the film Rasga Coração, acting again with Drica Moraes, however, this time, as daughter-in-law and mother-in-law. From 2017 to 2020, she was on show with the play Grande Sertão: Veredas, playing the character Riobaldo in his youth, later defended by Caio Blat.

In 2020, in the series Amor e Sorte, she acted, directed and wrote together with actor Caio Blat, the episode "A Beleza Salvará o Mundo", about a newly started relationship, when the couple needs to spend the entire period of social isolation together. In 2021, from November to December, she recorded the film Grande Sertão: Veredas, based on the book by Guimarães Rosa, reinvented by Guel Arraes and Jorge Furtado, this time with the role of Diadorim, in this version, the character is not even a warrior maiden nor a trans man. In 2022, she stars in the film Transe, by her step-mother Carolina Jabor and Anne Pinheiro Guimarães, alongside Johnny Massaro and Ravel Andrade. The film takes place in the context of the 2018 election and the innocent look of young people. In 2023, in May, she directed her first film, the short film Dependências, in which she also wrote, and which was born from a play she acted in in 2016. "It's a satire of the Brazilian middle class, a family that can't make ends meet. nothing when the maid doesn't show up." Her short had its premiere at the Rio Festival, where the feature film O Diabo na Rua, no Meio do Redemuinho, in which she acts, was also released, directed by Bia Lessa. In September, the children's play Suelen Nara Ian, written and directed by Débora Lamm, re-premiered, which addresses different possible family formats from the children's perspective. Together with her band "Comes & Bebes", made up of Arthur Braganti, Thiago Rebello and Gabriel Guerra, she released the band's first single, "Choque Térmico". She then recorded a participation in the feature film O Auto da Compadecida 2. In October, she recorded the biographical film O Homem de Ouro, by Mauro Lima, about police officer Mariel Mariscot, played by Renato Góes, playing actress Darlene Glória, his ex-girlfriend, with whom she had a son.

In 2024, she won her first antagonist in a soap opera, taking on the role of Blandina in No Rancho Fundo.

== Personal life ==
From 2014 to 2017 she dated actor George Sauma.

In 2017 she graduated in the Pontifical Catholic University of Rio de Janeiro.

At the end of 2017, Luísa started a romance with the actor Caio Blat.

== Filmography ==
=== Television ===
Year	Title	Role
2012–13	Louco por Elas	Bárbara Bianchi Soyetenna
2015	Babilônia	Laís Matos Pimenta
2016	Justiça	Débora Carneiro
2017	A Fórmula	Angélica Dantas (young) / Afrodite
2018	Tá no Ar: a TV na TV	Various characters (Season 5)
2018	Mister Brau	Ariel (Episode: "8 of may")
2018	Segundo Sol	Manuela Batista dos Santos Athayde (Manu)
2020	Amor e Sorte	Teresa (episode: "A Beleza Salvará o Mundo" Also screenwriter and director)
2022	Cine Holliúdy	Francisca Maciel (Season 2)
2024	No Rancho Fundo	Blandina Rivera

=== Film ===
Year	Title	Role
2003	Lisbela e o Prisioneiro	Bridesmaid
2006	Irma Vap - O Retorno	Camila
2011	O Abismo Prateado	Luciene
2013	A Busca	Liz
2014	Boa Sorte	Magali
2016	Reza a Lenda	Laura
2017	Oitavo – Filme	The Intellectual (Short-film)
2018	Aos Teus Olhos	Sofia
2018	Rasga Coração	Mil
2019	B.O.	Isabel
2022	O Amante de Júlia	Dinorah
2022	Ela e Eu	Collaborator on the script
2022	O Debate	
2022	Duetto	Cora
2022	Transe	Luisa (Also co-creator)
2023	O Diabo na Rua, no Meio do Redemuinho	Nhorinhá/ Riobaldo (young)
2023	Dependências	Director/Screenwriter
2023	Leopoldina - A Imperatriz do Brasil	Imperatriz Leopoldina (Narrator) (documentary )
2024	Grande Sertão	Diadorim
2024	O Auto da Compadecida 2	
2024	Mariel, o Homem de Ouro	Darlene Glória

== Theater ==
Year	Title	Role
2011	Queda Livre	Sofia (Also co-author)
2012	Sóbrios	Shaylee
2013	Stand Up	
2013	O Jardim Secreto	Contributor to the text
2014	Vianninha Conta o Último Combate do Homem Comum	Suzana
2014-2016	Pedro Malazarte e a Arara Gigante	Berenice (Also Creator)
2015	A Santa Joana dos Matadouros	Joana Dark (Also Creator)
2016	Dependências – Micro-teatro	Also co-creator
2017–2020	Grande Sertão: Veredas	Riobaldo (young)
2019	Suelen Nara Ian	Author
2020	Nunca Estive Aqui Antes	Luiza (Also author)
2021	Dez por Dez	20-year-old women

== Literature ==
Year	Title	Gender	Publishing company
2019	Suelen Nara Ian	Children's	Cobogó

== Discography ==
=== Singles ===
As a guest artist
Year	Title	Album
2022	"A Hora de Brilhar" (Billy Crocanty feat. Luisa Arraes)	Verão Frito - EP

As main artist
Year	Title	Album
2023	"Choque Térmico" (with band Comes & Bebes)	–

== Awards and nominations ==
Year	Award	Category	Work nominated	Result
2013	Prêmio Contigo! de TV	Best Revelation	Louco por Elas	Nominated
2014	Prêmio Questão de Crítica	Best Cast	Vianinha Conta o Último Combate	Won
2015	Prêmio Quem de Televisão	Best Revelation	Babilônia	Nominated
2015	Melhores do Ano NaTelinha	Breakthrough actor or actress	Babilônia	Nominated
2015	Capricho Awards	Pegação Trophy (with Chay Suede)	Babilônia	Nominated
2018	Prêmio Botequim Cultural	Best Supporting Actress	Grande Sertão: Veredas	Nominated
2018	Prêmio Cenym de Teatro	Best Supporting Actress	Grande Sertão: Veredas	Nominated
2018	Prêmio Cenym de Teatro	Best Cast	Grande Sertão: Veredas	Nominated
2019	Prêmio APTR	Best Supporting Actress	Grande Sertão: Veredas	Nominated
2019	Prêmio Botequim Cultural	Best Children's Show	Suelen Nara Ian	Nominated
2019	Prêmio Botequim Cultural	Best Author (Original/Adapted)	Suelen Nara Ian	Nominated
2019	Prêmio CBTIJ de Teatro para Crianças	Best Show	Suelen Nara Ian	Nominated
2019	Prêmio CBTIJ de Teatro para Crianças	Best Original Text	Suelen Nara Ian	Won
2022	Cabíria Festival	Award Cabíria de Roteiro	Vedetes do Subúrbio	Won
2022	Cabíria Festival	Award Abra 40+	Vedetes do Subúrbio	Won
2022	Melhores do Ano	Series Actress	Cine Holliúdy	Nominated
2023	Festival Sesc Melhores Filmes	Best National Actress	Duetto	Nominated
2023	Festival do Rio	Best Short-film (novos rumos)	Dependências	Won
2023	Festival de Cinema da Fronteira	Best film (shows short-films)	Dependências	Won
