= Johnathan de Jesus =

Brazilian politician

Jhonatan de Jesus
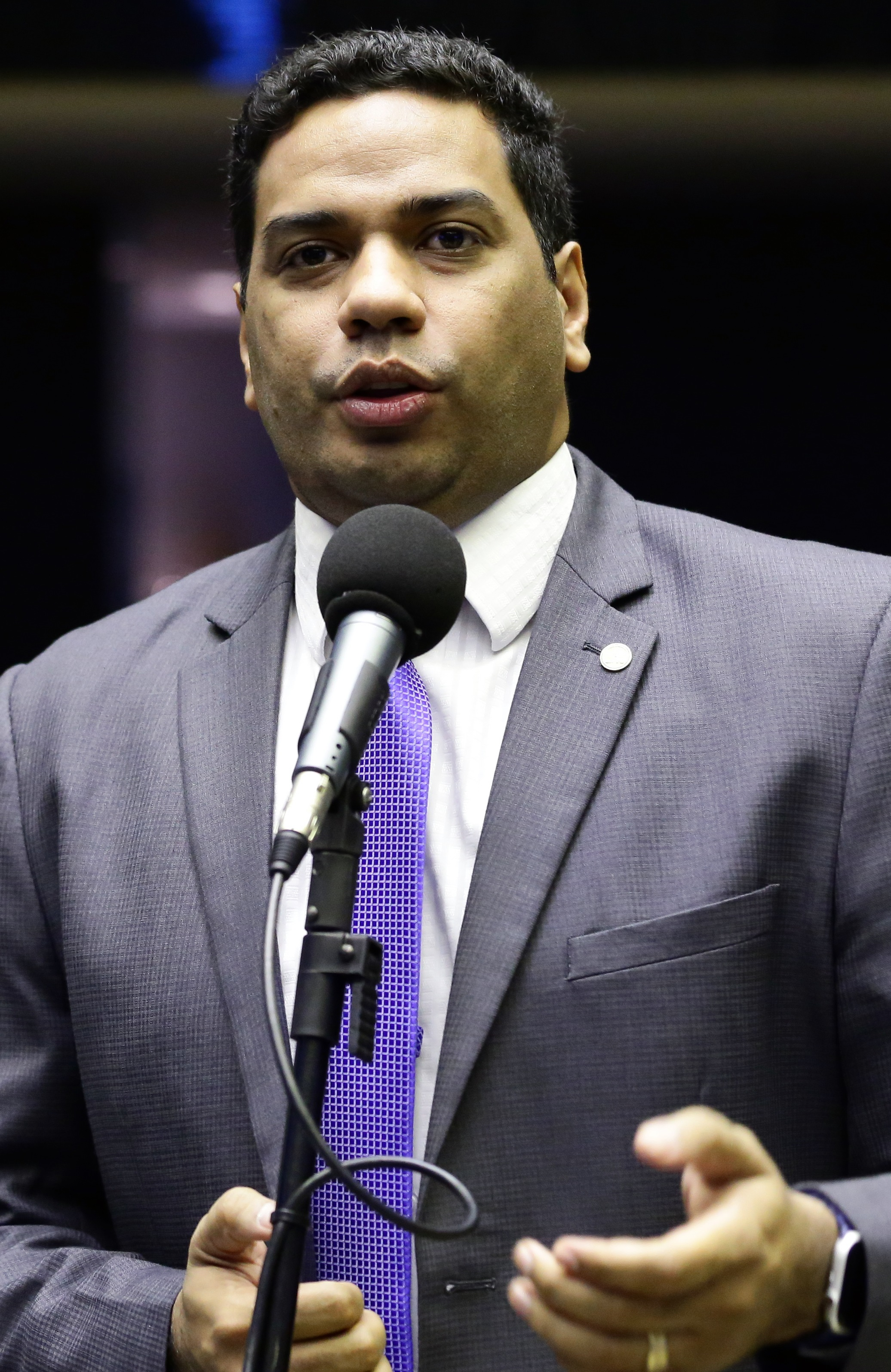

Minister of the Federal Court of Accounts
- Incumbent
- Assumed office 15 March 2023
- Nominated by: Luiz Inácio Lula da Silva
- Preceded by: Ana Arraes

Member of the Chamber of Deputies
- In office 1 February 2011 – 12 March 2023
- Succeeded by: Gabriel Mota
- Constituency: Roraima

Personal details
- Born: Jhonatan Pereira de Jesus; 3 September 1983 (age 43) Boa Vista, Roraima, Brazil
- Party: Republicanos (2009–2023)

Jhonatan Pereira de Jesus (born 3 September 1983) is a Brazilian politician. He has spent his political career representing Roraima, having served as state representative since 2015.

== Biography ==
Jhonatan de Jesus was born to Mecias de Jesus and Luzeni Carvalho Ribeiro. Before he became a politician, Santos briefly worked as a physician and bushinessman.

== Political career ==
He held the position of federal deputy between 2014 and 2023, having been elected by the Republicans (PRB) in the 2014 elections and re-elected in 2018 elections.

In 2017, he became chairman of the Mines and Energy Commission of the Brazilian Chamber of Deputies.

=== Minister of TCU ===
In 2023, the federal deputy was appointed by the Chamber of Deputies to be Minister of the Tribunal de Contas da União (TCU), succeeding Minister Ana Arraes in the position .

== Personal life ==
de Jesus and his family belong to the Nova Vida Baptist church.

Political offices
Preceded by Ana Arraes	Minister of the Federal Court of Accounts; 2023–present	Incumbent
