= Catholic University of Salvador =

Private non-profit university in Salvador, Bahia

- Universidade Católica do Salvador
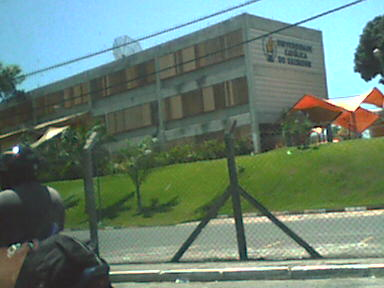
- Other names: UCSal
- Motto: Veritati
- Motto in English: True
- Type: Private, non-profit
- Established: October 19, 1961
- Affiliations: Roman Catholic Church
- Chancellor: Dom Sérgio Rocha
- Rector: Silvana Sá de Carvalho
- Vice rector: Giorgio Borghi
- Academic staff: 537
- Students: 13,220
- Undergraduates: 12,240
- Postgraduates: 980
- Other students: 580 other employees
- Location: Salvador, Bahia, Brazil
- Campus: Urban
- Colors: Orange and blue
- Website: www.ucsal.br

The Catholic University of Salvador (Portuguese: Universidade Católica do Salvador, UCSal) is a private and non-profit Catholic university, located in Salvador, the first capital of Brazil, and fourth largest city of Brazil. It is maintained by the Catholic Archdiocese of Salvador.

== Undergraduate Courses ==
Professions
Course	Campus
Law	Federação
Philosophy	Federação
History	Federação
Geography	Federação
Pedagogy	Federação
Social service	Federação
Theology	Federação
Social communication	Lapa
Letters	Lapa
Executive Secretary	Lapa
Visual Arts	Centro
Music	Centro
Business Administration	Pituaçu
Biological Sciences	Pituaçu
Accounting	Pituaçu
Economics	Pituaçu
Physical Education	Pituaçu
Nursing	Pituaçu
Civil Engineering	Pituaçu
Physiotherapy	Pituaçu
Mathematics	Pituaçu
Computers	Pituaçu
Technology Graduation	Garibaldi

== Postgraduate lato sensu Courses ==
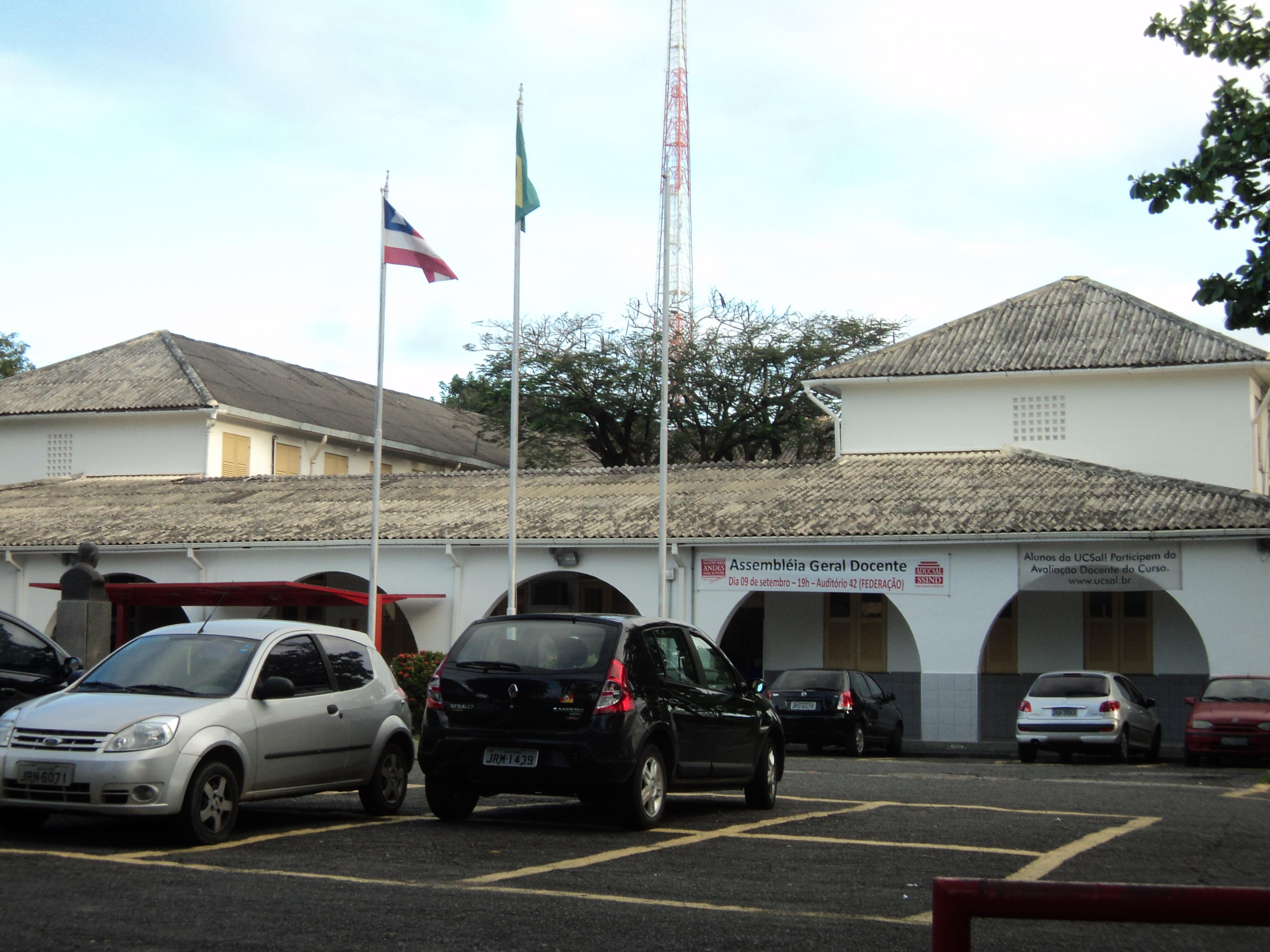
Entrance to the campus of the Federação neighborhood, Law School.

Professions
Course	Campus
Law	Federação
Education and Society	Federação
Environment	Federação
Business	Federação
Health	Federação
Theology	Federação
Engineering and Exact Sciences	Federação
Pastoralist communication	Federação

== Postgraduate stricto sensu Courses ==
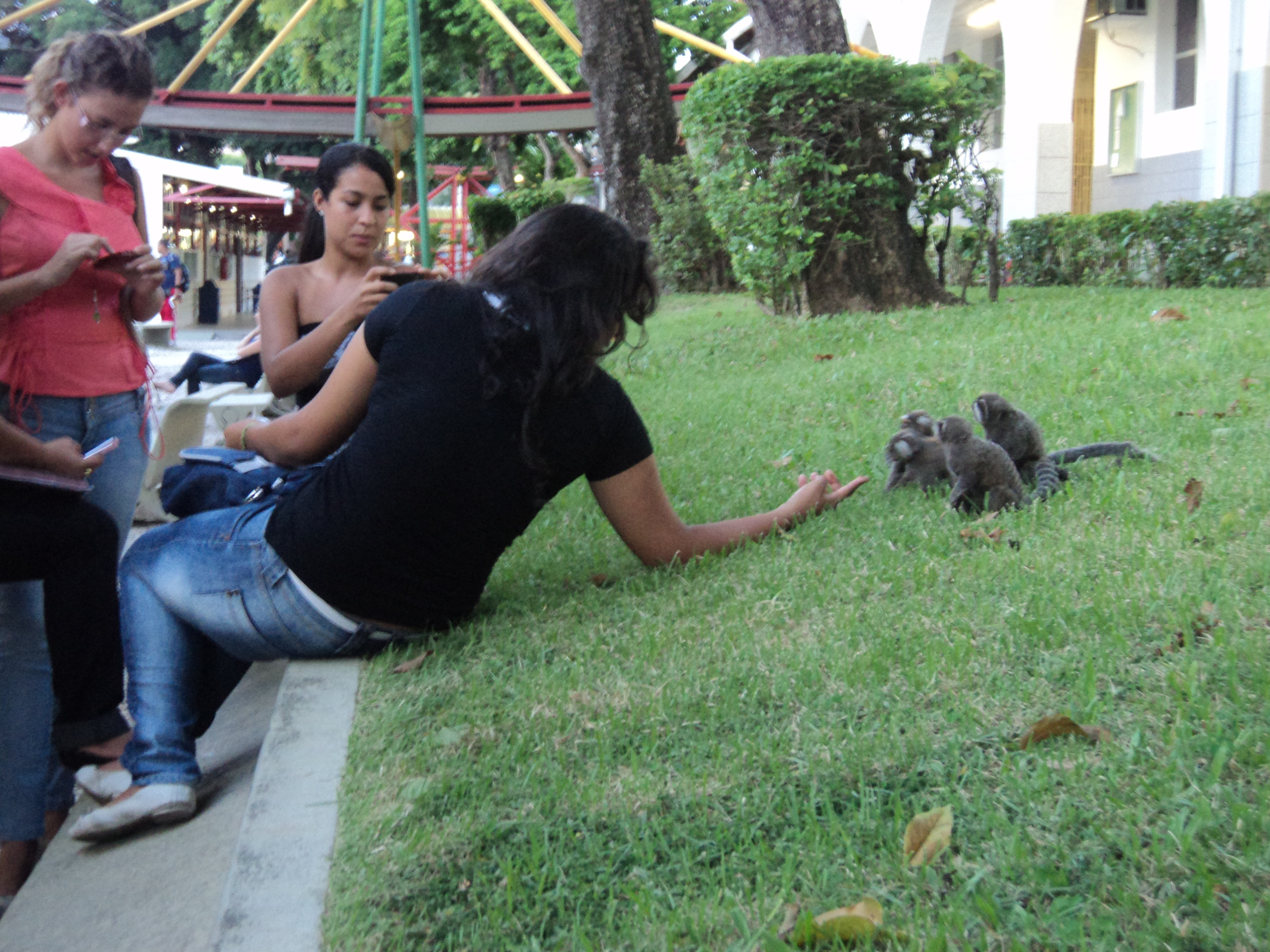
Callitrichidaes in the university.

=== Master Degree ===
Professions
Course	Campus
Law	Pituaçu
Social Policy and Citizenship	Federação
Territorial Planning and Social Development	Federação
Environmental Planning	Federação
Family in Contemporary Society	Federação

=== Doctorate Degree ===
Professions
Course	Campus
Family in Contemporary Society	Federação
Territorial Planning and Social Development	Federação

== Notable alumni ==
=== Alumni ===
Notable Catholic University of Salvador alumni include:

- Augusto Aras, current prosecutor general of Brazil
- Luislinda Valois, jurist, former Desembargadora of the State of Bahia, former secretary of promotion of racial equality and former minister of human rights
- Otto Alencar, senator from Bahia
- Ana Arraes, vice president of the Tribunal de Contas da União
- João Henrique Carneiro, politician and former mayor of Salvador
- Bruno Soares Reis, politician and current mayor of Salvador after Antônio Carlos Magalhães Neto
- Daniel Almeida, current member of the Chamber of Deputies in Brazil representing the State of Bahia
- Claudia Leitte, axé and pop singer
- João José Reis, writer and one of the most important historians in Brazil, considered a world reference for the study of history and slavery in the 19th century
- Cristiano Chaves de Farias, Prosecutor of the Public Prosecutor's Office of the State of Bahia and writer
- José Medrado, lecturer and medium, founder of Centro Espírita Cavaleiros da Luz (Knights of Light Spiritist Center)
- Moema Gramacho, former mayor of Lauro de Freitas and member of the Chamber of Deputies representing the State of Bahia
