= Ana Arraes =

Brazilian lawyer (born 1947)

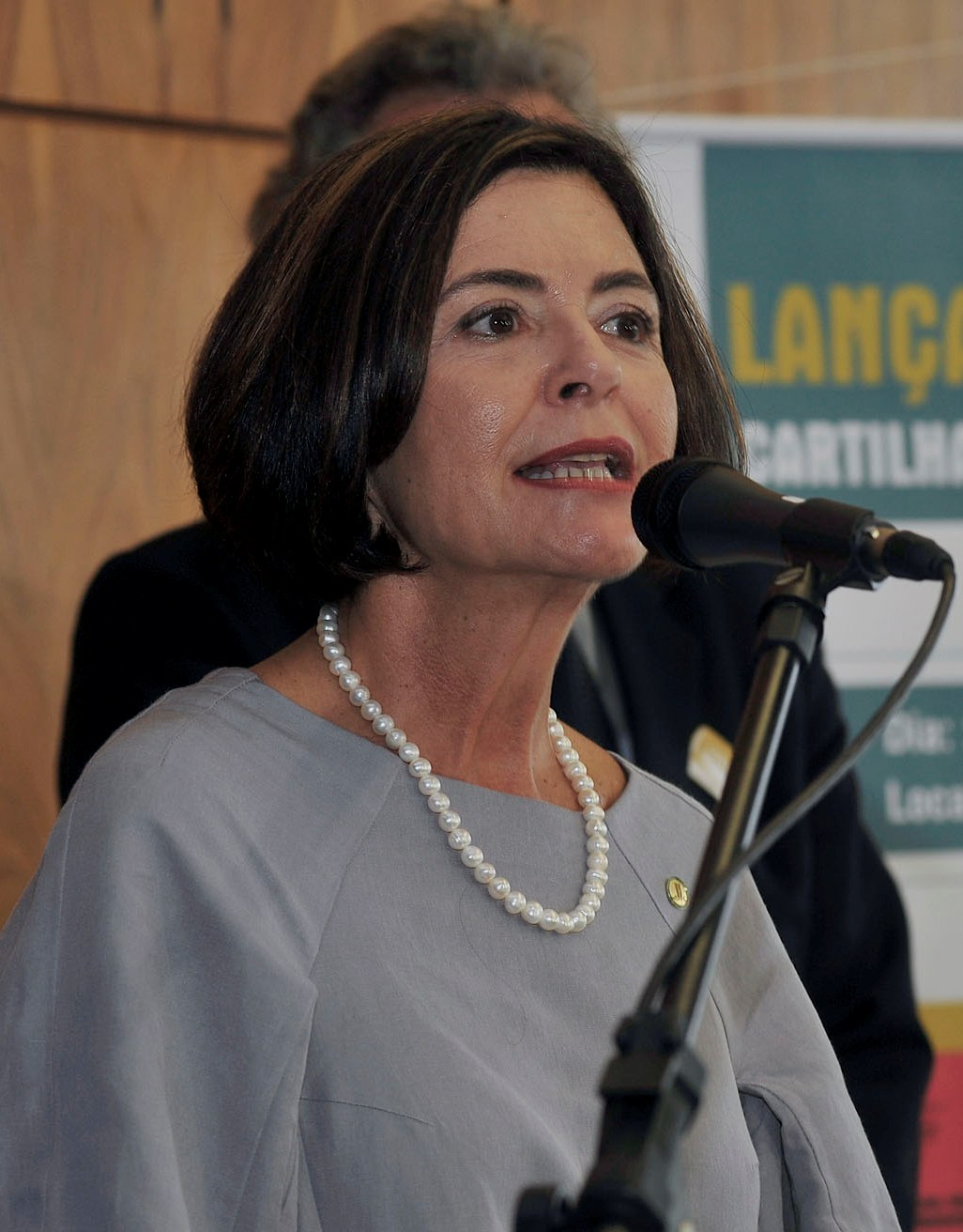

Minister of the Federal Court of Accounts
- In office 20 October 2011 – 25 July 2022
- Appointed by: Dilma Rousseff
- Preceded by: Ubiratan Aguiar
- Succeeded by: Jhonatan de Jesus

Federal deputy of Pernambuco
- In office 1 February 2007 – 20 October 2011

Personal details
- Born: Ana Lúcia Arraes de Alencar; 28 July 1947 (age 79) Recife, Brazil
- Party: PSB (1990–2011)
- Spouse: Maximiano Campos
- Children: 2, including Eduardo
- Relatives: Guel Arraes (brother); João Henrique Campos (grandson); Pedro Campos (grandson); Marília Arraes (great-niece)
- Education: Catholic University of Salvador

Ana Lúcia Arraes de Alencar (born 28 July 1947) is a Brazilian judge and former politician. She was a federal deputy for the state of Pernambuco from 2007 to 2011, and later became a minister of the Tribunal de Contas da União (TCU) from 2011 to 2022, presiding over the court from 2020 to 2022. A member of the politically prominent Arraes family, her son was former government minister and governor of Pernambuco Eduardo Campos.

== Early life and family ==
Arraes is the daughter of prominent politician and former governor of Pernambuco Miguel Arraes (1916–2005) and Célia de Sousa Leão (1924–1961), and has a brother, filmmaker Guel Arraes. From her marriage to writer Maximiano Campos (1941–1998), she had two sons: Eduardo Campos (1965–2014), who was killed in a plane crash, and lawyer, writer, member of the Academia Pernambucana de Letras, and candidate for the mayoralty of Olinda, Antônio Campos (born 1968). She is the aunt of Marília Arraes and grandmother of João Henrique Campos.

In July 1964, during the time she was preparing for her wedding at 17, she drove to meet with general Olímpio Mourão Filho, one of the leaders of the 1964 Brazilian coup d'état and at that time the commander of the Northeastern Military Command, to ask for her father, who had been jailed in Fernando de Noronha. Her pleas were granted, as her wedding occurred in a chapel at the Recife Air Base on 9 August 1964, surrounded by soldiers. Her father was able to arrive by a Brazilian Air Force plane and, soon after the ceremony, was once again sent to prison in Fernando de Noronha.

== Career ==
She became a member of the Brazilian Socialist Party (PSB) in 1990, during the same time her father also joined the party.

She graduated with a law degree from the Law School of Olinda in 1993, transferring in 1996 to the Catholic University of Salvador, where she graduated in 1998.

She was an assistant at the Institute of Documentation at the Fundação Joaquim Nabuco from 1986 to 1990, secretary of the council of the Tribunal das Contas of the State of Pernambuco from 1990 to 1996, a judicial official with the Regional Labor Court of the 6th region from 1995 to 1998, and was also a parliamentary secretary with the federal Chamber of Deputies from 1998 to 2006.

In 2006, she was first elected as a federal deputy from Pernambuco for the PSB, with 178,467 votes and becoming the third most voted candidate from her state. In 2010, she was reelected with 387,581 votes, obtaining the largest vote share in Pernambuco and the fifth largest in all of Brazil.

She was the second female federal deputy in Pernambuco's history, the first being Cristina Tavares. However, she was the first to be elected in the 21st century.

On 21 September 2011, she was nominated by the Chamber of Deputies to be a minister in the Tribunal de Contas da União (TCU), assuming the empty chair left by the retiring by minister Ubiratan Aguiar and becoming the second woman ever to serve as a minister on the court, the first being Élvia Castello Branco. In December 2018, she became the vice-president of the court, with José Múcio, as president. After his retirement on 31 December 2020, she became the president of the court

Arraes retired from the court on 25 July 2022, and was succeeded by Jhonatan de Jesus.
