= Simone Morgado =

Brazilian politician (born 1967)

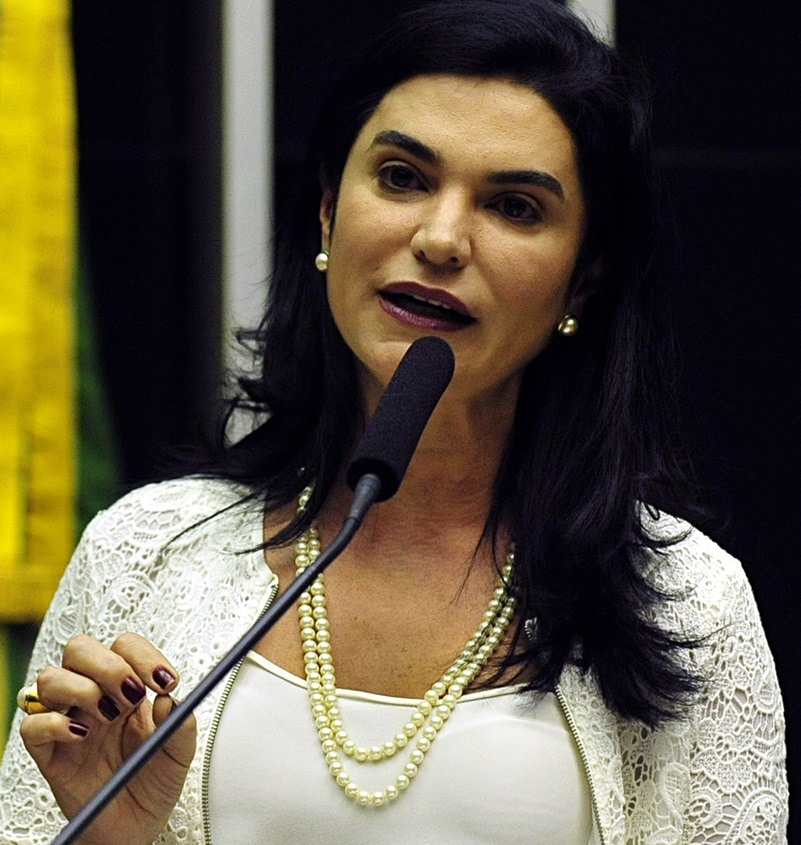
- Morgado in November 2015

Federal Deputy from Pará
- In office 1 February 2015 – 31 January 2019

State Deputy of Pará
- In office 1 February 2007 – 31 January 2015

Vereador of Bragança
- In office 2005–2007

Personal details
- Born: 7 April 1967 (age 59) Belém, Pará, Brazil
- Party: PDMB

Simone Maria Morgado Ferreira (born 6 April 1967) is a Brazilian politician and economist. She has spent her political career representing her home state of Pará, having served as federal deputy representative from 2015 to 2019.

== Personal life ==
Morgado was born to Hilário Augusto Ferreira Filho and Maria Amália Morgado Ferreira. In addition to being a politician, Morgado has also worked as an economist. She is the spouse of fellow politician Jader Barbalho.

== Political career ==
Morgado voted against the impeachment of then-president Dilma Rousseff. Morgado voted against the 2015 tax reforms but in favor of the 2017 Brazilian labor reform, and would vote against the opening of a corruption investigation into Rousseff's successor Michel Temer. Morgado was one of the strongest supporters of Temer against his corruption allegations.
