= Guel Arraes =

Brazilian filmmaker and TV director

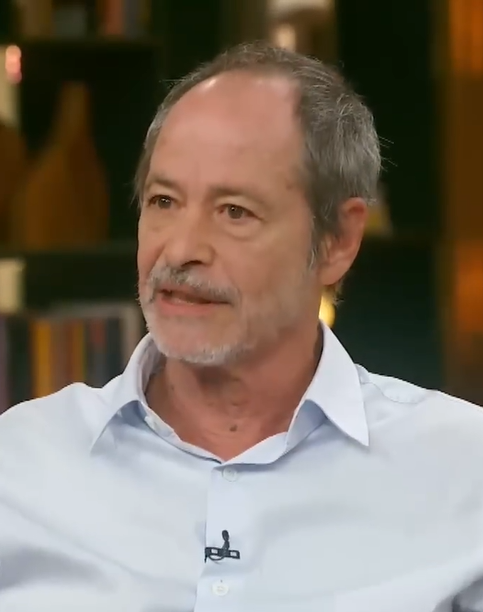
- Arraes in 2026
- Born: Miguel Arraes de Alencar Filho; 12 December 1953 (age 72); Recife, Brazil
- Occupations: Filmmaker, TV director
- Years active: 1981–present
- Partners: Andréa Beltrão (1984–1987); Louise Cardoso (1987–1990); Virginia Cavendish (1991–2001); Carolina Jabor (2003–present)
- Children: Luisa Arraes
- Relatives: Ana Arraes (sister); Eduardo Campos (nephew); Marília Arraes (niece); João Henrique Campos (great-nephew); Pedro Campos (great-nephew)

Miguel Arraes de Alencar Filho, known as Guel Arraes (born 12 December 1953) is a Brazilian filmmaker and TV director.

Until 2018, he was the director of weekly dramas at Rede Globo, being mainly responsible for the series and miniseries made by the network. Since then, he still continues to contribute, write and direct projects.

== Biography ==
Arraes is the son of former governor of the state of Pernambuco Miguel Arraes and brother to Ana Arraes. He had lived for a time with his family in exile in Algeria during the military dictatorship. In 1972, he matriculated at the University of Paris, majoring in anthropology and becoming a member of the Ethnographic Film Committee, led by Jean Rouch. There, he worked as a projectionist, archivist, and editor. Arraes became part of Rede Globo in 1981 as co-director of the novela Jogo da Vida, created by Silvio de Abreu. He would later direct the novelas Guerra dos Sexos (1983) and Vereda Tropical (1984). The following year, he directed the hit series Armação Ilimitada.

=== Personal life ===
In 1993, he and his wife, actress and film director Virginia Cavendish, had their child Luisa Arraes. In 2001, Arraes and Cavendish separated after having been married for 10 years. Despite separating, she invited him to direct in the film Lisbela e o Prisioneiro, where she would produce and also act in. He has been married to Carolina Jabor, the daughter of Arnaldo Jabor, since 2003.

== Filmography ==
=== As director ===
- 1986 - 1988 Armação Ilimitada
- 1988 - TV Pirata
- 1991 - Doris para Maiores
- 1997 - A Comédia da Vida Privada
- 2000 - A Dog's Will
- 2001 - Caramuru - A Invenção do Brasil
- 2003 - Lisbela e o Prisioneiro
- 2008 - Romance
- 2010 - O Bem Amado
- 2010 - Papai Noel Existe - Writer
- 2011 - Esquenta!
- 2024 - Grande Sertão
- 2024 - O Auto da Compadecida 2

=== As producer ===
- 2000 - A Dog's Will
- 2001 - Caramuru - A Invenção do Brasil
- 2003 - Lisbela e o Prisioneiro
- 2003 - So Normal
- 2004 - Meu Tio Matou um Cara
- 2005 - O Coronel e o Lobisomem

== Awards ==
- Best Director and Best Screenwriter Awards, as part of the Grande Prêmio Cinema Brasil for A Dog's Will (2000);
- Public Award, at the Miami Brazilian Cinema Festival, for A Dog's Will (2000)
- EPFTV Prize: best directing for A Dog's Will, in 1999; best comedy for Os Normais in 2001 and again in 2002; best comedy for A Grande Família in 2003; Was also nominated for the award for best adapt script for Ó Paí Ó in 2008.
