= Miguel Arraes =

Brazilian lawyer and politician

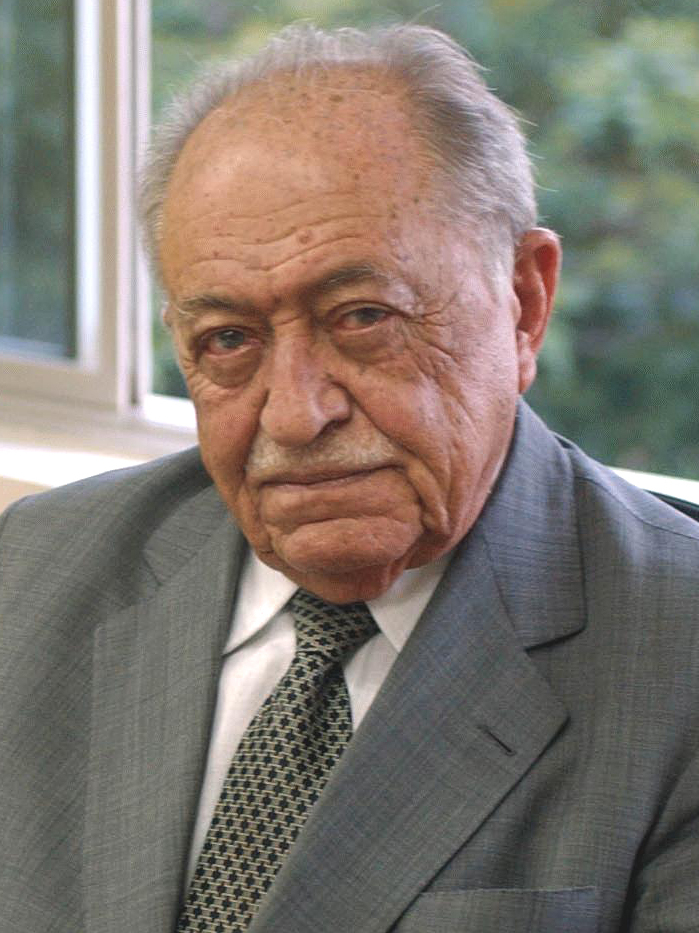

Member of the Chamber of Deputies
- In office 1 February 2003 – 21 July 2005
- Constituency: Pernambuco
- In office 1 February 1991 – 1 January 1995
- Constituency: Pernambuco
- In office 1 February 1983 – 1 February 1987
- Constituency: Pernambuco

Governor of Pernambuco
- In office 1 January 1995 – 1 January 1999
- Lieutenant: Jorge Gomes
- Preceded by: Joaquim Francisco
- Succeeded by: Jarbas Vasconcelos
- In office 15 March 1987 – 1 April 1990
- Lieutenant: Carlos Wilson
- Preceded by: Gustavo Krause
- Succeeded by: Carlos Wilson
- In office 31 January 1963 – 2 April 1964
- Lieutenant: Paulo Guerra
- Preceded by: Cid Sampaio
- Succeeded by: Paulo Guerra

Mayor of Recife
- In office 1 January 1960 – 1 January 1963
- Preceded by: Pelópidas da Silveira
- Succeeded by: Liberato Costa Júnior

State Deputy of Pernambuco
- In office 11 March 1951 – 11 March 1959
- Constituency: At-large

Personal details
- Born: Miguel Arraes de Alencar; 15 December 1916 Araripe, Ceará, Brazil
- Died: 13 August 2005 (aged 88) Recife, Pernambuco, Brazil
- Party: PSD (1950–1959); PST (1959–1964); PMDB (1979–1988); PSDB (1988–1990); PSB (1990–2005)
- Spouses: Célia de Sousa Leão (m. 1945; died 1961) Maria Magdalena Fiúza (m. 1963)
- Children: 10
- Relatives: Ana Arraes (daughter); Guel Arraes (son); Eduardo Campos (grandson); Luisa Arraes (granddaughter); Marília Arraes (granddaughter); João Henrique Campos (great-grandson); Pedro Campos (great-grandson)
- Education: Law School of Recife (LL.B.)

Miguel Arraes de Alencar (15 December 1916 – 13 August 2005) was a Brazilian lawyer and politician. He was mayor of Recife, State Deputy, Federal Deputy and three times Governor of Pernambuco.

== Birth ==
Arraes was born in Araripe in the state of Ceará, but moved to Pernambuco after graduating from the Federal University of Rio de Janeiro Faculty of Law.

== Imprisonment and exile ==
In the military takeover of the government of Brazil in 1964 Arraes was jailed and exiled. He initially refused to resign as governor of Pernambuco and was jailed by the military government in a political prison on the island of Fernando de Noronha. Arraes remained in prison for 11 months before being granted asylum in Algeria. He remained there for 14 years and returned to Brazil in 1979.

== See also ==
- List of mayors of Recife

Political offices
Preceded by Pelópidas da Silveira	Mayor of Recife; 1960–63	Succeeded by Liberato da Costa Júnior
Preceded by Cid Sampaio	Governor of Pernambuco; 1963–64; 1987–90; 1995–99	Succeeded by Paulo Pessoa Guerra
Preceded by Gustavo Krause	Governor of Pernambuco; 1963–64; 1987–90; 1995–99	Succeeded by Carlos Wilson
Preceded by Joaquim Francisco	Governor of Pernambuco; 1963–64; 1987–90; 1995–99	Succeeded by Jarbas Vasconcelos
Party political offices
New political party	PST nominee for Governor of Pernambuco; 1962	Party dissolved
Preceded by Marcos Freire	PMDB nominee for Governor of Pernambuco; 1982	Succeeded by Jarbas Vasconcelos
New political party	PSB nominee for Governor of Pernambuco; 1994, 1998	Succeeded by Dilton da Conti
