= Federal University of Pernambuco =

Public university in Recife, Brazil

- Universidade Federal de Pernambuco
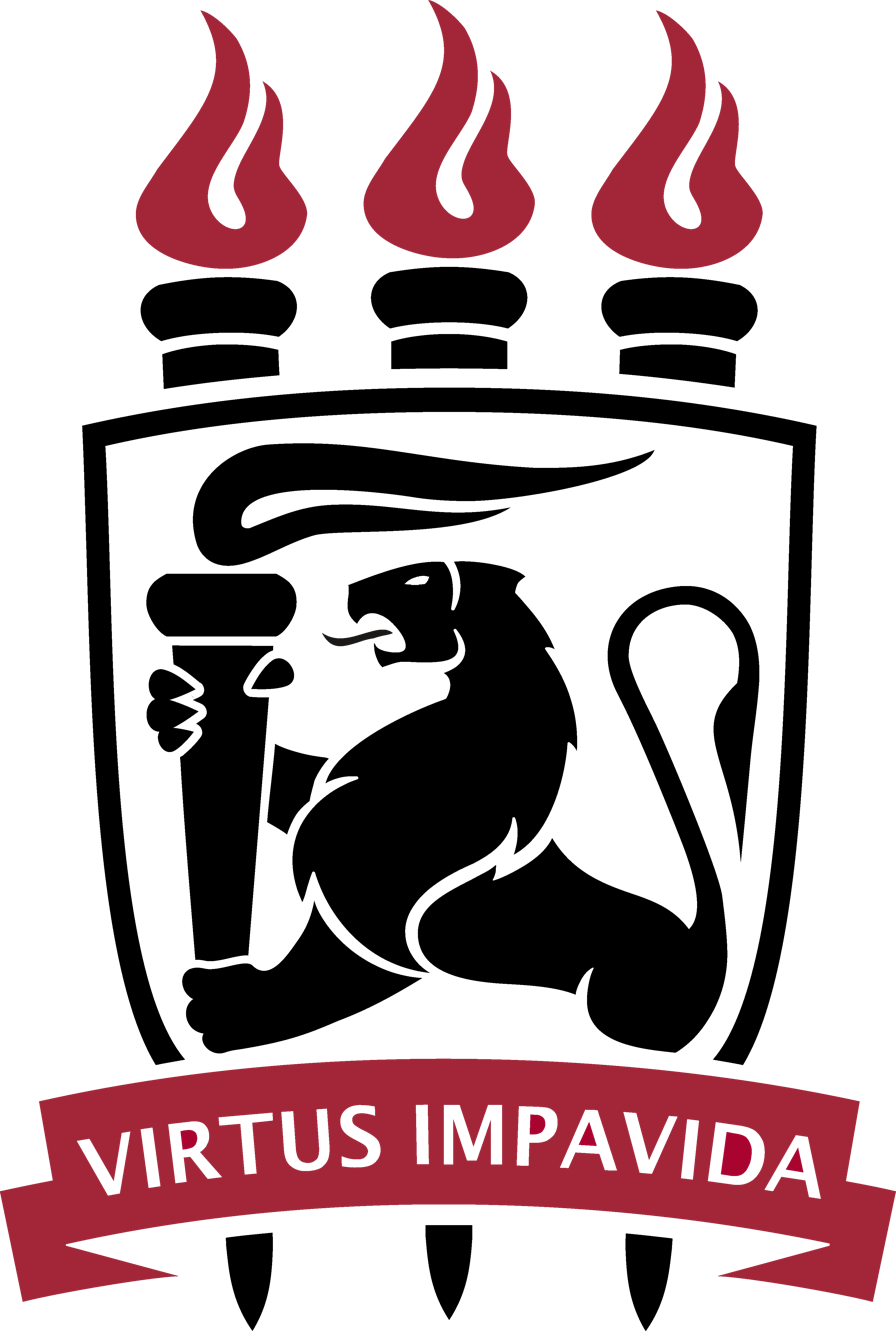
- Other name: UFPE
- Motto: Virtus impavida
- Motto in English: Fearless virtue
- Type: Public
- Established: 1946 (law school dates from 1827)
- Budget: R$ 1,227,858,265.00 (2014)
- Rector: Alfredo Macedo Gomes
- Administrative staff: 1,670 academic, technical 9,400
- Students: 43,375
- Undergraduates: 30,678
- Postgraduates: 12,697
- Location: Recife, Pernambuco, Brazil; 8°3′6″S 34°57′3″W
- Campus: Urban, 354,909 square meters
- Colors: crimson cream
- Website: official site

Federal University of Pernambuco (Portuguese: Universidade Federal de Pernambuco, UFPE) is a public university in Recife, Brazil, established in 1946. UFPE has 70 undergraduate courses and 175 postgraduate courses. As of 2007, UFPE had 35,000 students and 2,000 professors. The university has three campuses: Recife, Vitória de Santo Antão, and Caruaru. Its main campus, Campus Reitor Joaquim Amazonas, is located in western Recife, in the Cidade Universitária neighborhood. The Recife Law School, established in 1827, is located downtown.

UFPE ranks among the top Brazilian universities, placing ninth in the country in size and scientific production, and seventh among the federal public universities. UFPE's Center for Exact and Natural Sciences is consistently the strongest in research production in the university.

UFPE has twice elected the best university in Northern and Northeastern Brazil by Guia do Estudante and Banco Real (ABN AMRO).

Each year over 6,000 seats are offered in its vestibular. The median and average competition rate is of about 10 applicants for each seat.

== History ==
Olinda Law School can be considered UFPE's precursor. It was created by Pedro I and is, along with the University of São Paulo Law School, founded on the same day, the oldest law school in the country. Afterwards, it was transferred to Recife. In 1895 the School of Engineering of Pernambuco also started to function. These two faculties/free schools, and those of Medicine (1927), Philosophy currently known as Faculdade Frassinetti do Recife - FAFIRE (1941) and Belas Artes (1932), became the base courses to UFPE's formation.

On 11 August 1946, the University of Recife was created, one of the first university centers of the North and Northeast of Brazil.

In 1948, the construction of the university's campus starts. The discussion about the construction's site started a year before that. Between the cogitated places were terrains in the neighborhoods of Joana Bezerra, Santo Amaro and Ibura, the Faculty of Law's area, in Recife's centre; and a lot in Várzea, the same place where the Engenho do Meio functioned before and where the university is located nowadays. This choice was made in function of a project to the construction of an avenue in the place. Climatic conditions and the topography of the terrain were also considered.

The resources given in the acquisition and implantation of the university's campus were provenient of the state's government, that allocated 0,10% of sale taxes and consignations to the project's edification. The first buildings to be built on campus were the vivarium, a space dedicated to animal farming, that used to be located in the area which nowadays the Department of Nutrition and the Center of Health Sciences are located. The campus architectonic project's conception was made by a Venezian architect named Mário Russo.

In 1965, the University of Recife became the Federal University of Pernambuco (UFPE), authority tied to MEC.

== University's Campi ==
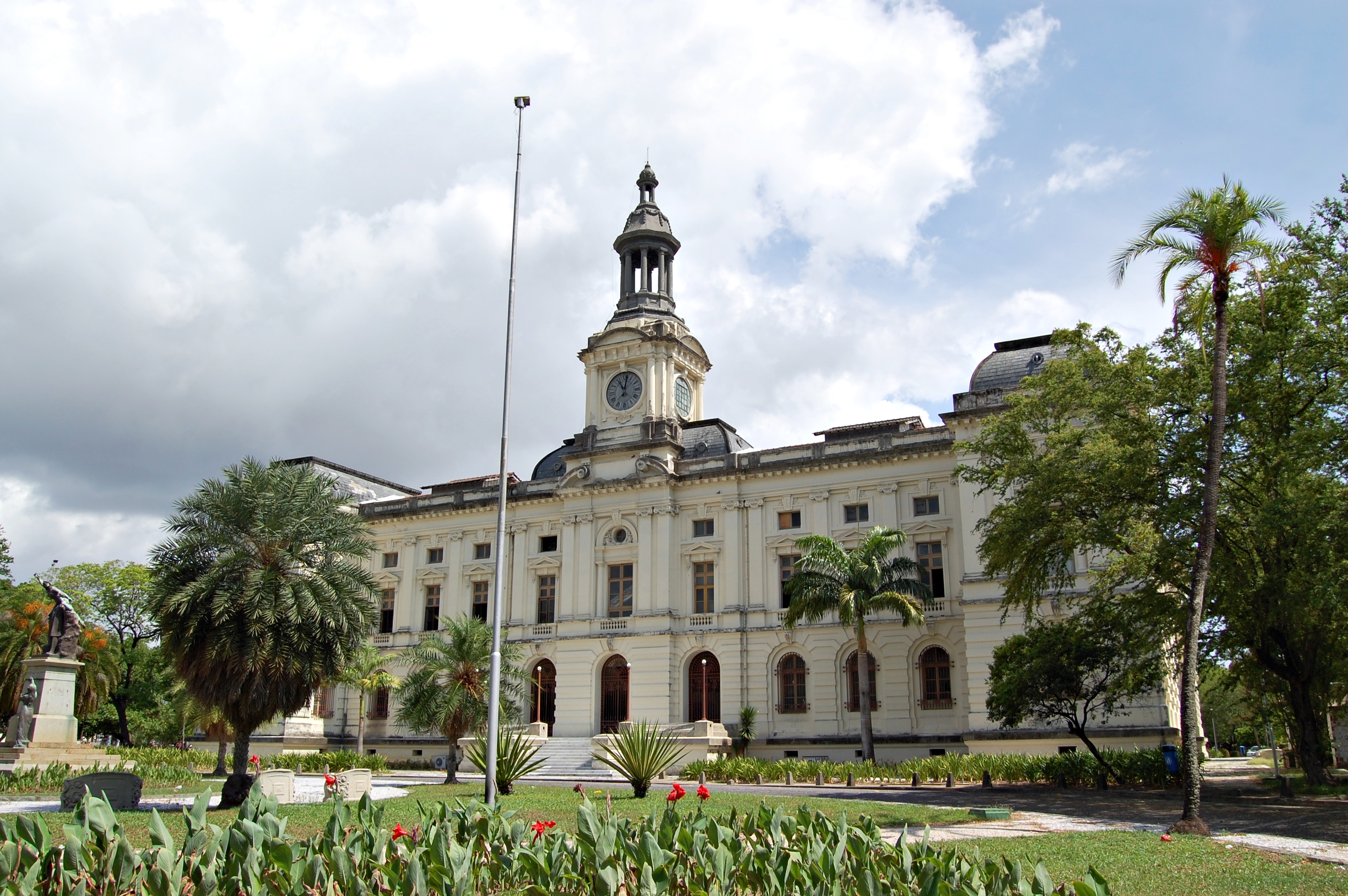
Federal University of Pernambuco's Faculty of Law

=== Campus Reitor Joaquim Amazonas (Recife) ===
UFPE has an urban campus of research in Cidade Universitária (west zone of Recife) with an area of 149 hectares, officially named Campus Universitário Reitor Joaquim Amazonas.

The central administration is located in the campus, along with nine of the ten academic centers headquartered in Recife, sixty seven departments, the Colégio de Aplicação, the Central Library, ten sectorial libraries, the Center of Information Technology, the University's Publisher, the Center of Physical Education and Sports, the Center of Hospitality and Tourism, Keizo Azami's Immunopathology Laboratory and the Hospital das Clínicas. It also holds the Centro de Convenções and Concha Acústica. Between UFPE's natural areas, the main one is the Cavouco stream.

The Center of Juridic Sciences (Faculdade de Direito do Recife), the Center of Juridic Practices, the Center of Continued Education, the Center of Radio and Television, the Pernambuco's Memorial of Medicine and Benfica's Cultural Center are all located in Recife's centre.

=== Campus of Caruaru ===
Headquartering the Academic Center of Agreste, that in its first years functioned provisionally in the Commercial Polo of Caruaru, holds classrooms, a library, an informatics lab and courses' coordinations.

In 2009, the Academic Center of Agreste had all of its activities transferred to the definitive campus.

Courses

The Academic Center of Agreste offers 11 courses.

- Business Administration and Management
- Economic Sciences
- Design
- Social Communication
- Civil Engineering
- Production Engineering
- Physics (licentiate)
- Medicine
- Chemistry (licentiate)
- Pedagogy

=== Campus of Vitória ===
The Academic Center of Vitória, headquartered in Vitória de Santo Antão, functions in installations donated by the Town Hall, an old building from 1927, that held a hospital and an agrotechnic school, divided in three blocks: an administrative block (Tabocas) and two blocks dedicated to education (Pirituba and Bela Vista).

Courses

- Biological Sciences (licentiate)
- Physical Education (licentiate and bachelor's degree)
- Nursing
- Nutrition
- Collective Health

== Undergraduate and graduate programs ==
UFPE offers more than 90 undergraduate programs and 198 post-graduate programs, with about 40,000 students and 2,000 professors.

UFPE's first post-graduate programs were created in 1967. Since then, there's been a quantitative and qualitative evolution. Of the four initial master's degrees (Mathematics, Biochemistry, Economy and Sociology), the university currently has 71, 45 doctorates and 64 specialization programs, in the areas of Human Sciences, Literature and Arts; Technology, Exact and Natural Sciences, Biological Sciences and Health Sciences.

Undergraduate	Masters	PhD
Business Administration and Management; Archeology; Architecture; Visual Arts; Biblioteconomy; Biomedicine; Actuarial Sciences; Biological Sciences (bachelor's degree); Biological Sciences - Ambiental Sciences; Biological Sciences (licentiate); Accounting; Artificial Intelligence; Computer Science; Political Science; Social Sciences (bachelor's degree); Social Sciences (licentiate); Cinema; Social Communication - Journalism; Social Communication - Publicity; Social Communication - Radio and TV; Dance (licentiate); Design; Law; Economic Sciences; Physical Education; Nursing; Biomedical Engineering; Cartographic Engineering; Civil Engineering; Computer Engineering; Food Engineering; Energy Engineering; Mines Engineering; Production Engineering; Electrical Engineering; Electronic Engineering; Automation and Control Engineering; Materials Engineering; Naval Engineering; Chemical Engineering; Mechanical Engineering; Statistics; Graphical Expression (licentiate); Pharmacy; Philosophy; Physics (bachelor's degree and licentiate); Physiotherapy; Phonoaudiology; Geography (bachelor's degree and licentiate); Geology; Information's Management; History; Hospitality; Literature; Portuguese; Spanish; French; English; Mathematics; Medicine; Museology; Music; Nutrition; Oceanography; Odontology; Pedagogy; Psychology; Industrial Chemistry; Chemistry; Collective Health; Secretariate; Social Services; Information Systems; Occupational Therapy; Theater; Tourism	Business Administration and Management; Pathological Anatomy; Anthropology; Archeology; Visual Arts; Animal Biology; Fungus Biology; Vegetal Biology; Biochemistry and Physiology; Computer Science; Materials Science; Political Science; Biological Sciences; Pharmaceutical Sciences; Geodesical Sciences and Technologies of the Geoinformation; Surgery; Communication; Urban Development; Design; Law; Economy; Education; Mathematical and Technological education; Civil Engineering; Production Engineering; Electrical Engineering; Mechanical Engineering; Mineral Engineering; Chemical Engineering; Statistics; Philosophy; Physics; Genetics; Geosciences; Geography; Management and Ambiental Policies; Public Management for Northeast's development; History; Linguistics and Literature; Mathematics; Energetic and Nuclear Technologies; Neuropsychiatry and the Science of Behavior; Nutrition; Oceanography; Odontology; Psychology; Cognitive Psychology; Chemistry; Collective Health; Children and Adolescents' Health; Adult and Elderly's Health; Sociology; Social Services	Business Administration and Management; Anthropology; Archeology; Animal Biology; Fungus Biology; Vegetal Biology; Computer Science; Materials Science; Political Science; Biological Sciences; Pharmaceutical Sciences; Surgery; Urban Development; Design; Law; Education; Economy; Civil Engineering; Production Engineering; Electrical Engineering; Mechanical Engineering; Chemical Engineering; Statistics; Philosophy; Physics; Genetics; Geosciences; Geography; History; Literature; Mathematics; Computing Mathematics; Tropical Medicine; Neuropsychiatry and the Science of Behavior; Nutrition; Oceanography; Cognitive Psychology; Chemistry; Children and Adolescents' Health; Sociology; Social Services

== Structure ==
UFPE is divided in centers, where the departments are located, counting with supplementary organs for administrative, cultural and academical support.

=== Centers ===
Centers	Departments
Academical Center of Agreste (CAA)	Center of Design; Center of Management; Center of Teachers; Center of Technology
Arts and Communication (CAC)	Architecture; Informational Sciences; Social Communications; Design; Graphical Expression; Literature; Music; Theory of Art and Artistical Expression; Cinema and Audiovisual; Visual Arts; Languages
Academical Center of Vitória (CAV)	Center of Nursing; Center of Nutrition; Center of Licentiate in Biological Sciences; Center of Physical Education and Sports; Center of Research and Extension
Biological Sciences (CCB)	Antibiotics; Human Anatomy; Biophysics and Radiobiology; Biochemistry; Botanics; Physiology and Pharmacology; Genetics; Histology and Embriology; Mycology; Zoology
Exact and Natural Sciences (CCEN)	Statistics; Physics; Mathematics; Fundamental Chemistry
Juridical Sciences (CCJ) (Faculty of Law of Recife)	General Public and Processual Law; Specialized Public Law; General Theory of Law and Private Law
Applied Social Sciences (CCSA)	Business Administration and Management; Accounting; Actuarial Sciences; Economy; Hospitality and Tourism; Secretariate; Social Services
Health Sciences (CCS)	Pharmaceutical Sciences; Surgery; Odontology; Physical Education; Nursing; Phonoaudiology; Physiotherapy; Medicine; Neuropsychiatry; Nutrition; Pathology; Occupational Therapy
Education (CE)	School Administration and Educational Planning; Social-Phylosophic Fundamentals of Education; Methods and Techniques of Teaching; Psychology and Educational Coaching
Philosophy and Human Sciences (CFCH)	Geography; Political Science; Social Sciences; Philosophy; History; Psychology
Informatics (CIn)	Artificial Intelligence; Computer Engineering; Computer Science; Information Systems
Technology and Geosciences (CTG)	Biomedical Engineering; Cartographic Engineering; Civil Engineering; Food Engineering; Energy Engineering; Mines Engineering; Production Engineering; Electrical Engineering; Electronic Engineering; Automation and Control Engineering; Materials Engineering; Naval Engineering; Chemical Engineering; Mechanical Engineering; Geology; Oceanography; Industrial Chemistry

== See also ==
- Brazil University Rankings
- List of federal universities of Brazil
- Universities and Higher Education in Brazil
