= Eduardo Campos =

Brazilian economist and politician (1965–2014)

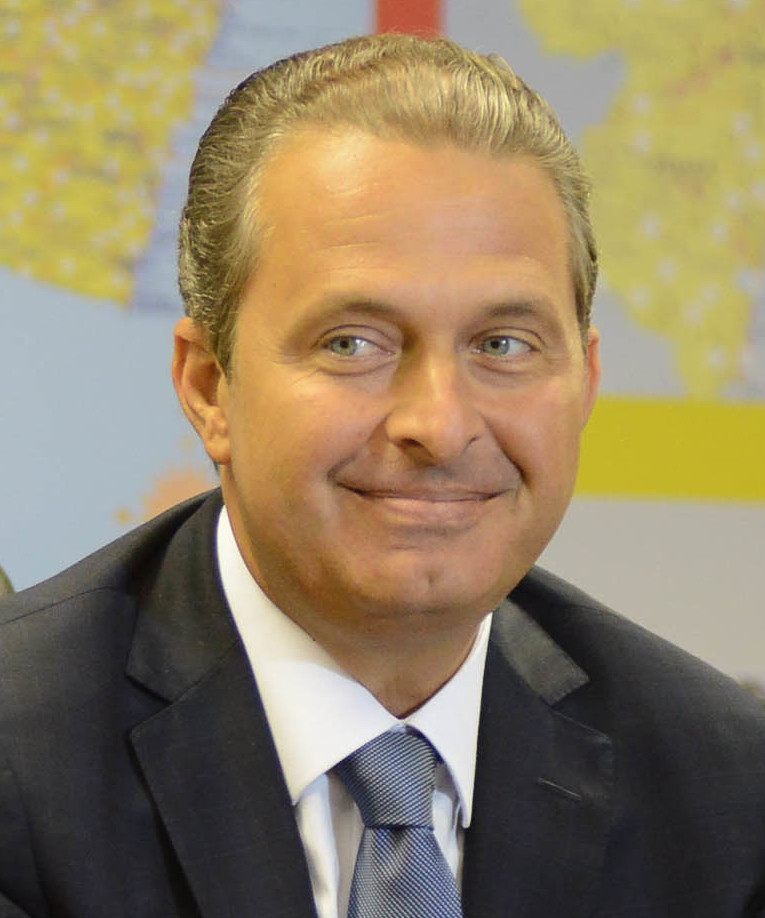
- Eduardo Campos in March 2013

Governor of Pernambuco
- In office 1 January 2007 – 4 April 2014
- Vice Governor: João Lyra Neto
- Preceded by: Mendonça Filho
- Succeeded by: João Lyra Neto

Minister of Science and Technology
- In office 23 January 2004 – 18 July 2005
- President: Luiz Inácio Lula da Silva
- Preceded by: Roberto Amaral
- Succeeded by: Sérgio Machado Rezende

Member of the Chamber of Deputies
- In office 1 February 1995 – 1 January 2007
- Constituency: Pernambuco

State Deputy of Pernambuco
- In office 1 January 1991 – 1 January 1995
- Constituency: At-large

Personal details
- Born: 10 August 1965 Recife, Pernambuco, Brazil
- Died: 13 August 2014 (aged 49) Santos, São Paulo, Brazil
- Party: Brazilian Socialist Party
- Children: 5, including João and Pedro
- Relatives: Miguel Arraes (grandfather)
- Education: Federal University of Pernambuco

Eduardo Henrique Accioly Campos (10 August 1965 – 13 August 2014) was a Brazilian congressman and governor. Born and raised in Recife, in the Northeast Brazil, he graduated in Economics from the Recife's Federal University of Pernambuco. Campos' maternal grandfather, the governor of the Brazilian state, Pernambuco, made him his Financial Secretary. Campos became a federal congressman in Brazil and got Pernambuco federal money for a shipyard, railways and an oil refinery. Later, as Brazil's Minister for Science and Technology, he supported stem-cell research. He served two terms as governor of his home state, Pernambuco. He helped hospitals, secondary schools, wind power, farms, poor people and anti-crime data-mining. In his 2014 campaign for president of Brazil he criticized the incumbent and her Workers' Party and positioned himself as the business-friendly leader of the Brazilian Socialist Party. For outdoor rallies and local radio interviews, he criss-crossed the country by rented jet. He died on 13 August 2014, three days after his 49th birthday, when his plane crashed in poor weather in the city of Santos.

== Biography ==
Eduardo Campos studied Economics at the Federal University of Pernambuco. He was married to Renata Campos and they had five children (Maria Eduarda, João Henrique, Pedro Henrique, José Henrique and Miguel). His children João Henrique and Pedro Henrique would become federal deputies for the state of Pernambuco, the former being elected mayor of Recife. Campos was the grandson of Miguel Arraes. former Governor of Pernambuco and former Federal Deputy, and son of the Minister of the Court of Accounts of the Union and former Federal Deputy Ana Arraes with Maximiano Campos. Campos was a practising Roman Catholic until his death.

== Politics ==
Campos entered politics while still in university, when he was elected as president of the Economics College Student Academic Center. In 1986, Campos turned down an opportunity to take a master's degree in the United States of America in order to participate in the campaign which elected his grandfather Miguel Arraes as governor of Pernambuco.

With Arraes' election, in 1987, Campos took up the position of Chief of Staff. In this period he was responsible for the creation of the first Science and Technology Secretariat of the Northeast – Secretaria de Ciência e Tecnologia do Nordeste – and the Science and Technology Support Foundation-Fundação de Amparo à Ciência e Tecnologia de Pernambuco (Facepe).

=== Legislative Assembly ===
Campos joined the Brazilian Socialist Party – Partido Socialista Brasileiro (PSB), in 1990. In the same year, he was elected state representative and garnered the Leão do Norte award granted by the Legislative Assembly of Pernambuco to its most active members.

=== National Congress ===
In 1994, Campos was elected Federal Representative with one hundred and thirty three thousand votes. However, he left the post to join the government of Miguel Arraes as Government Secretary and Treasury Secretary, between 1995 and 1998. In this last year, he ran for a new tenure of Federal Representative and reached the record number of 173.657 thousand votes, the biggest polling in the state.

In 2002, being for the third time a member of the Federal Congress, Campos was the articulator of Lula's government in the Social Welfare and Fiscal Reforms. For three consecutive years, he was on the list of the Inter-Union Department of the Parliamentary Advisory Board – Departamento Intersindical de Assessoria Parlamentar (DIAP), amongst the 100 members who had been most influential in the National Congress.

=== Science and Technology Ministry ===
Campos took office in 2004 as Science and Technology Minister – the youngest member among those appointed for the first tenure of President Lula. During his administration, the Ministry re-elaborated the strategic planning and reviewed the Brazilian Space and Nuclear Energy Programs.

The action that had the strongest repercussion, during his stay in the ministry, was the approval of the Biosafety Program, which allows the use of embryonic stem cells and trans-genetics for research aims. He also achieved unanimously in Congress, the approval of the Technological Innovation Law, resulting in the regulatory framework for enterprises, universities and research institutions. Another important action during Campos' tenure in this office was the creation of the Brazilian Public Schools Mathematics Olympics – considered to be the biggest Mathematics Olympics in the world in number of participants.

=== Leader of the Brazilian Socialist Party ===
In 2005 Campos became the National President of the Brazilian Socialist Party – Partido Socialista Brasileiro. However, at the beginning of 2006, he left this post in order to run for the government of the state of Pernambuco, by the Popular Front. In 2011, he was re-elected president of the party, with tenure until 2014.

== Government of Pernambuco ==
Campos ran for the government of the state of Pernambuco in 2006. As the moderate left-wing nominee, who had started the disputed election in third place in the polls, he was elected with more than 60% of the valid votes for governor in the second round. With his government well evaluated and high popularity, Eduardo Campos ran for re-election in 2010. As in 2007, he had the support of Luiz Inácio Lula da Silva, president at that time. Campos was re-elected, being then, the most well voted governor in Brazil: more than 80% of the valid votes in the first round, defeating Senator Jarbas Vasconcelos.

=== Eduardo Campos Administration ===
Campos was the Governor of the state of Pernambuco for seven years (2007–2014). During this period his administration was recognized by various entities and he received many international awards. In 2012, the government of Pernambuco won two of the five categories of the United Nations Public Service Awards (UNPSA), one on Fostering participation in Policy Making decisions through innovative mechanisms, with the workshops "All for Pernambuco", and another in the category Promoting Gender Responsive Delivery of Public Services, with the Women's Straw Hat Project – Chapéu de Palha Mulher. The prizes were given in New York (USA), in a ceremony at the UN Headquarters, coordinated by the UN General Assembly President Nassir Abdulaziz Al-Nasser.

In public safety there has been a reduction in the rates of violence with the implementation of the program Pact for Life – Pacto pela Vida – The number of homicides in the state has dropped 39.10% since the beginning of the program. This reduction has also occurred in relation to crimes of theft and robbery. Between 2007 and 2013 there has been a decline of 30.3% in these crimes in the state. The positive rates of the "Pact for Life Program" have also been recognized internationally. In 2013, the project received, in Washington DC, capital of the United States of America, the Safe Government award for good practices in crime and violence prevention. In the same ceremony, at the Inter-American Development Bank (IDB) headquarters, Campos received the Governance Award – The Art of Good Governance.

During his administration, the state of Pernambuco grew economically above the Brazilian average (3.5% in 2009) and investments were over R$2,4 B in 2009 – against the historical average of R$600M/year.

In Health, three new hospitals in the Metropolitan Region of Recife (MRR) were built, and also 14 Emergency Care Units (ECUs)–Unidades de Pronto Atendimento (UPAs), besides the expansion of the number of Intensive Care unit beds. Between 2006 and 2013, Pernambuco has been established as the northeastern state with the highest gain in life expectancy (3.72 years), exceeding the regional average. There has also been a reduction of 9.6% in the avoidable causes mortality rates. In 2011, Pernambuco reached the national average regarding child mortality, reducing in 47.5% its coefficient.

In Education, between 2007 and 2011, there was a registered growth of 14.8% in the Basic Education Development Index (BEDI) – Índice de Desenvolvimento da EducaçãoBásica (Ideb). This number more than doubles the national average of 6.2%. The students from the Technical Schools of Pernambuco have an average performance 47% superior compared to the students from other states in Brazil, like São Paulo and Santa Catarina, according to the National Institute of Educational Studies and Research (NIES) – Instituto Nacional de Estudos e Pesquisas Educacionais (Inep).

=== Programmatic Alliance PSB – Sustainability Network ===
In October 2013, Eduardo Campos announced the Programmatic Alliance with the Sustainability Network of the former Senator and Environment minister from Lula's government, Marina Silva, whose new party's registration claim had been denied by the Electoral Supreme Court (ESC) – Tribunal Superior Eleitoral (TSE). In April 2014, Eduardo Campos announced his name for the Brazilian Presidential election, naming Marina Silva as his running mate for vice president.

== Death ==
At the start of the formal campaigning/debate season of the 2014 Brazilian presidential election on Wednesday 13 August 2014, Campos was due to attend campaign events in Santos, São Paulo state with members of his campaign team. Arriving at Santos Air Force Base at Guarujá, the plane, a Cessna Citation, crashed in a residential area of Santos at 09:50 BRT during bad weather, killing all seven occupants.

Following his death, periods of official mourning were decreed by the Brazilian president, Dilma Rousseff, and in Recife, Pernambuco.

Campos was buried in the Santo Amaro cemetery in Recife on 17 August. The ceremonies were attended by President Rousseff and other political leaders; over 100,000 people attended the funeral procession. The following day, Marina Silva took over as the presidential candidate.

Political offices
Preceded by Roberto Amaral	Minister of Science and Technology; 2004–2005	Succeeded by Sérgio Machado Rezende
Preceded by Mendonça Filho	Governor of Pernambuco; 2007–2014	Succeeded by João Lyra Neto
