= Tribunal de Contas da União =

Brazilian accountability office

Coordinates: 15°48′14″S 47°51′48″W

Federal Court of Accounts
- Tribunal de Contas da União
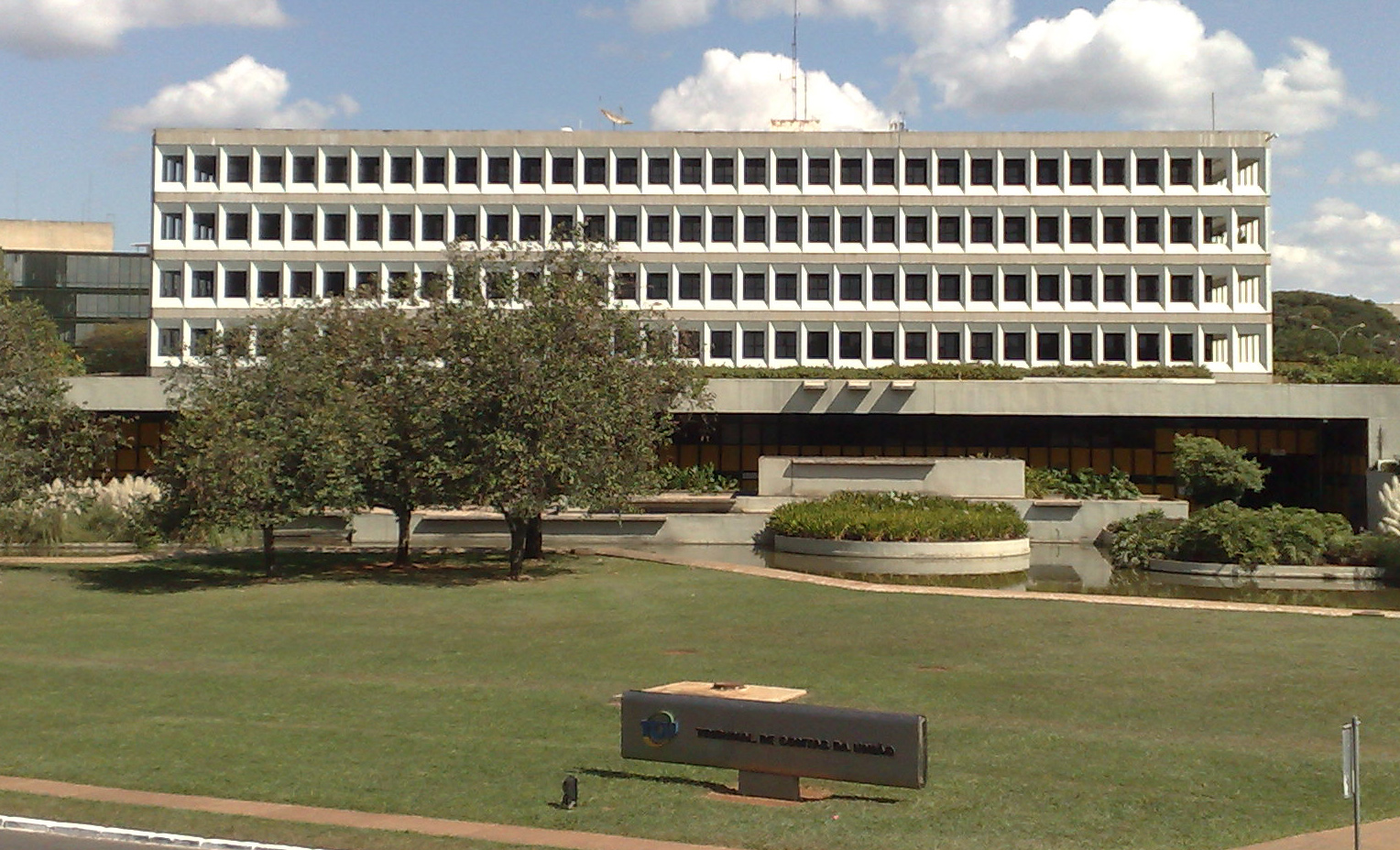

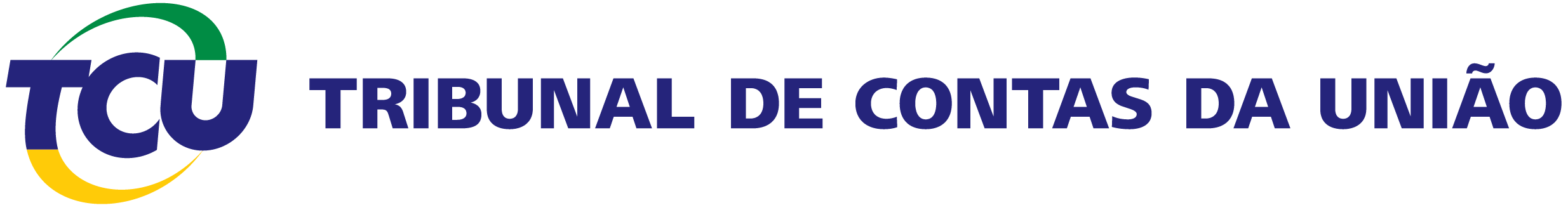
- Interactive map of Federal Court of Accounts
- Established: 7 November 1890; 135 years ago
- Jurisdiction: Brazil
- Composition method: Presidential nomination with confirmation from the Senate
- Authorised by: Constitution of Brazil
- Appeals from: Court of Audit
- Judge term length: Life tenure (mandatory retirement at age 75)
- Number of positions: 9
- Language: Portuguese
- Website: www.tcu.gov.br

President
- Currently: Vital do Rêgo Filho

Vice President
- Currently: Jorge Oliveira

The Brazilian Federal Court of Accounts (Portuguese: Tribunal de Contas da União, often referred to as TCU) is Brazil's federal audit office. It provides assistance to the Congress of Brazil in its Constitutional duty to exercise external audit over the Executive Branch. Its members, known as Ministers, are appointed by the National Congress and the President of Brazil. The TCU employs a highly qualified body of civil servants to prevent, investigate and sanction corruption and malpractice of public funds, with national jurisdiction.

The Court was established on November 7, 1890, although its origins can be traced back to the Royal Treasury (Erário Régio), founded in 1808 by King John VI. It is, therefore, one of the world's oldest institutions dedicated to national government accountability. Today, the TCU works in cooperation with the Comptroller-General of the Union (CGU), which oversees federal executive internal audit. The Court's work is further scrutinized by the Public Ministry.

In 2022 the TCU hosted the XXIV INCOSAI, a congress of INTOSAI, International Organization of Supreme Audit Institutions.

The TCU's efforts in 2011 resulted in saving 14 billion reais (US$7.44 billion) for Brazilian taxpayer. For every real spent by the court to prevent corruption and wasteful spending, 10.5 reais were saved.

== Current members ==
Former president Incumbent president Incumbent vice president
Order of seniority	Justice	Initial date (inauguration)	Limite date (retirement)	Nominated by	Appointed by
1	Walton Alencar Rodrigues (born 1962)	13 April 1999	19 April 2037	Fernando Henrique Cardoso	Public Prosecutor's Office at the Federal Court of Accounts
2	Benjamin Zymler (born 1956)	11 September 2001	25 March 2031	Fernando Henrique Cardoso	Auditors of the Federal Court of Accounts
3	Augusto Nardes (born 1952)	20 September 2005	13 October 2027	Luiz Inácio Lula da Silva	Chamber of Deputies
4	Vital do Rêgo Filho (born 1963)	22 December 2014	21 September 2038	Dilma Rousseff	Federal Senate
5	Jorge Oliveira (born 1954)	31 December 2020	15 November 2049	Jair Bolsonaro	Presidency of the Republic
6	Antonio Anastasia (born 1961)	03 February 2022	9 May 2036	Jair Bolsonaro	Federal Senate
7	Jhonatan de Jesus (born 1983)	15 March 2023	3 September 2058	Luiz Inácio Lula da Silva	Chamber of Deputies
8	Odair Cunha (born 1976)	20 May 2026	18 June 2046	Luiz Inácio Lula da Silva	Chamber of Deputies
9	Rodrigo Pacheco (born 1976)	30 September 2026	3 November 2051	Luiz Inácio Lula da Silva	Federal Senate
