= 1963 in Brazil =

Events in the year 1963 in Brazil.

== Incumbents ==
=== Federal government ===
- President: João Goulart
- Prime Minister: Hermes Lima (until 23 January)
- Vice President: vacant

=== Governors ===
- Acre: Vacant
- Alagoas: Luis Cavalcante
- Amazonas:
  - Gilberto Mestrinho (until 25 March)
  - Plínio Ramos Coelho (from 25 March)
- Bahia:
  - Juracy Magalhães (until 7 April)
  - Lomanto Junior (from 7 April)
- Ceará:
  - Parsifal Barroso (until 25 March)
  - Virgílio Távora (from 25 March)
- Espírito Santo:
  - Asdrúbal Martins Soares (until 31 January)
  - Francisco Lacerda de Aguiar (from 31 January)
- Goiás: Mauro Borges
- Guanabara: Carlos Lacerda
- Maranhão: Newton de Barros Belo
- Mato Grosso: Fernando Corrêa da Costa
- Minas Gerais: José de Magalhães Pinto
- Pará: Aurélio do Carmo
- Paraíba: Pedro Gondim
- Paraná: Nei Braga
- Pernambuco:
  - Cid Sampaio (until 31 January)
  - Miguel Arraes (from 31 January)
- Piauí:
  - Tibério Nunes (until 25 March)
  - Petrônio Portella (from 25 March)
- Rio de Janeiro:
  - José Janotti (until 18 January)
  - Luís Miguel Pinaud (18 January-31 January)
  - Badger da Silveira (from 31 January)
- Rio Grande do Norte: Aluízio Alves
- Rio Grande do Sul:
  - Leonel Brizola (until 25 March)
  - Ildo Meneghetti (from 25 March)
- Santa Catarina: Celso Ramos
- São Paulo:
  - Carlos Alberto Alves de Carvalho Pinto (until 31 January)
  - Ademar de Barros (from 31 January)
- Sergipe:
  - Dionísio Machado (until 30 January)
  - Horácio Dantas de Goes (30 January-31 January)
  - João de Seixas Dória (from 31 January)

=== Vice governors ===
- Alagoas: Teotônio Brandão Vilela
- Bahia: Orlando Moscoso
- Ceará:
  - Wilson Gonçalves (until 31 January)
  - Joaquim de Figueiredo Correia (from 25 March)
- Espírito Santo: Rubens Rangel (from 31 January)
- Goiás:
  - Antônio Rezende Monteiro (until 31 January)
  - Vacant thereafter (from 31 January)
- Maranhão: Alfredo Salim Duailibe
- Mato Grosso: Jose Garcia Neto
- Minas Gerais: Clóvis Salgado da Gama
- Pará: Newton Burlamaqui de Miranda
- Paraíba: André Avelino de Paiva Gadelha
- Pernambuco: Paulo Pessoa Guerra
- Piauí: João Clímaco d'Almeida
- Rio de Janeiro: João Batista da Costa (from 31 January)
- Rio Grande do Norte: Teodorico Bezerra (from 19 January)
- Santa Catarina: Armindo Marcílio Doutel de Andrade
- São Paulo:
  - Porfírio da Paz (until 31 January)
  - Laudo Natel (from 31 January)
- Sergipe: Celso Carvalho (from 31 January)

== Events ==
=== January ===
- January 6: A plebiscite chooses the presidential system over a parliamentary one. As a result, the office of the Prime Minister is abolished.
- January 8: The flag of Minas Gerais is instituted.

=== March ===
- March 12: The first Korean immigrants arrive in Brazil.

=== April ===
- April 20-May 5: The 1963 Pan American Games are held in São Paulo.

=== May ===
- May 23: The Brazilian national team wins its second World Men's Basketball Championship by beating the Soviet Union by 90 to 79 points, in Rio de Janeiro.

=== July ===
- July 20: Ieda Maria Vargas becomes the first Brazilian to win the Miss Universe title, which is held in Miami Beach, Florida, United States of America.

=== October ===
- October 7: The Ipatinga massacre takes place, after military police shot at Usiminas employees.

=== November ===
- November 16: Santos FC becomes the first Brazilian club to win a second Intercontinental Cup (football).

=== December ===
- December 4: Senator Arnon de Melo, who was trying to shoot Senator Silvestre Péricles, shot and killed alternate Senator José Kairala.

== Births ==
=== January ===
- January 5 – Luís Carlos Winck, footballer and coach
- January 12 – Nando Reis, musician and producer

=== March ===
- March 11 – Marcos Pontes, astronaut and politician

=== July ===
- July 7 – Leonardo Brício, actor and theatre director

=== October ===
- October 31 – Dunga, footballer and coach

=== November ===
- November 2 – Valdemiro Santiago, evangelical pastor

== Deaths ==
- November 4 – Carlos Magalhães de Azeredo, poet and writer (b. 1872)

== See also ==
- 1963 in Brazilian football
- 1963 in Brazilian television
