= National Congress Palace =

Meeting place of the National Congress of Brazil

- Palácio do Congresso Nacional
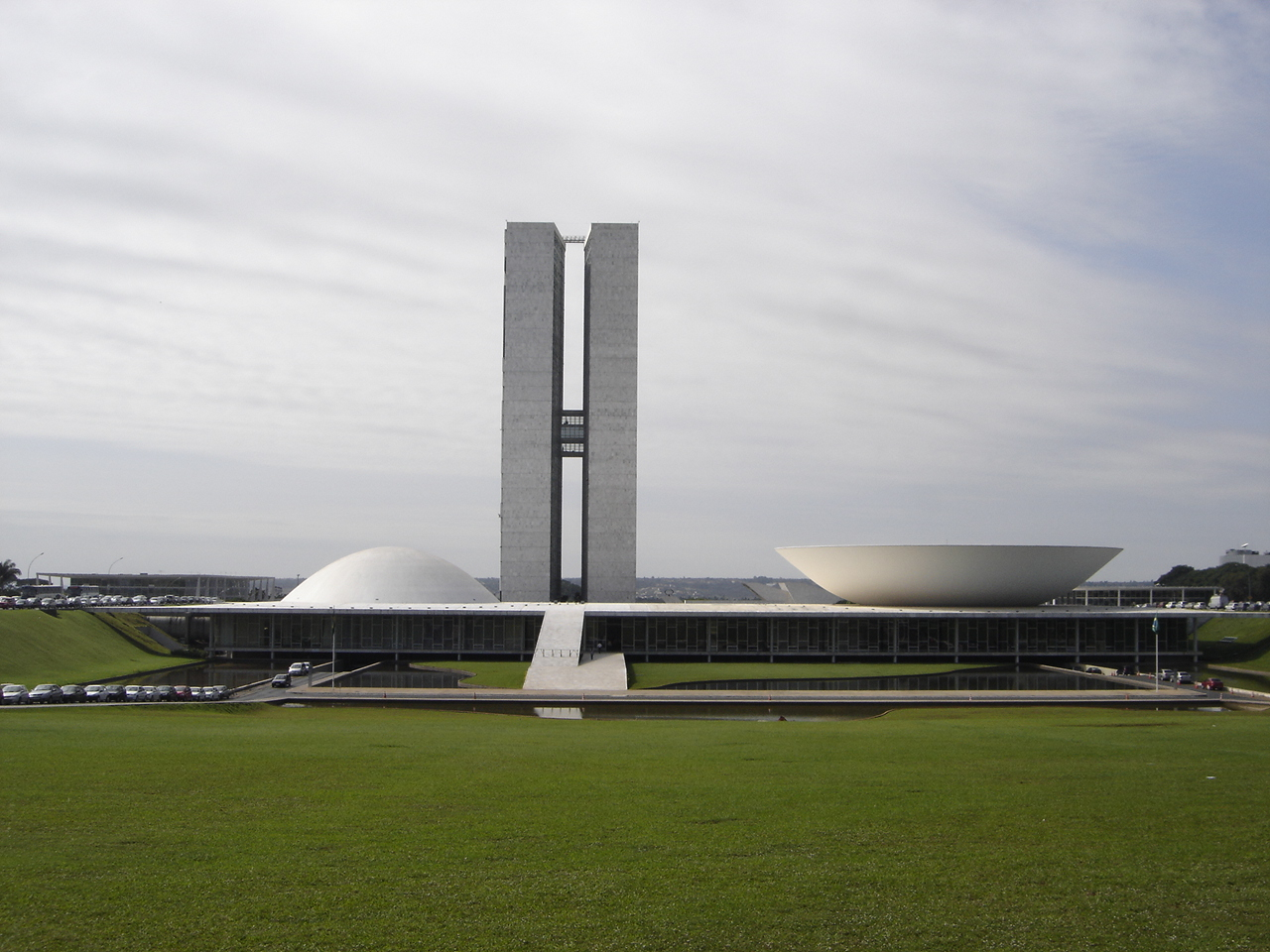
- View of the building
- Interactive map of the National Congress Palace area
- Alternative names: Nereu Ramos Palace (Portuguese: Palácio Nereu Ramos)

General information
- Architectural style: Brazilian modernism
- Location: Praça dos Três Poderes, Brasília, Federal District, Brazil
- Coordinates: 15°47′59″S 47°51′51″W
- Current tenants: National Congress of Brazil
- Year built: 1958–1960
- Inaugurated: 21 April 1960
- Client: Juscelino Kubitschek administration

Height
- Height: 100 m (330 ft)

Technical details
- Floor count: 3 (main building); 28 (Annex I)

Design and construction
- Architect: Oscar Niemeyer
- Engineer: Joaquim Cardozo

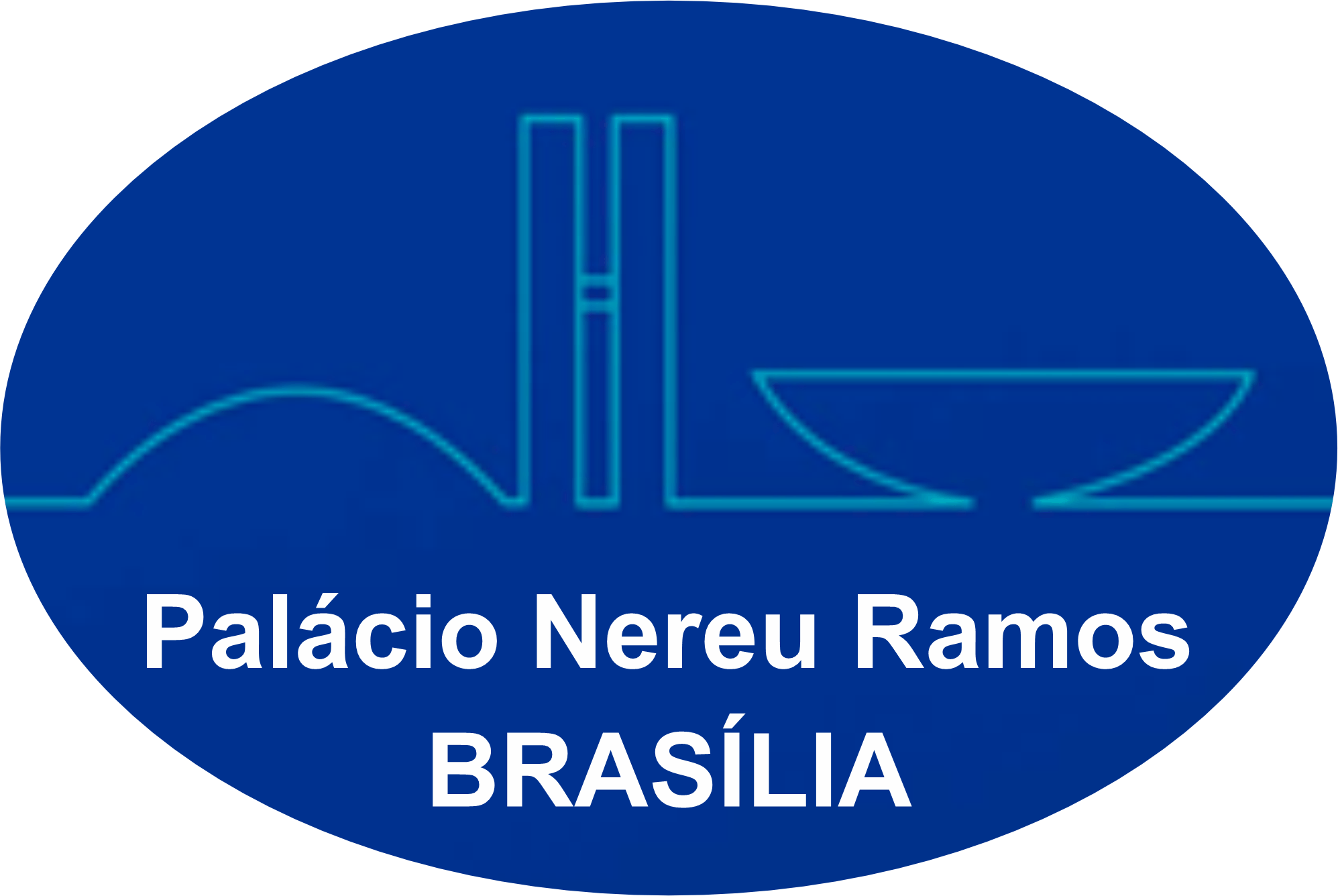
National Congress Palace logo.

The National Congress Palace (Portuguese: Palácio do Congresso Nacional) is a building in Brasilia, Brazil that serves as the meeting place of the Brazilian national legislature, the National Congress of Brazil. It was built in 1960.

== History ==
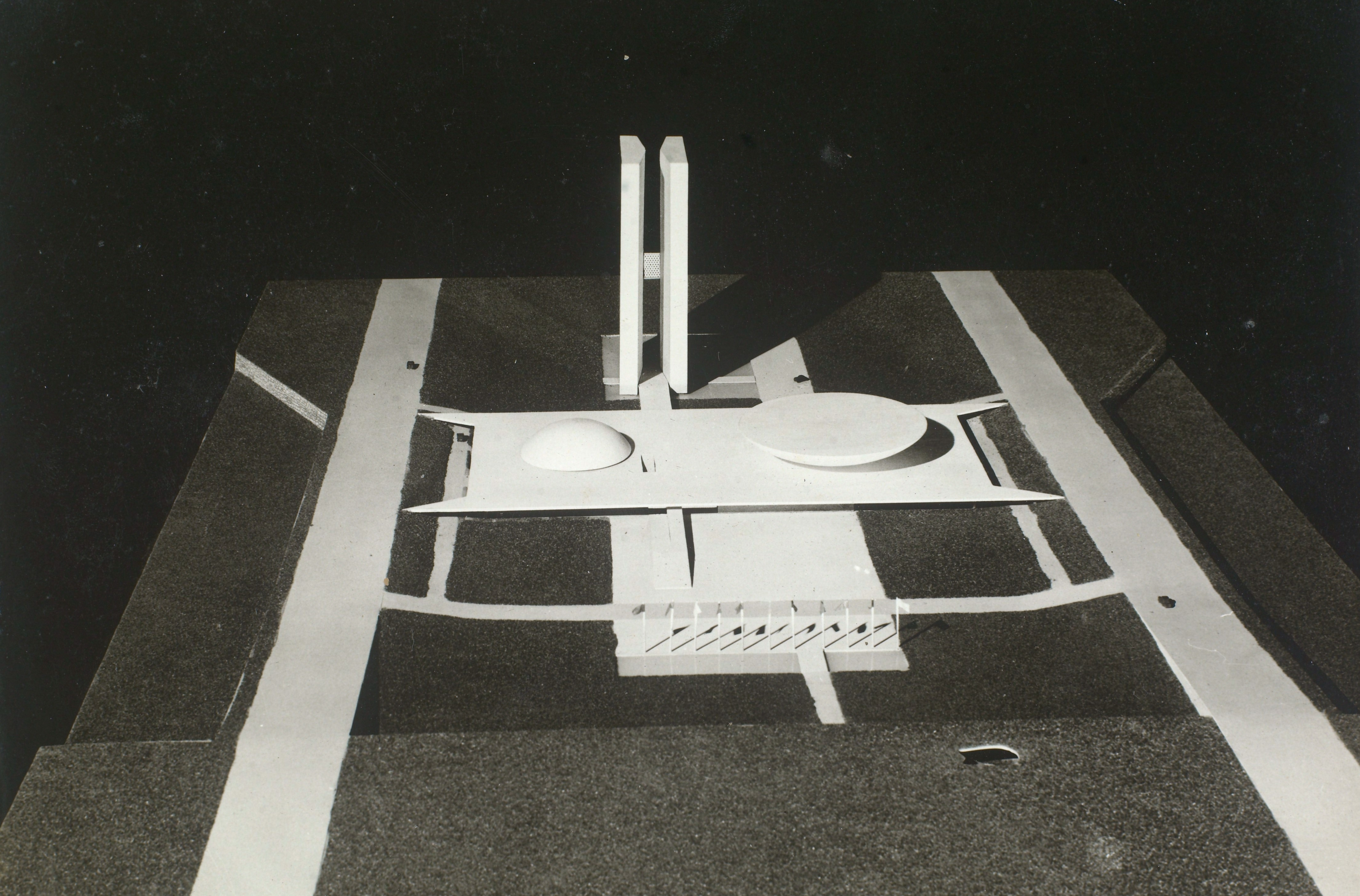
Model of the National Congress. It is visible that the towers are not completely rectangular.

In the early 1900s, the Brazilian National Congress happened to be in separate buildings in Rio de Janeiro which was then the national capital. The Senate was located near Railway Central Station, beside the Republica Square, at Moncorvo Filho Street, where there is today a Federal University of Rio de Janeiro students' center. The Federal Chamber of Deputies was located at Tiradentes Palace, which would later be the location of the Legislative Assembly of Rio de Janeiro. From the 1930s to early 1960s, the Senate occupied the Monroe Palace, which was demolished in the 1970s to allow the construction of the subway Cinelândia Station. The Federal Chamber of Deputies moved to Brasília in the early 1960s, a process that took years to complete.

When the Pilot Plan Competition for Brasília was concluded, the project site was defined, and the winning design, by Lúcio Costa, established a very prominent location for the building. In item 9 of the justification report, Costa defined the Praça dos Três Poderes as a triangle in which each of the three branches of government would occupy one corner, with the legislative palace located at the vertex. It was also established in Lúcio Costa's Pilot Plan that the square would be higher than the Esplanade of Ministries and that the National Congress would have a façade facing each direction, oriented both toward the Esplanade and toward the Praça dos Três Poderes.

Since the 1960s, the National Congress has been located in Brasília. As with most of the city's government buildings, the National Congress building was designed by Oscar Niemeyer in the Modernist style.

The building is located in the middle of the Monumental Axis, the main street of Brasília. In front of it there is a large lawn where demonstrations take place. At the back of it, is the Praça dos Três Poderes ('Three Powers Plaza'), where lies the Palácio do Planalto and the Supreme Federal Court.

On 6 December 2007, the National Institute of Historic and Artistic Heritage (Instituto do Patrimônio Histórico e Artístico Nacional) designated the building of the National Congress as a historical heritage of the Brazilian people. The building has also been a UNESCO World Heritage Site, as part of Brasília's original urban buildings, since 1987.

== Design and construction ==
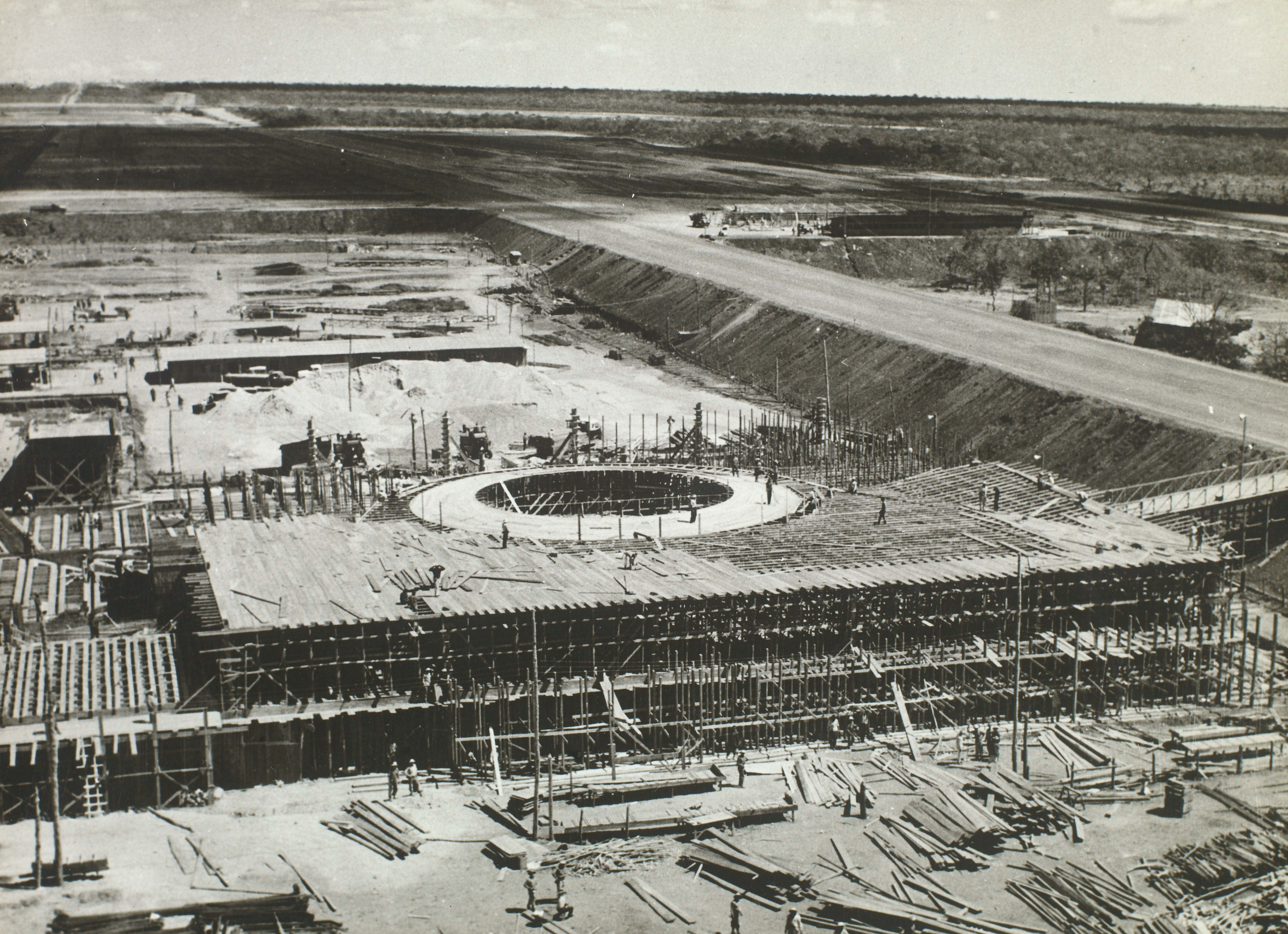
The two domes have an opening connecting them to their respective plenary halls. The opening is visible in this photograph of the building under construction.

The first preliminary designs for the building were produced by the architect in 1957, shortly after the plan for the city had been defined—some structures, such as the Palácio da Alvorada, were already under construction at the time. The main building would house the chambers and the support offices for the plenary halls. Two twenty-eight-storey towers, called annexes, were intended for administrative services and offices. The first preliminary design included some changes, such as a mezzanine for the public in the plenary halls, and also included an auditorium, which was eventually discarded in later stages. What remained in the executed building was an inclined garden on the west façade, where the auditorium would have been located. Formally, the building would stand out not only because of its privileged position in relation to the other two palaces of the Praça dos Três Poderes, but also because it did not share formal elements with either the Planalto Palace or the Supreme Federal Court building, which for example has similar pillars.

In Brasília, Niemeyer moved somewhat away from the earlier phase of his career. Although he followed modernist principles, he—like many colleagues of the Carioca School—had been less rigid than the International Style, adding elements that referred to colonial architecture, such as greater diversity of materials and more curves. Curves remained present but were used more sparingly: he sought compact, simple and more geometric solutions, focusing more on issues of hierarchy and architectural character and believing that the expression of buildings would come from their own structure. To achieve this, he relied on trusted structural engineers. Joaquim Cardozo worked with the architect on the main buildings of the capital, including the National Congress, even from a distance—due to his age, the engineer preferred to remain in Rio de Janeiro.

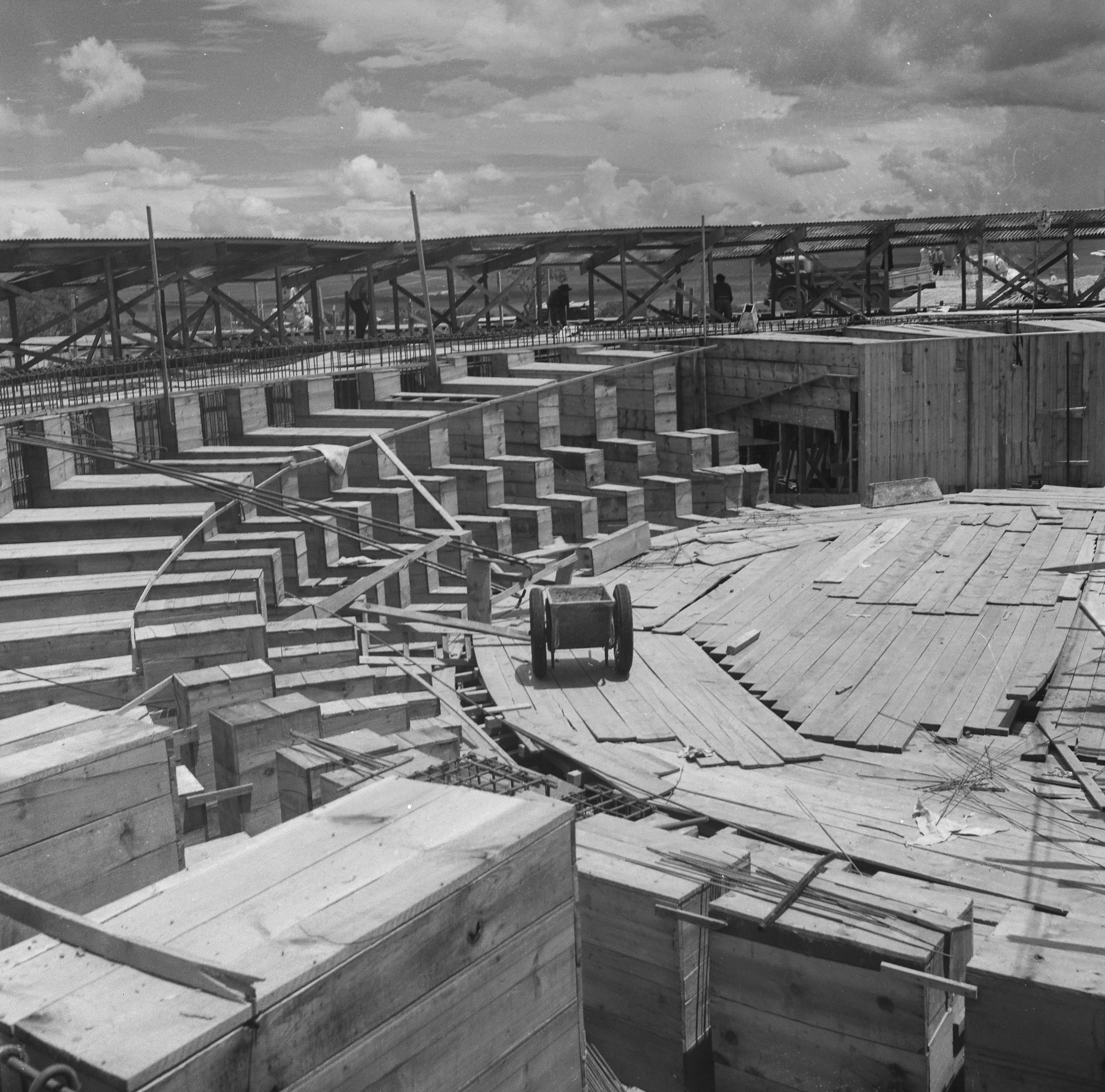
Dome under construction, 1959. National Archives of Brazil.

At the time Brasília was being built, architect Oscar Niemeyer and structural engineer Joaquim Cardozo sought to create the curved forms that today define the landscape of Brazil’s capital. Niemeyer produced sketches of the design and sent the curved forms to the engineer, whose task was to perform the mathematical calculations needed for the concrete structure to support the smooth shapes. The goal was to create two distinct domes, with an additional challenge for the dome of the Chamber of Deputies, which had to appear as if it were simply resting on the slab. Many hours of calculations and reflection were required before Joaquim Cardozo found the equations that would produce the appropriate tangencies, allowing the gentle curved lines conceived by the architect to be realized in construction.

I found the tangent that will allow the dome to appear as if it were merely resting on the slab.

— Joaquim Cardozo, to Oscar Niemeyer

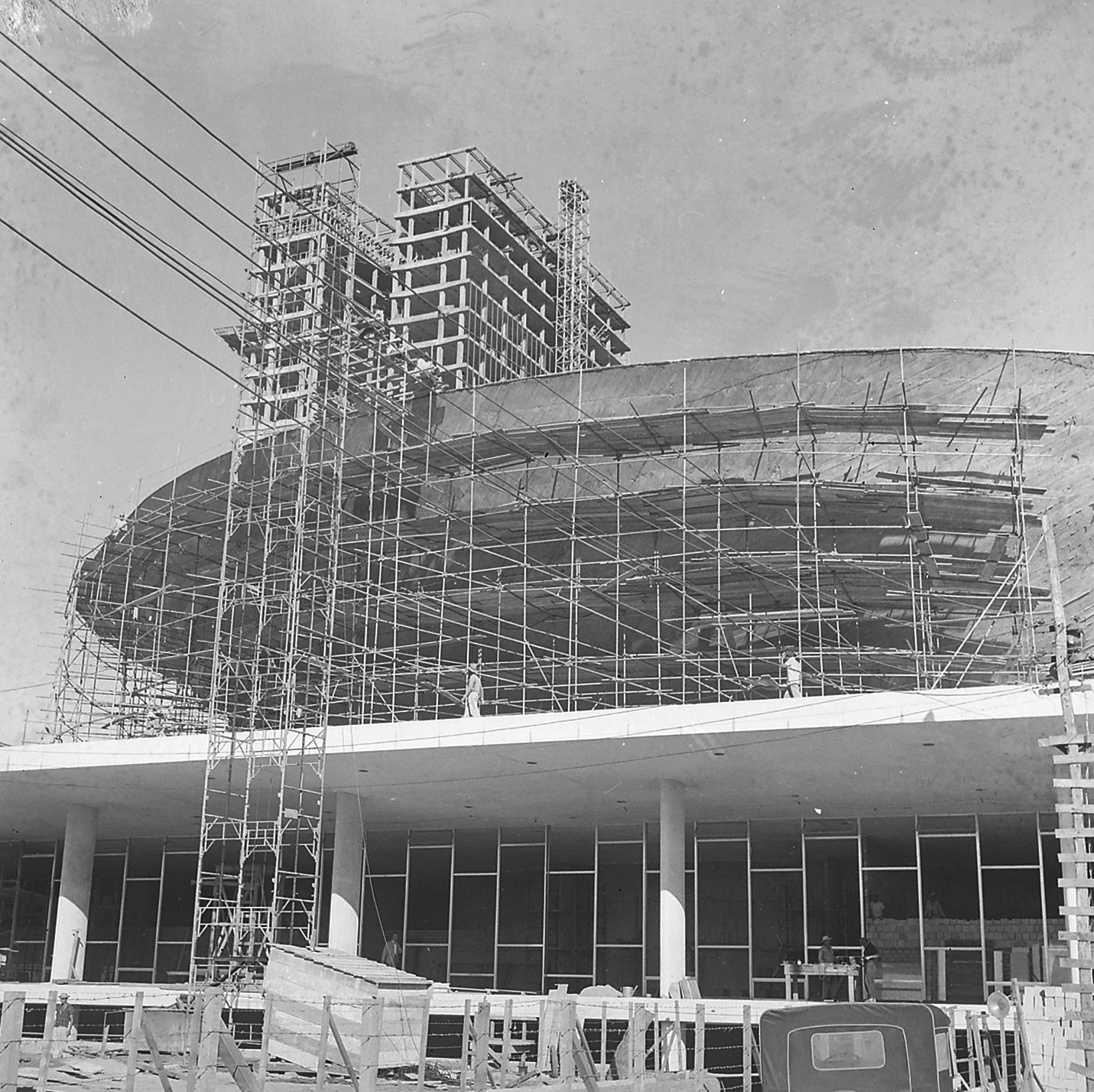
Construction of the Chamber of Deputies of Brazil, 1959. National Archives of Brazil.

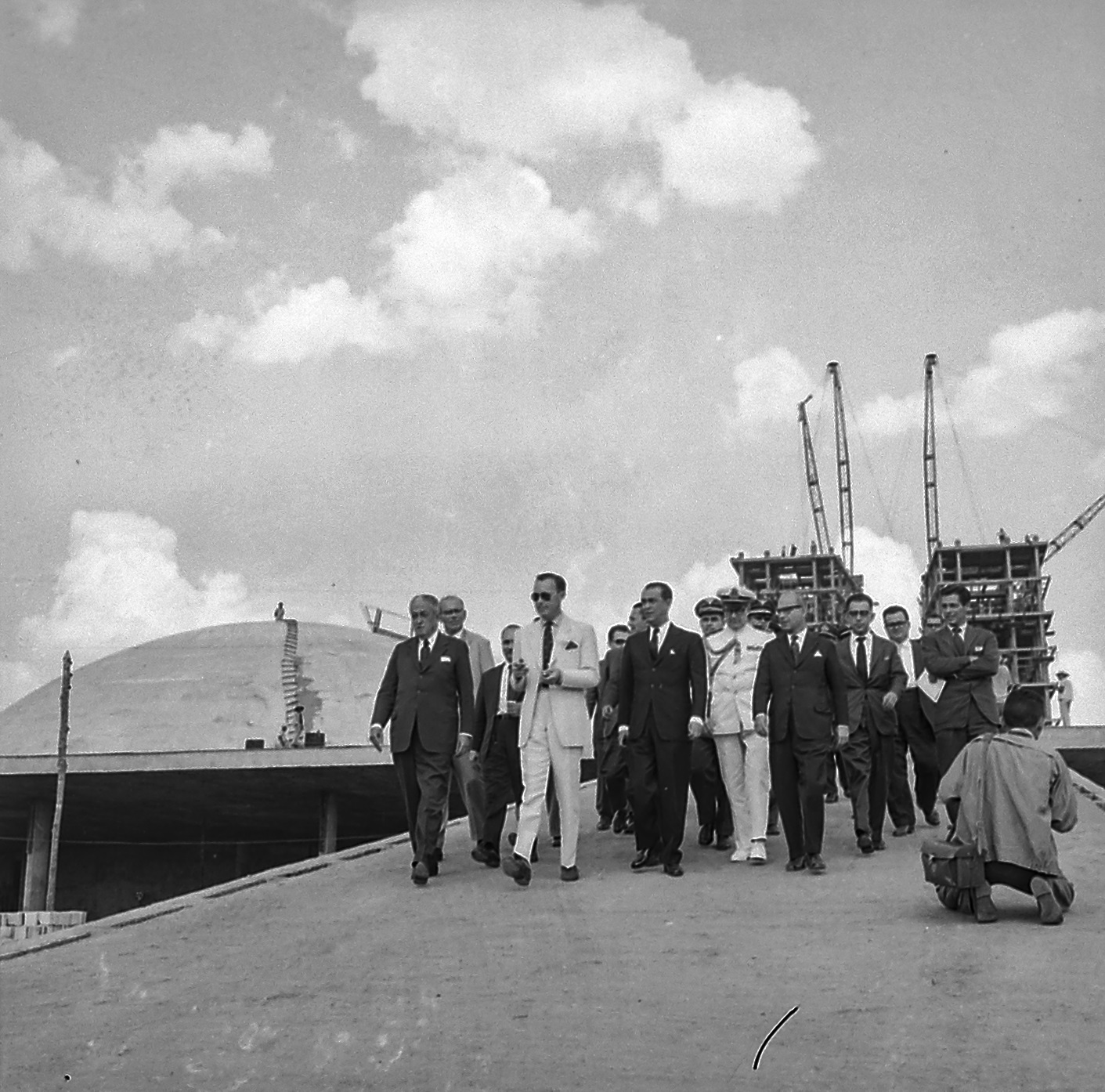
President Juscelino Kubitschek visiting the construction works of the National Congress.

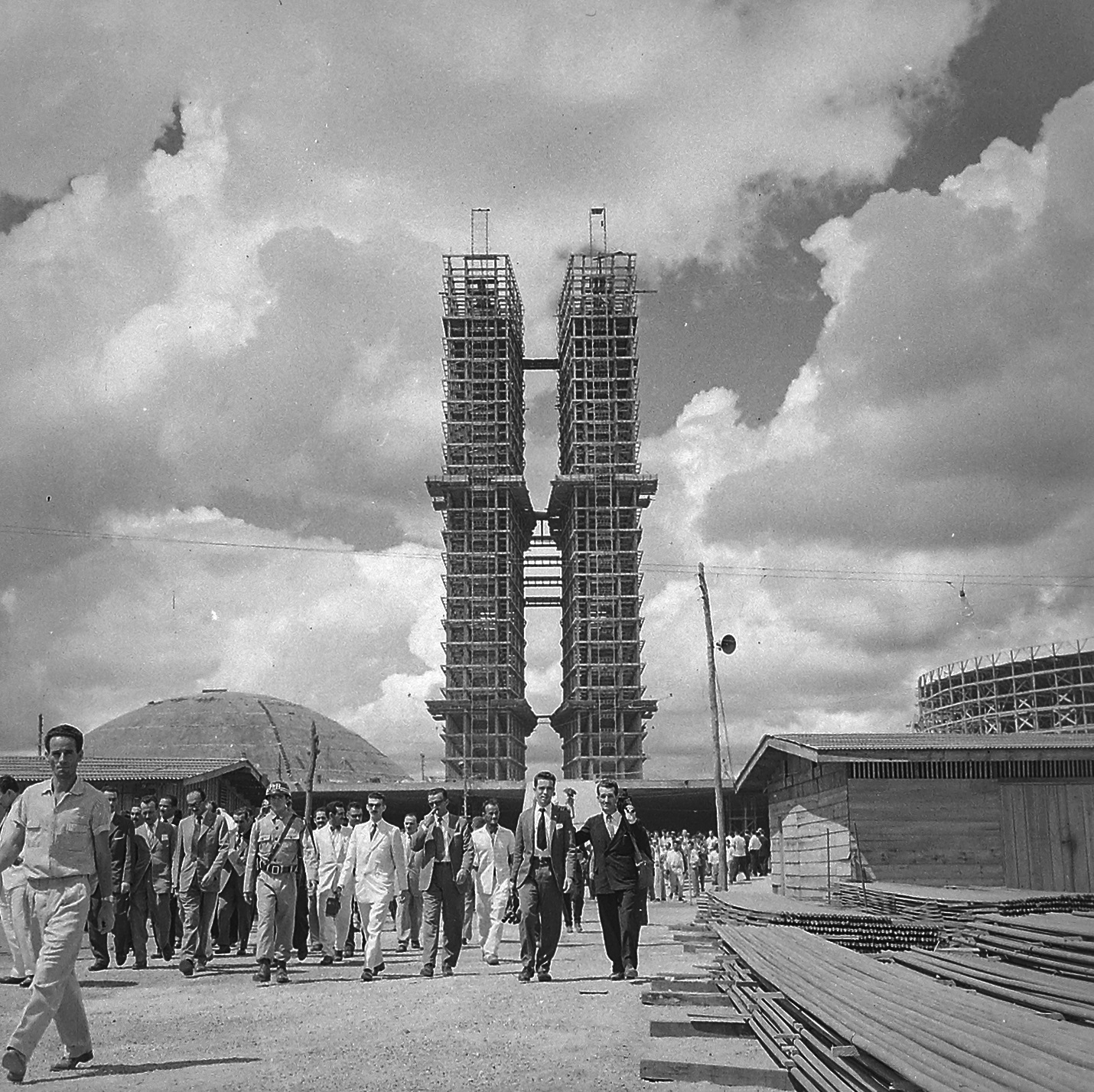
Congress under construction.

Joaquim Cardozo and Oscar Niemeyer worked in a state of "creative vigilance". This mental state occurs when individuals immerse themselves in the search to give form to what they want to create. Both sought what they considered beauty translated into curved forms, represented both in the images drawn in the architect's sketches and in the engineer's calculations. This collaborative work between artist and calculator is an example of creative processes arising from the partnership between art and mathematics.

Architecture is not merely a question of engineering, but a manifestation of spirit, imagination and poetry.

In the Congress Palace, for example, the composition was formulated according to this criterion, taking into account the requirements of architecture and urban planning, the volumes, the open spaces, visual opportunities and perspectives and, above all, the intention of giving it a monumental character, with the simplification of its elements and the adoption of pure and geometric forms. From this came the entire design of the Palace and the use of the local topography in order to create at the level of the avenues that flank it a monumental esplanade and above it place the domes that would hierarchically characterize it.

Had the Palace been studied with an academic spirit, or with concern about criticism, instead of this esplanade—which surprises many because of its grandeur—we would have had a vertical construction.

… which today extends in depth beyond the building, above the esplanade, between the domes, encompassing the Praça dos Três Poderes and the other architectural elements that compose it, combining plastically and making the perspective of the ensemble much richer and more varied.

The dome of the Chamber of Deputies required careful study so that it would appear merely resting on the esplanade—that is, the roof of the building; the same occurred with the latter, whose top is so thin that no one imagines it constitutes internally the public gallery connecting the two plenary halls.

Internally, the design seeks to create the large open spaces that should characterize a palace, using transparent elements that prevent them from becoming small areas.

Architectural form—even when it contradicts structural principles—is functional when it creates beauty and becomes different and innovative.

— Oscar Niemeyer

Another trusted collaborator of Oscar Niemeyer was architect Nauro Esteves, who coordinated the technical activities of the projects and even designed some himself, such as those for the Praça da Municipalidade. He was responsible for authorizing and carrying out modifications to the original design, such as the roof slab of the base of the plenary halls, which was modified due to structural considerations. Joaquim Cardozo also proposed modifications, including the routing of rainwater pipes through the pillars. Nauro authorized these changes and directed the team responsible for building installations in Brasília (such as electrical and hydraulic systems), while Joaquim calculated the structural elements in Rio de Janeiro.

The Congress was inaugurated in Brasília on 21 April 1960, on the same day the city itself was inaugurated.

== The building ==
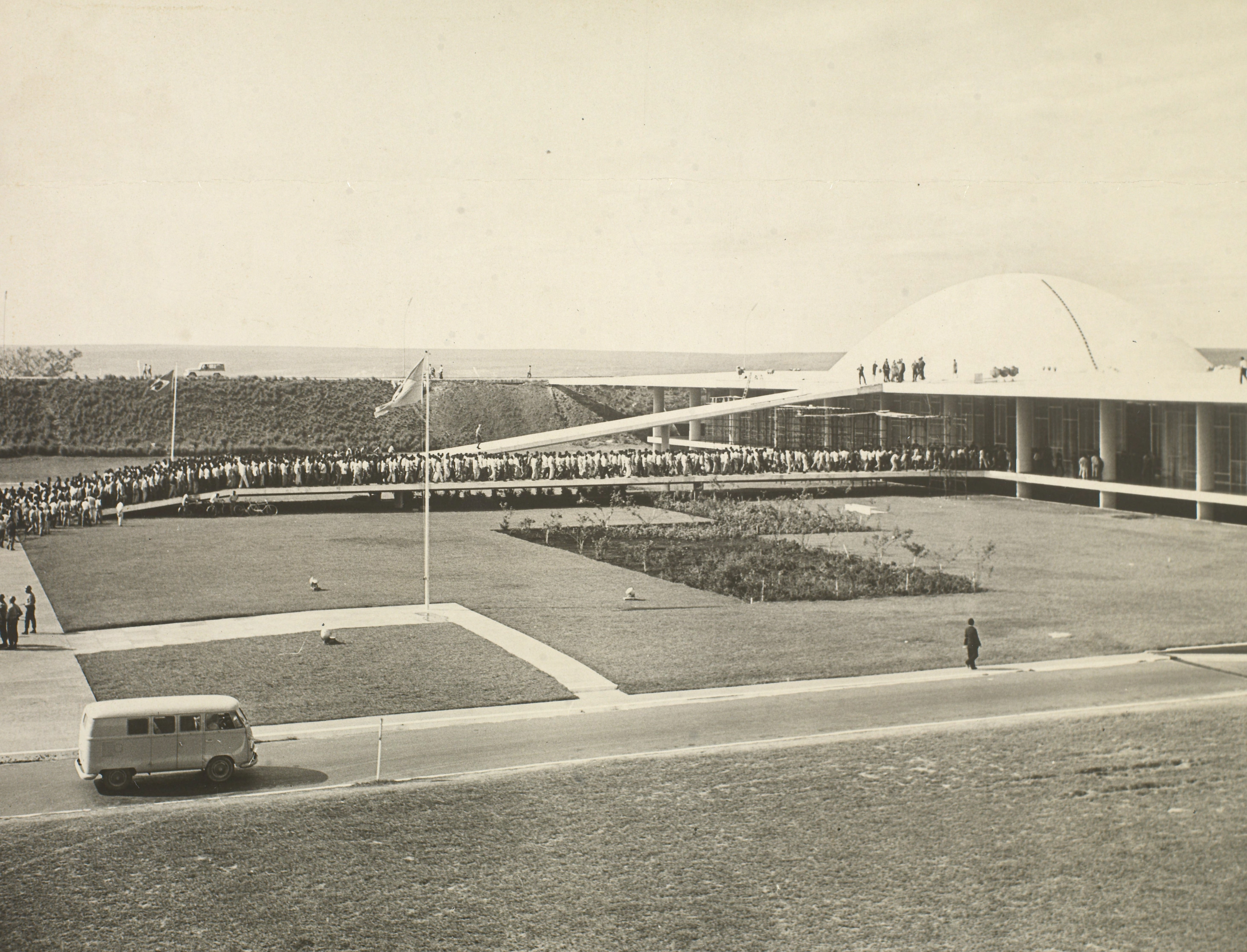
The access ramp leads directly to the Salão Negro. The ramp to the esplanade, where the domes are located, is usually closed.

=== Main building ===
Around furniture transferred from the Senate's former buildings in Rio de Janeiro, the two floors are dedicated to administrative rooms and reception halls, such as the Salão Branco and the Salão Negro. The building contains several works by major Brazilian artists, including Athos Bulcão, Marianne Peretti, Alfredo Ceschiatti, Di Cavalcanti and Burle Marx.

The upper part, the esplanade on which the domes rest, was intended to be an open public square, but it is normally closed for security reasons.

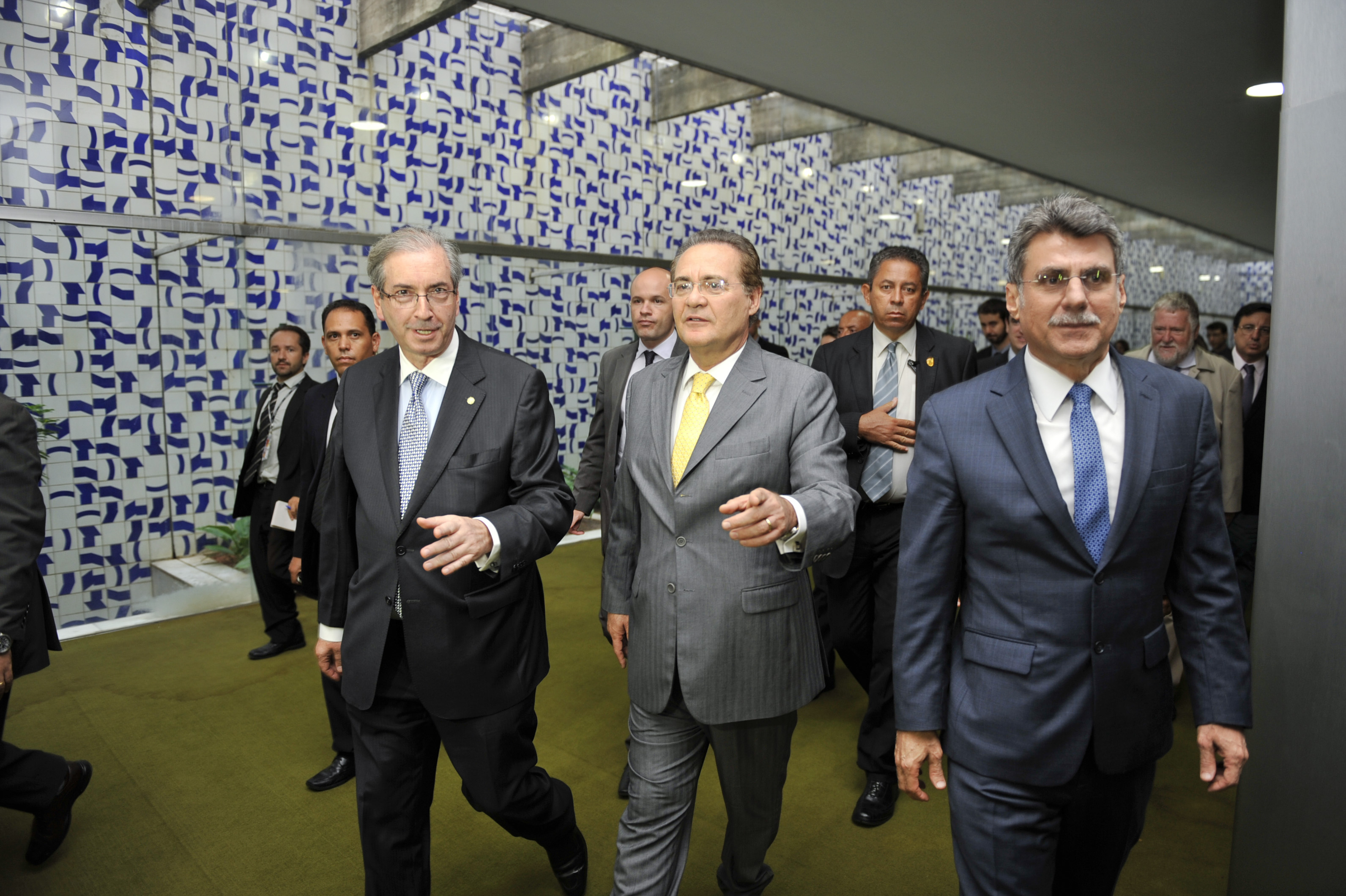
The Salão Verde is where journalists usually meet deputies.

==== Halls ====
- Salão Negro: with an area of 1,100 square metres, it is the common access point to both plenary halls, reached via the main access ramp. It also hosts exhibitions, ecumenical services and political or cultural events. Its black marble floor gives the hall its name.
- Noble Halls: there is one for each chamber. These are the spaces where the presidents of the Chamber of Deputies and the Senate receive visiting heads of state or government.
- Salão Verde: about 2,000 square metres in size, it is associated with the Chamber of Deputies and is where journalists usually interview members of parliament. It provides access to the Plenary Hall Ulysses Guimarães and to the office of the President of the Chamber. It has an internal garden and exhibitions of building models, works by visual artists and a gallery of presidents of the Chamber. Its floor lies beneath a green carpet, from which the hall takes its name.
- Salão Azul: the Senate’s equivalent of the Salão Verde, also used by the press to approach senators and providing access to the Senate plenary hall and the office of the President of the Senate. It contains a display of the flags of each Brazilian state. Its name also derives from its carpet, which is blue.

=== Domes ===
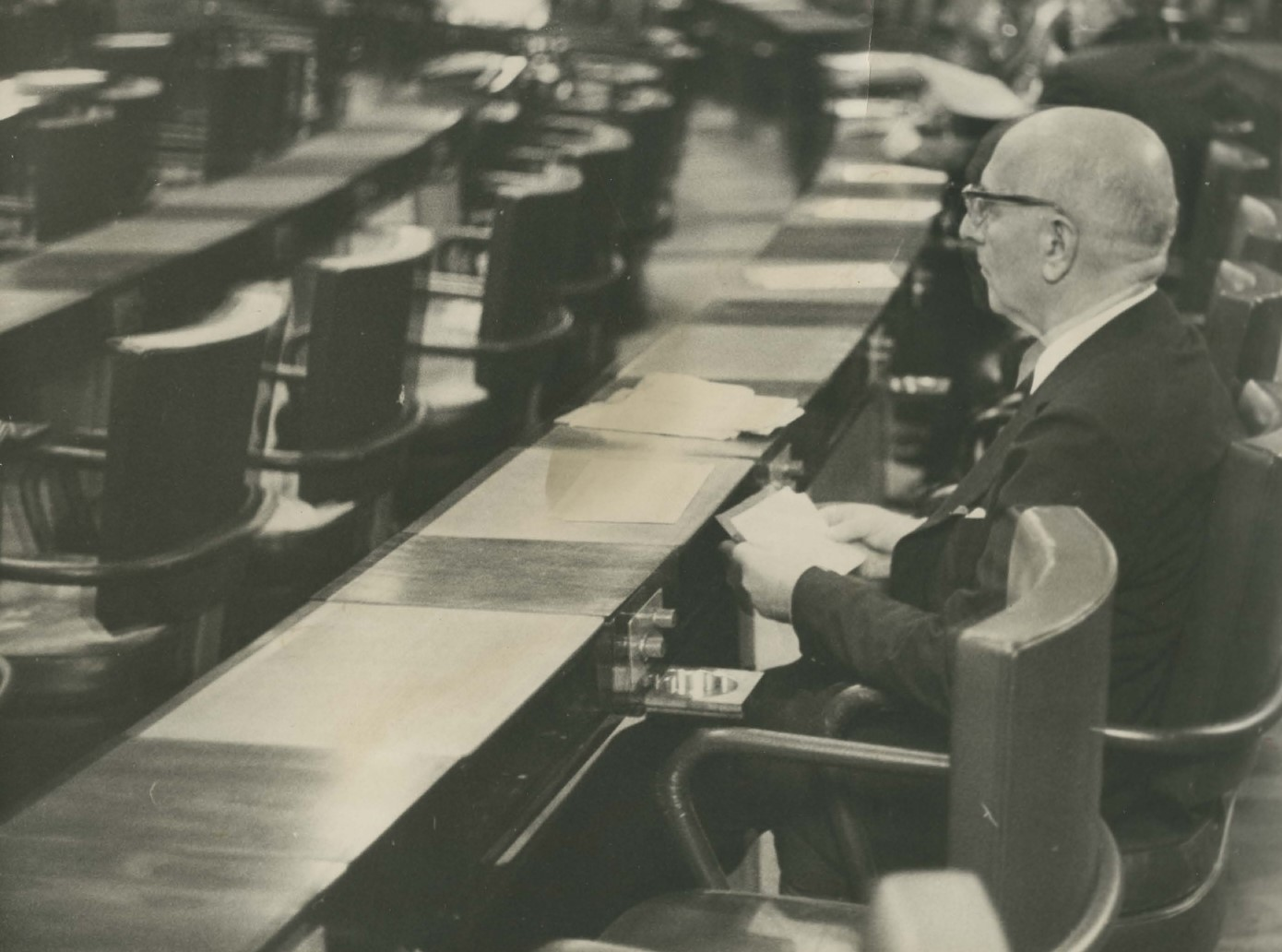
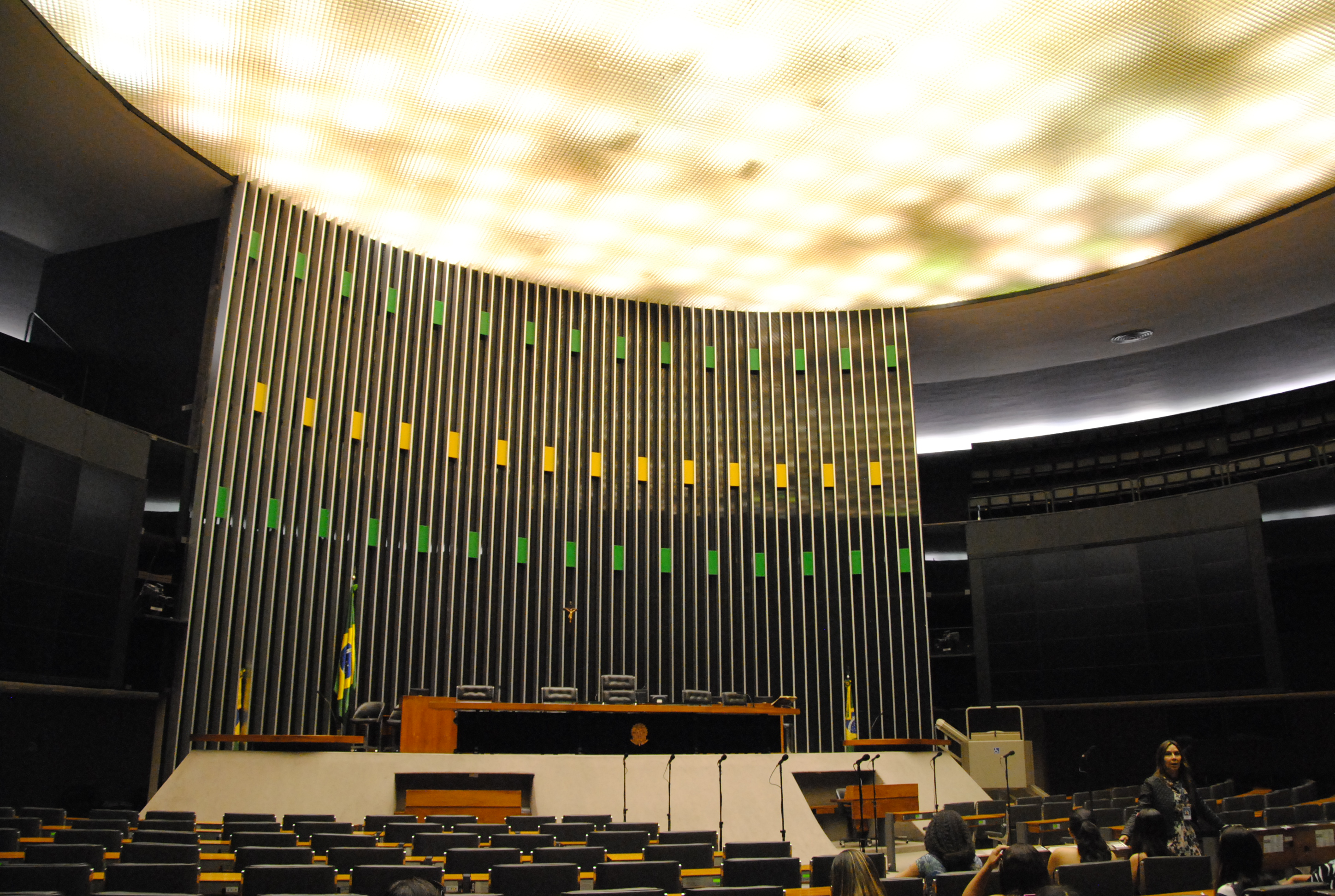
The Ulysses Guimarães Plenary Hall in 1960. Above, the ceiling conceals the point where the convex dome rests.
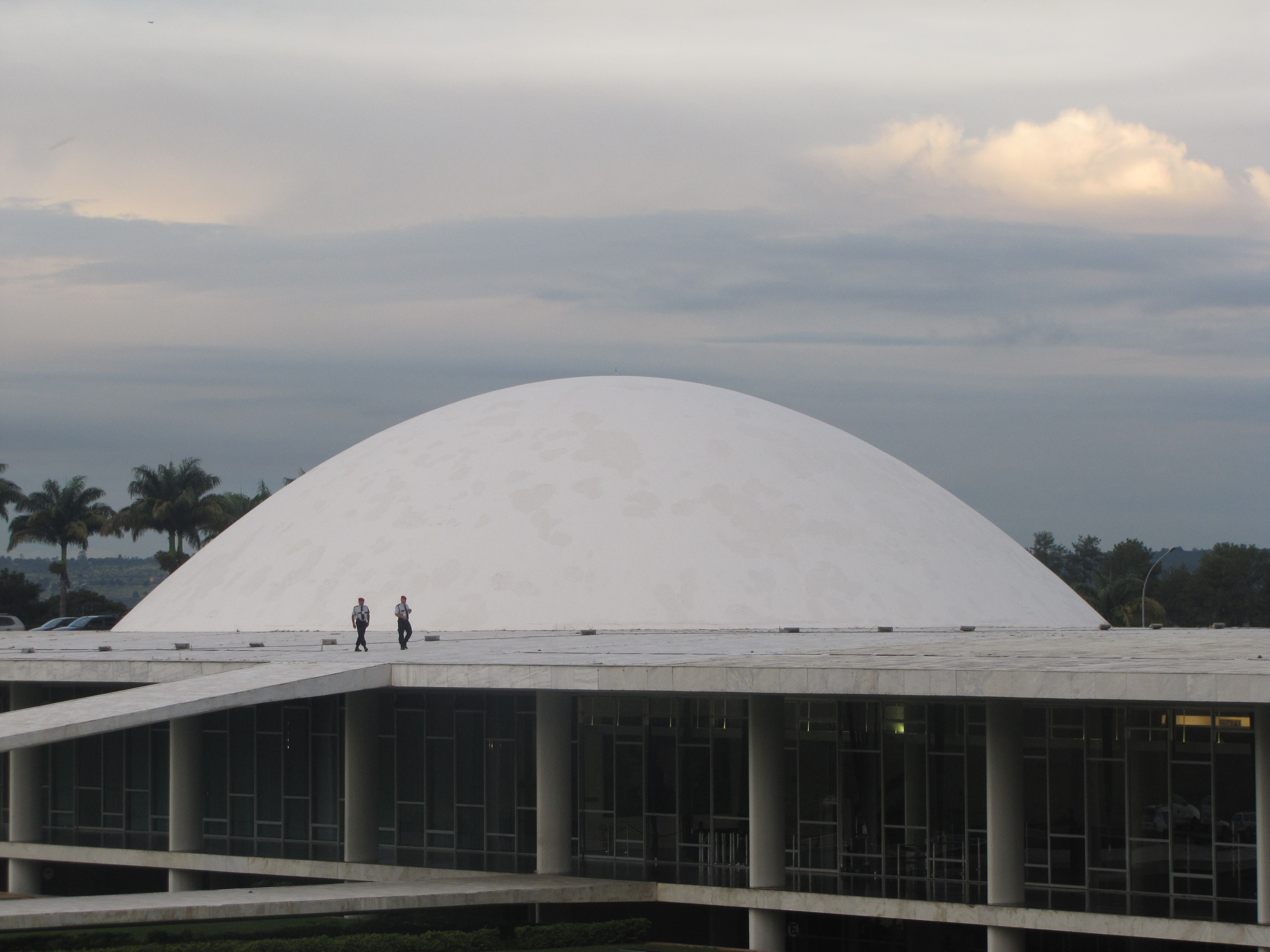
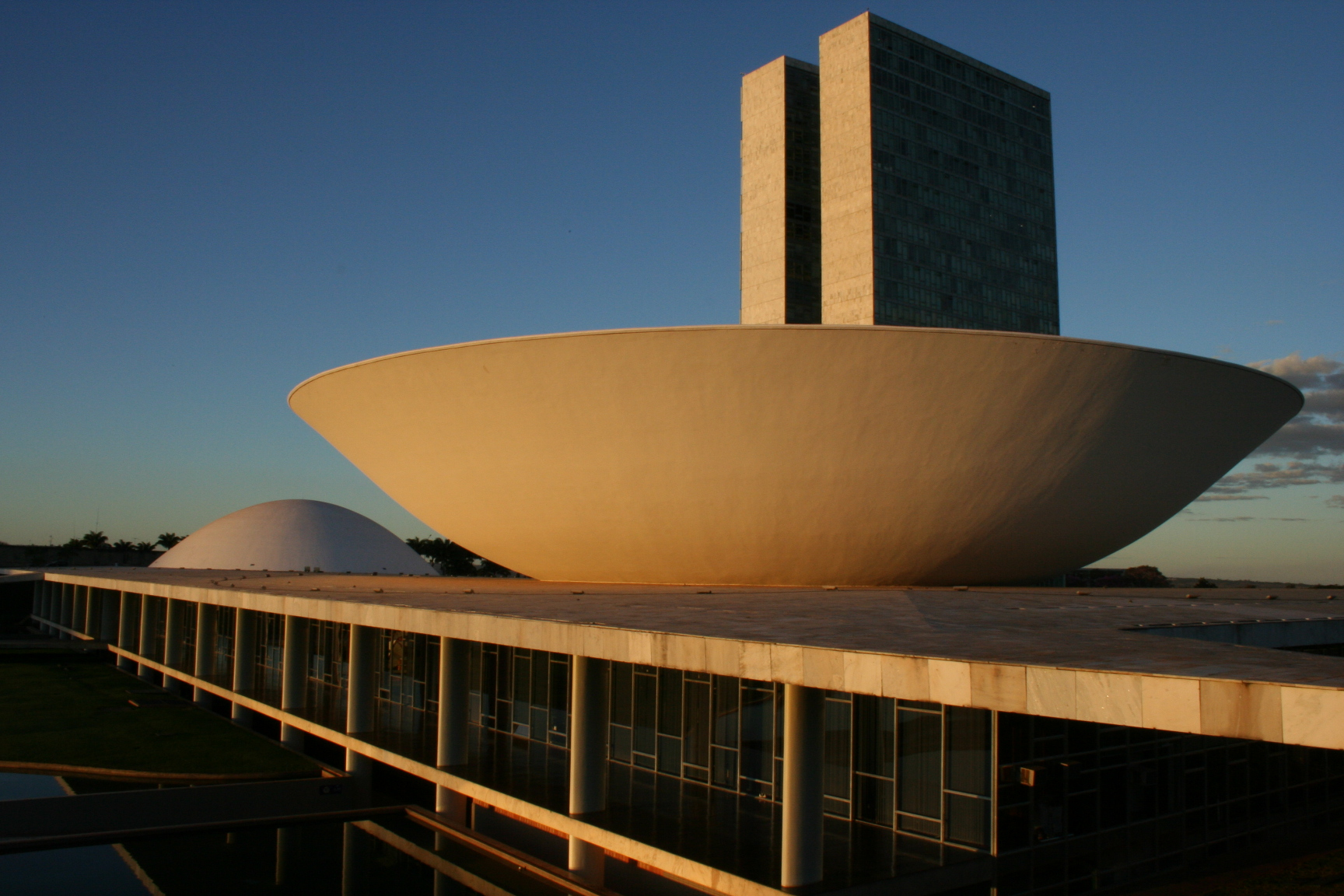
The concave dome housing the Federal Senate and the convex dome housing the Chamber of Deputies

The building has two domes. The Federal Senate is located beneath the concave dome to the left of the towers. The convex dome, shaped like an upward-facing bowl, located to the right of the towers above the Chamber of Deputies, is larger and more open. Symbolically, its broad vertex is open to all ideas and ideologies, trends, aspirations and opinions that make up the Brazilian people, represented inside the building by the deputies. Structurally, it posed a greater challenge for Joaquim Cardozo: it has the same height as the Senate dome (10 metres) but a diameter of 62 metres. It is a rotational ellipsoid, and its 22-metre span above the chamber makes the structure appear to rest only on the edges of the opening. To overcome this challenge, the roof of the convex dome was constructed as a lowered spherical shell.

=== Annexes ===
==== The towers (Annex I) ====
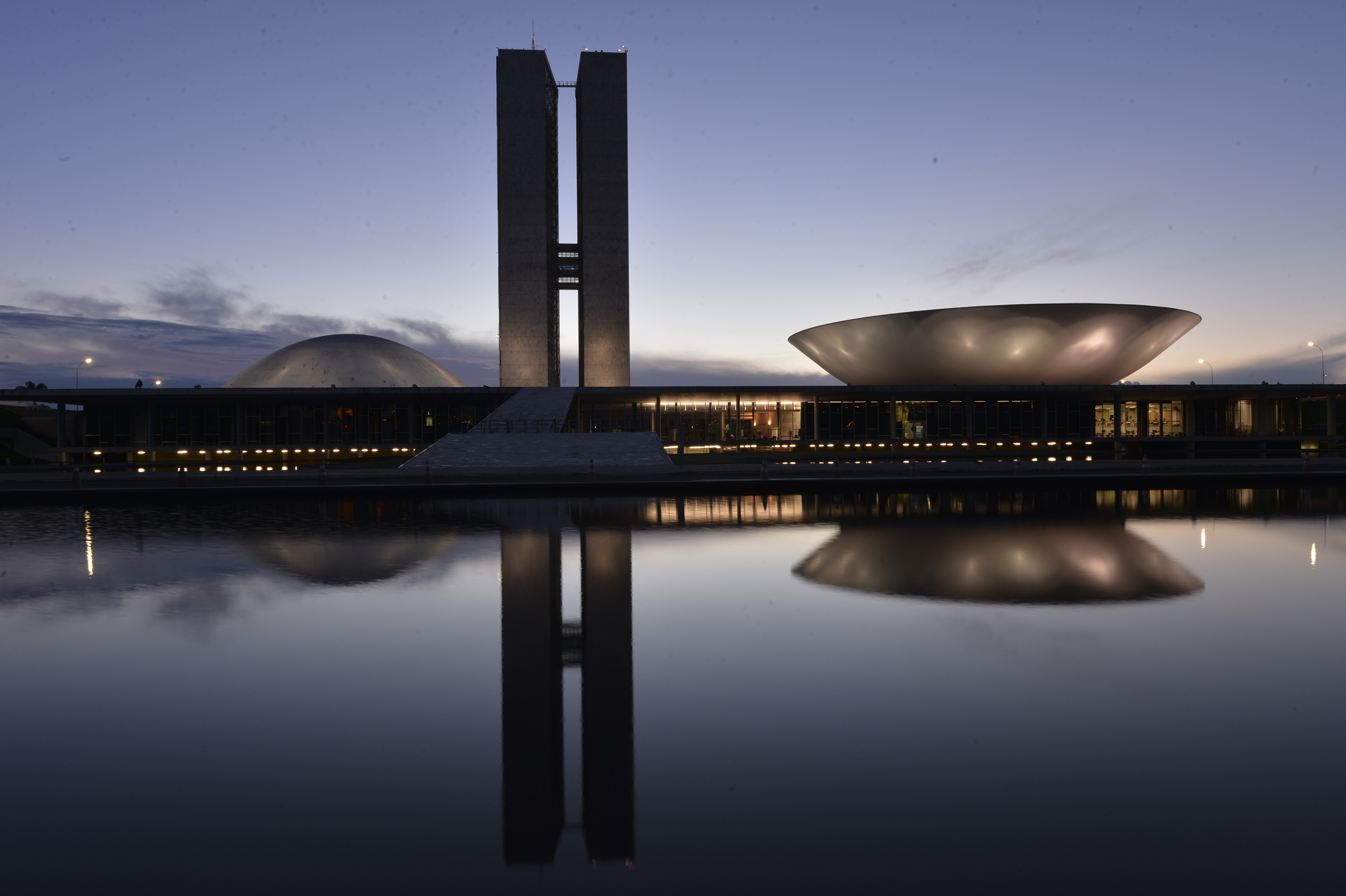
The National Congress at sunset.

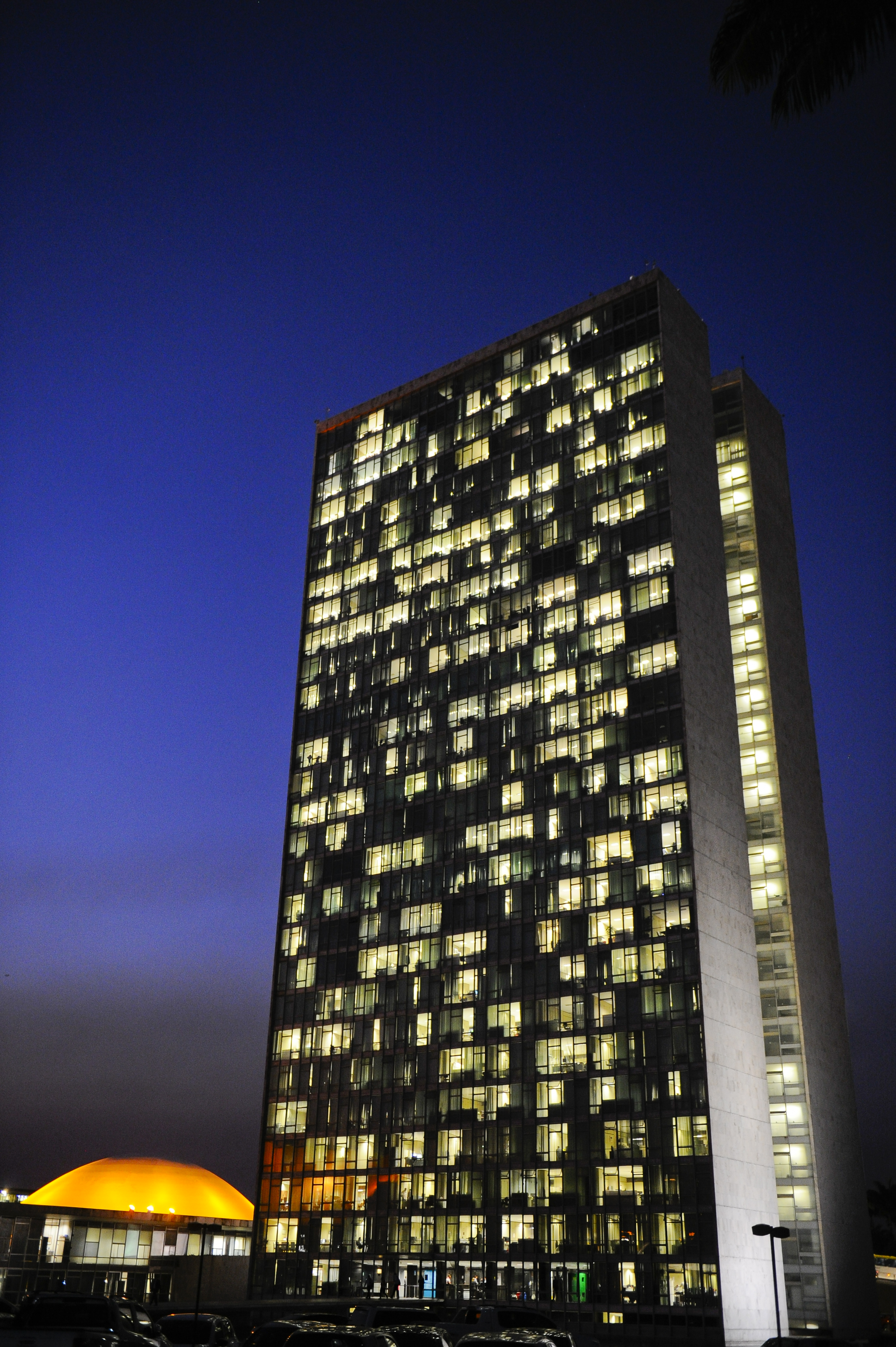
The Congress towers at night.

The complex includes two office towers with 28 floors each. Each floor measures about 45 metres in length, 10.5 metres in width on the closed façades—facing east and west—and 12.25 metres in width at the centre. They are the tallest buildings on the Esplanade and among the tallest in the Pilot Plan area. They are not exactly centred, being positioned closer to the smaller Senate dome in order to create a visual sense of balance in the composition. The structure is composed of steel columns and beams clad in concrete, with double slabs. This structure allowed the façades to function almost independently, speeding up construction. The east and west walls are enclosed with masonry and white marble. The steel beams were imported from the United States, since Brazil could not produce them quickly enough.

Contrary to what many believe, the towers are not perfect rectangles: the façades facing each other are composed of two slightly diagonal planes, subtle enough that they almost appear to form a single surface. Each tower belongs to one of the two chambers and is referred to as Annex I of the Chamber and Annex I of the Senate. Both chambers also have additional annex buildings on the other side of the Monumental Axis, housing offices of deputies and senators, committees and other facilities.

==== Annexes II, III and IV of the Chamber and Annex II of the Senate ====
The Chamber of Deputies has three annex buildings separate from the original structure, and the Senate has one more. All are connected to the main building by corridors, walkways and escalators. For the Chamber, Annex II houses the standing committees; Annex III contains some deputies' offices, the Legislative Consultancy and the Medical Department; and Annex IV contains most of the offices of federal deputies. The Senate's single annex is also called Annex II and is connected by a corridor featuring a permanent exhibition on the history of the institution since the Empire. Annex II houses the senators' offices, as well as the Senate's library and bookstore.

== Events ==
=== Death of José Kairala ===
On 4 December 1963, in the floor of the Federal Senate, there was a homicide caused by senator Arnon de Melo (PDC-AL) (father of future president of Brazil Fernando Collor de Mello) who, trying to shoot at senator Silvestre Péricles (PSD-AL), hit the substitute senator José Kairala (PSD-SC).

=== Heritage designation ===
In 2007, the year Oscar Niemeyer turned 100, the IPHAN designated the National Congress building and 34 other works by the architect as protected heritage sites.

=== 2023 storming ===
The attacks of 8 January 2023 in Brasília were a series of vandalisms, stormings and depredation of public property cause by thousands of supporters of former president Jair Bolsonaro who stormed the Planalto Palace, the National Congress Palace and the Supreme Federal Court Palace with the objective to instigate a military coup d'état against president Luiz Inácio Lula da Silva and restore Jair Bolsonaro as President of Brazil.

Around 13:00 (BRT), about 4,000 Bolsonaro supporters left the Brazilian Army Headquarters and marched towards the Three Powers Plaza, coming into conflict with the Military Police of the Federal District (PMDF) at the Monumental Axis. Before 15:00, the crowd broke the security barrier established by the security forces and occupied the ramp and roof of the National Congress Palace, while part of the group could storm and vandalize the Congress, the Planalto Palace and the Supreme Court Palace. President Lula and former president Bolsonaro were not present in Brasília during the storming. The Supreme Federal Court considered the storming as acts of terrorism.

Governor of the Federal District, Ibaneis Rocha, informed that more than 400 people were arrested until 21:00. On the following day, around 1,200 people that were camping in front of the Army HQ were also arrested and taken by bus to the head office of the Federal Police. Until March 2023, 2,182 people were arrested for participating or having any kind of involvement in the attacks. Right after the events, Ibaneis Rocha fired the Public Security Secretary and former Minister of Justice of Bolsonaro administration, Anderson Torres, who was in Orlando during the stormings. After that, justice of the Supreme Federal Court, Alexandre de Moraes, suspended Rocha from office for 90 days, decision revoked on 15 March. After the attacks, president Lula signed a decree authorizing a federal intervention in the Federal District until 31 January.

Government representatives criticized the event and stated that the responsible by the violent acts, as well as the funders and instigators, will be identified and punished. Leaders of many Brazilian parties criticized the invasion, considering it a serious attack against democracy and demanded the punishment of the responsibles. Many world leaders also condemned the invasion, expressing their solidarity with the Brazilian government. Many analysts compared the event with the United States Capitol storming in 2021 by Donald Trump supporters, who refused to accept his defeat in the elections. Many social movements called for protests against the invasion and in defense of democracy, which took place on 9 January in São Paulo, Rio de Janeiro, Porto Alegre, Recife, Curitiba, Belo Horizonte and other cities, gathering thousands of people.

== Gallery ==
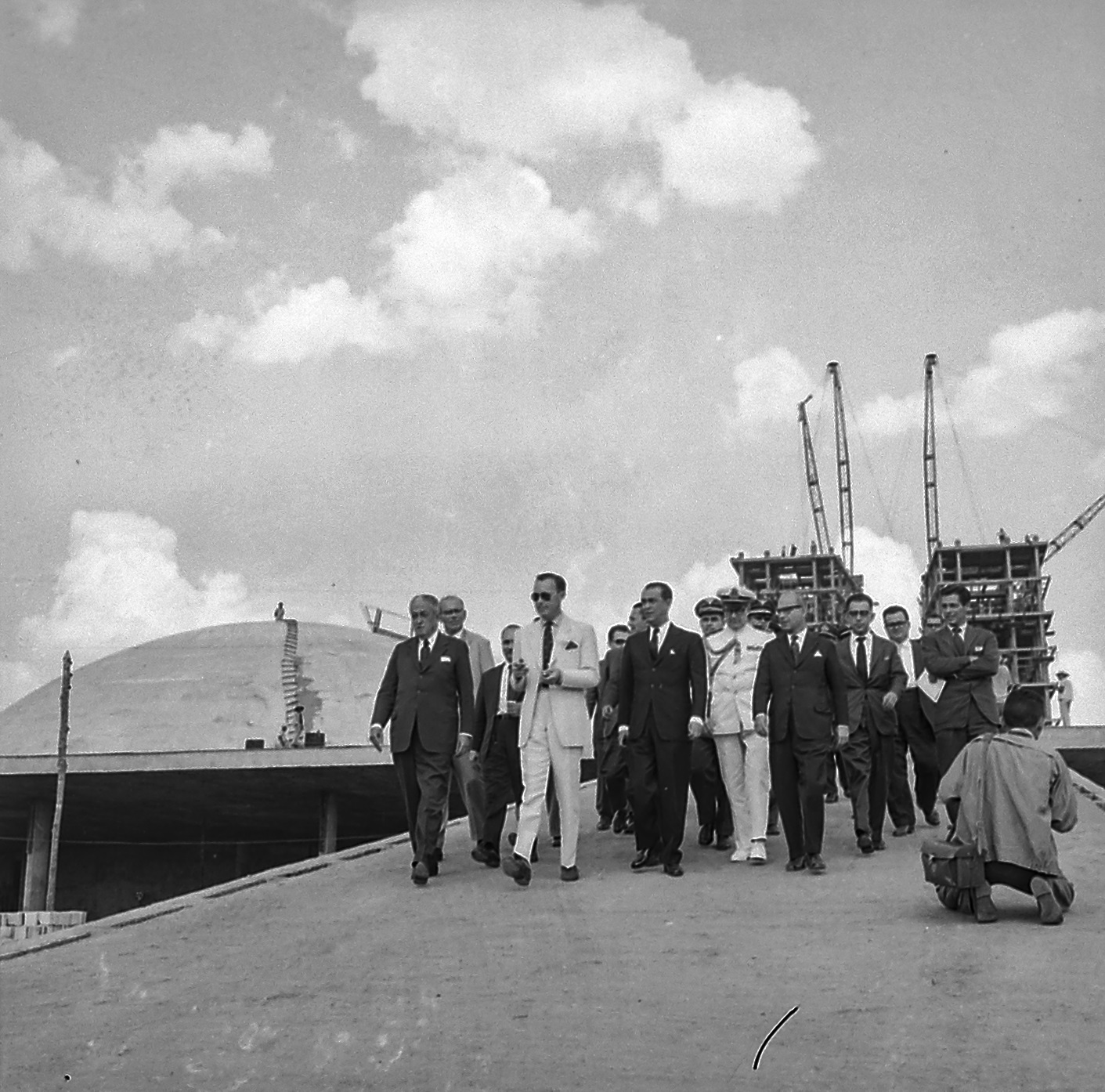
Juscelino Kubitschek visiting the works of the National Congress.
