= Pedro Aurélio de Góis Monteiro =

Brazilian military officer and politician (1889–1956)

Góis Monteiro
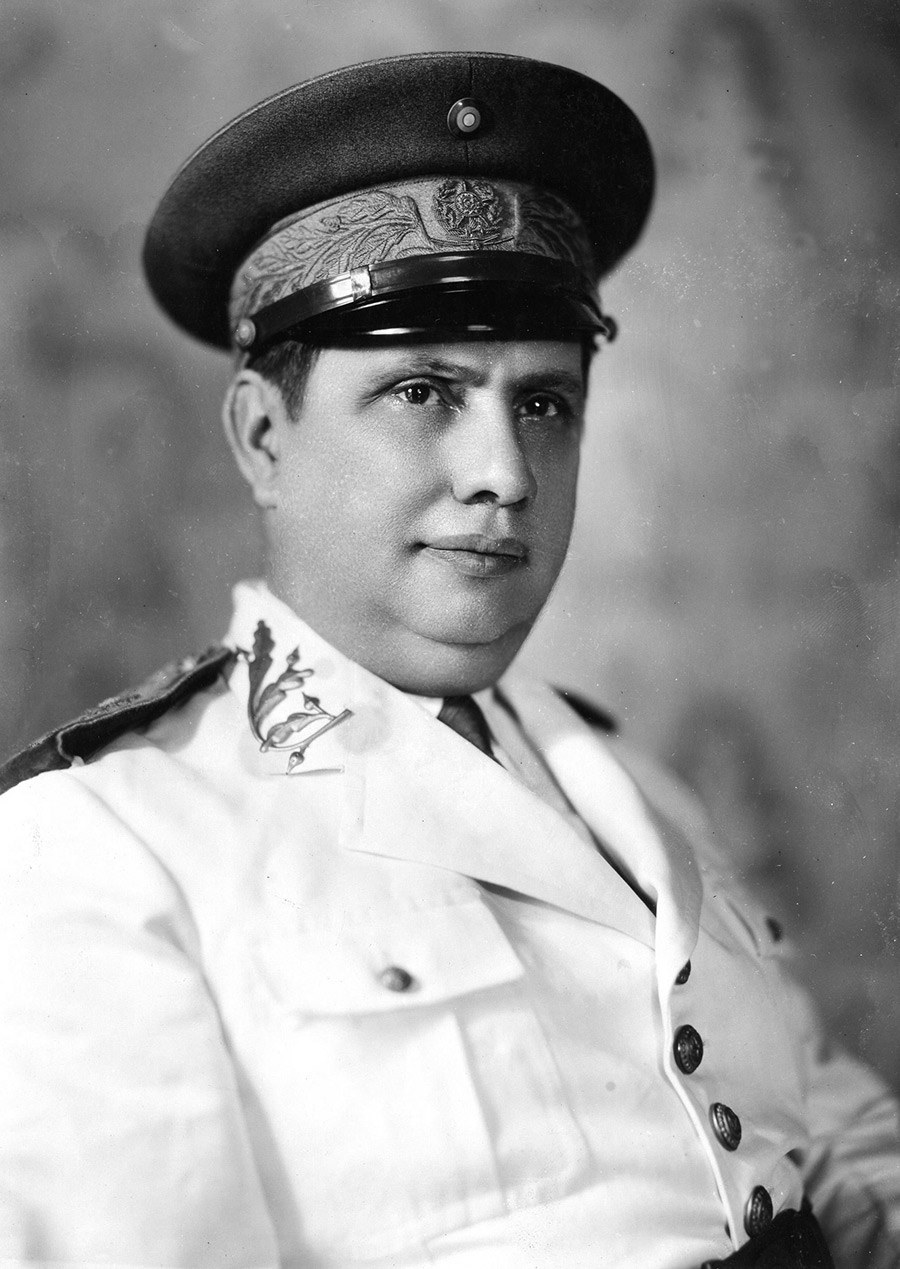
- Góis Monteiro, 1937

Justice of the Superior Military Court
- In office 15 December 1952 – 16 October 1956
- Nominated by: Getúlio Vargas
- Preceded by: Mário Ary Pires
- Succeeded by: Olympio Falconièri da Cunha

Chief of the Armed Forces General Staff
- In office 15 February 1951 – 1 December 1952
- President: Getúlio Vargas
- Preceded by: Salvador César Obino
- Succeeded by: Mascarenhas de Morais

Minister of War
- In office 9 August 1945 – 14 October 1946
- President: Getúlio Vargas; José Linhares; Eurico Gaspar Dutra
- Preceded by: Eurico Gaspar Dutra
- Succeeded by: Canrobert Pereira da Costa
- In office 18 January 1934 – 7 May 1935
- President: Getúlio Vargas
- Preceded by: Espírito Santo Cardoso
- Succeeded by: João Gomes Ribeiro Filho

Chief of the Army General Staff
- In office 2 July 1937 – 27 December 1943
- President: Getúlio Vargas
- Preceded by: Arnaldo Paes de Andrade
- Succeeded by: Maurício José Cardoso

Personal details
- Born: 12 December 1889 São Luís do Quitunde, Alagoas, Brazil
- Died: 16 October 1956 (aged 66) Rio de Janeiro, Federal District, Brazil
- Party: PSD
- Spouse: Conceição Saint Pastous
- Relations: Silvestre Péricles (brother)
- Children: 2
- Occupation: Military officer; politician

Military service
- Allegiance: Brazil
- Branch/service: Brazilian Army
- Years of service: 1907–1956
- Rank: Army general
- Commands: List: 2nd Military Region; 1st Military Region; Army General Staff; Brazilian Army; Armed Forces General Staff
- Góis Monteiro's voice Inauguration speech by Góis Monteiro as Minister of War (recorded 1945)

Pedro Aurélio de Góis Monteiro (12 December 1889 – 16 October 1956) was a Brazilian army general and politician, noted as one of the architects of the Cohen Plan and of the subsequent 1937 Brazilian coup d'état.

== Biography ==
Pedro Aurélio de Góis Monteiro was born in São Luís do Quitunde, Alagoas. The son of Pedro Aureliano Monteiro dos Santos and Constança Cavalcanti de Góis Monteiro. Coming from a family with military tradition, he began his career at the Porto Alegre War School and reached the rank of army general. Over the years he adopted a loyalist stance when fighting the Copacabana Fort revolt, tenentism and the Prestes Column during the 1920s. The outbreak of the Revolution of 1930 led him to exercise military command of it, contributing to its success.

From 1 June 1931 to 25 April 1932, he commanded the 2nd Military Region, based in São Paulo.

He also commanded the 1st Military Region, in Rio de Janeiro, between 24 May and 9 July 1932.

He then commanded the federal troops that put down the Constitutionalist Revolution of 1932 and, during the fighting, he lost his brother, captain Cícero Augusto de Góis Monteiro, who was a member of the 9th Infantry Regiment of the Brazilian Army.

After this event, he was appointed Minister of War in the Getúlio Vargas government, between 18 January 1934 and 7 May 1935, until Eurico Gaspar Dutra was chosen as his successor, which did not prevent Góis Monteiro from actively participating of the establishment and maintenance of the Estado Novo (1937–1945), an event that helped consolidate his family as the dominant political force in Alagoas, a state governed by two of his brothers between 1941 and 1945.

Demonstrating the fascist stance of Getúlio Vargas' political actors during the Estado Novo, among whom Góis Monteiro was one of the most prominent names, Cláudio de Lacerda Paiva described the Vargas government agents in the following terms: "the one who censored was Lourival Fontes, the one who tortured was Filinto Muller, the one who instituted fascism was Francisco Campos, the one who carried out the coup was Dutra and the one who supported Hitler was Góis Monteiro".

At the time he was Minister of War, he drafted the National Security Doctrine that inspired several laws in this regard both in the Vargas Era and in the 1964 military regime. In September 1937, Góis Monteiro "discovered" the Cohen Plan, which was a false planning, written by the then captain Olímpio Mourão Filho, of a communist revolution in Brazil. This plan was later used by Vargas as justification for the 1937 coup that gave rise to the Estado Novo.

In the 1934 indirect presidential election, he came third, winning 4 votes (1.61%).

Góes Monteiro was Chief of Staff of the Army between 2 July 1937 and 27 December 1943.

He returned to the Ministry of War in the last days of Vargas in power, on 9 August 1945. He remained in the position during the José Linhares government and in the first months of the Dutra administration, until 14 October 1946.

After leaving power, he was elected senator for the Social Democratic Party in 1947. In 1945, his brother Ismar de Góis Monteiro had been elected to that same position and in 1958 it was Silvestre Péricles' turn to reach the country's senate. However, in 1950 Pedro Aurélio was unable to be re-elected and even rejected an invitation to be vice-president on the Vargas ticket.

He was chief of the General Staff of the Armed Forces between 15 February 1951 and 1 December 1952. He was then a justice in the Superior Military Court, from 15 December 1952 until his death on 16 October 1956.
