= José Guiomard =

Brazilian politician (1907–1983)

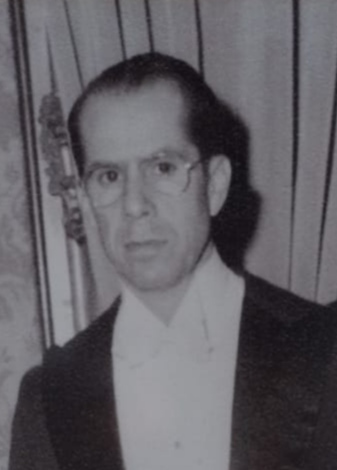

Senator of Acre
- In office 1963–1983
- Preceded by: José Kairala
- Succeeded by: Altevir Leal

Federal deputy for Acre
- In office 1951–1963

Governor of the Federal Territory of Acre
- In office 1946–1950
- Preceded by: Luís Silvestre Gomes Coelho
- Succeeded by: Raimundo Pinheiro Filho

Personal details
- Born: José Guiomard dos Santos; 23 March 1907 Santo Antônio do Monte, Minas Gerais, Brazil
- Died: 15 March 1983 (aged 75) Rio de Janeiro, Brazil
- Party: AIB; PDS; ARENA; PDS
- Spouse: Lídia Hannes Guiomard dos Santos

José Guiomard dos Santos, better known as José Guiomard, (23 March 1907 – 15 March 1983) was a Brazilian soldier and politician in the state of Acre, where he served as governor and later as senator.

== Biography ==
Guiomard was born in Perdigão, then a district of Santo Antônio do Monte in the state of Minas Gerais. The son of José Batista dos Santos and Bárbara Guiomard dos Santos, he moved to Barbacena, where he enrolled in military school. He would later move to the state of Rio de Janeiro, enrolling again in the Military School of Realengo in 1925 and afterwards in institutions such as the Escola Politécnica da UFRJ, and the Technical Military School of the Federal University of Rio de Janeiro, specialising in astronomy and geodesy.

Becoming an employee of the Ministry of Foreign Affairs from 1934 to 1938, he was the subchief of the commission that established the geographical borders between Brazil, Paraguay, and Venezuela, becoming a member of the Geographic and Historic Institute of Amazonas, the Academia Acriana de Letras, and, when he moved to the state of Rio de Janeiro, also became a member of the Clube Militar, the Engineers' Club of Rio de Janeiro, and the Brazilian Geography Society. It was during this time that he became friends with San Tiago Dantas and became a member of the Brazilian Integralist Action, and always maintained loyalty to integralist principles even after the creation of the Estado Novo regime. Before becoming involved in politics, he was a writer for Correio Braziliense, among other newspapers. He also wrote several books, among them Cinquentenário do Tratado de Petrópolis, Mensagem do Acre and Territórios Federais, Grandezas e Misérias.

A columnist in the military schools he attended, he was an attorney in Ponta Porã Territory before affiliating with the PSD. He was the governor of the Federal Territory of Acre during the presidency of Eurico Gaspar Dutra, but later resigned from his seat to become a federal deputy, starting in 1950. As deputy, he developed a reputation as leading the opposition against Oscar Passos and his fellow PTB members. During his time in the Chamber of Deputies, he proposed the law that transformed Acre from a federal territory to a state, with the law passing in 1962.

He was elected senator in 1962 and was a supporter of the fall of then-president João Goulart. He was later replaced by his substitute José Kairala, but returned to the seat shortly afterwards after Kairala was assassinated. He was reelected in 1970 and 1978 as part of ARENA, the latter term as a "bionic senator". With partisan reforms towards the end of the military dictatorship, he reaffiliated with the PDS. He later died during this term due to broncopneumonia.

After Guiomard's death, the municipality of Quinari, the base of his political support, was renamed Senador Guiomard, and was succeeded in the senate by Altevir Leal.

He was married to Lídia Hannes Guiomard dos Santos.
