= Altevir Leal =

Brazilian politician (1928 – 1999)

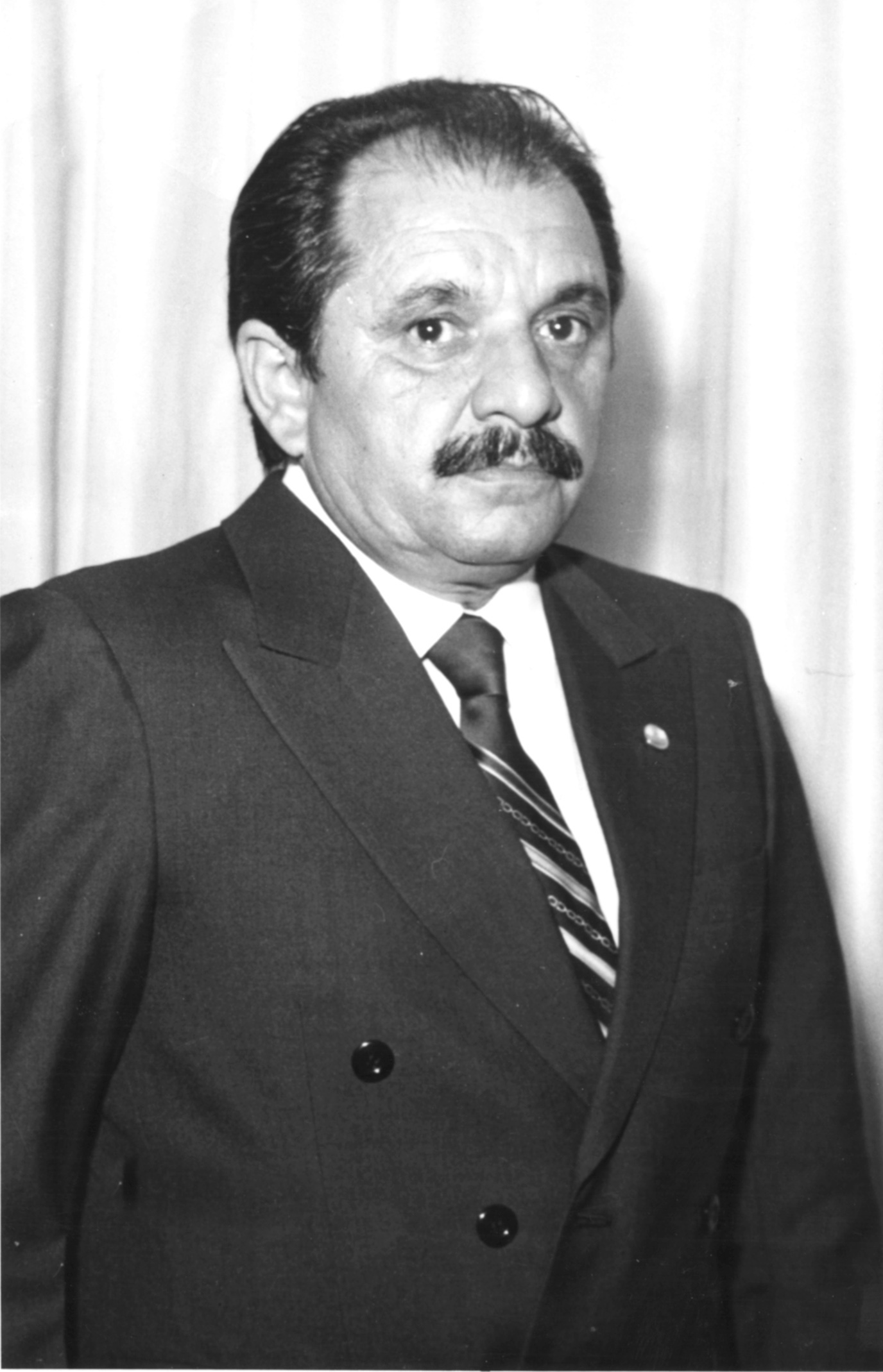

Senator of Acre
- In office 1975–1979
- Preceded by: Geraldo Mesquita
- In office 1983–1987
- Preceded by: José Guiomard

Personal details
- Born: 24 July 1928 Tarauacá, Acre, Brazil
- Died: 1999 Rio Branco, Acre, Brazil
- Party: PSD; ARENA; PDS

Altevir Leal (24 July 1928 – 1999) was a Brazilian ship owner, merchant, industrialist, and rancher who served for two mandates as the senator from the state of Acre, first from 1975 to 1979, and again from 1983 to 1987.

== Biography ==
Leal was the son of Avelino Leal and Maria Assunção Morais Leal, both of Portuguese background. He was born in Tarauacá on 24 July 1928. His father being a merchant as well, he came to be part of local commercial trade, as well as work in other professions. His brother Albanir was the first to enter politics, becoming a substitute for federal deputies from the PSD in 1962 and remained there until 28 September 1966, days after the nomination of Jorge Kalume to the state government of Acre. Altevir became a member of ARENA and was elected as the first substitute for senator Geraldo Mesquita in 1970, later becoming senator after Mesquita became state governor by order of president Ernesto Geisel in 1974. In 1978, he was elected again as the first substitute of senator José Guiomard, being elevated to office after Guiomards death in 1983, after having already been affiliated with the PDS.
