= Homicide at the Brazilian Senate =

1963 shooting of a Brazilian senator

Death of José Kairala
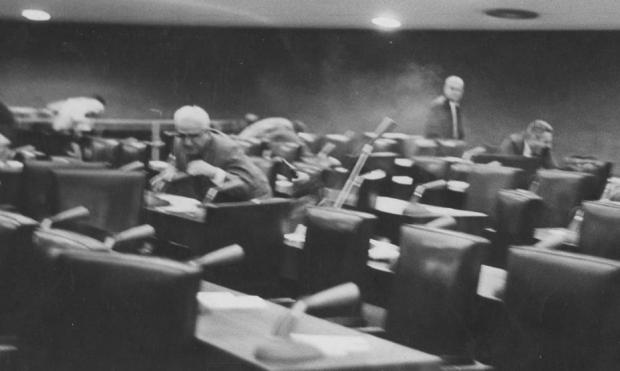
- Photograph depicting the moment after the incident
- Location: Federal Senate in Brasília, Federal District; Brazil
- Date: 4 December 1963; 62 years ago
- Target: Silvestre Péricles (PST-AL)
- Attack type: Legislative violence
- Deaths: José Kairala (PSD-AC)
- Assailant: Arnon de Melo (PDC-AL)
- Motive: Fight between senators Arnon de Melo and Silvestre Péricles
- Verdict: Acquitted for self-defense

The homicide at the Brazilian Federal Senate occurred on December 4, 1963 inside the Brazilian Federal Senate, at Brasília. The event involved a shooting carried out by senator Arnon de Melo (PDC-AL), who tried to shoot senator Silvestre Péricles (PST-AL) and ended up hitting and killing substitute Senator José Kairala (PSD-AC).

== Background ==
External videos
- Video containing the audio of the senate session

The confusion began some time before, with discussions between Senators Arnon de Melo and Silvestre Pericles, because both were from families with certain political notoriety in the state of Alagoas, the rise of both families in politics ended up generating a certain conflict.

This ascension affected mainly the Pericles, who had been in regional and federal political positions longer than the Mello's, who would later occupy more relevant positions with the arrival of Fernando Collor de Mello, Arnon's son, to the presidency of Brazil.

Then Pericles had been provoking Arnon, who, to defend himself from a supposed threat, started carrying a gun.

== Shooting ==
Arnon, who had attended few sessions of the Senate, was provoked by Pericles to attend even the federal session on December 4, 1963.

After these provocations, Arnon came to the session armed. Knowing the risk he was taking, Pericles also came to the session armed.

After asking for the floor, Arnon made a speech talking about the threats he and his family were facing, and when Pericles started to advance, Arnon shot him. Pericles threw himself on the ground, drawing his gun, but João Agripino prevented him from shooting Arnon.

After the shooting, it was found that a third senator who was trying to break up the fight was hit. That senator was José Kairala, from the state of Acre and from the same party as Pericles.

José Kairala was occupying the section as a substitute due a health problem suffered by senator José Guiomard. Because it was his last session in the Federal Senate, Kairala had brought his wife and children to attend the session. He died at the hospital later that day. Because of the confusion, the session was canceled until further notice by its president, Auro de Moura Andrade.

== Consequences ==
Both senators were taken to the police station to give their statements. After the statements, Senator Arnon remained in custody and in possession of his revolver.

After a few hours in jail, Arnon was released with the promise to attend a hearing, where he was released on the grounds of self-defense and the death was treated as an accident.

Kairala's widow tried to get Arnon to pay for her son's school expenses, but her request was unsuccessful.

== Other cases ==
On December 26, 1929, when the Federal District was still in Rio de Janeiro, congressman Ildefonso Simões Lopes shot and killed rival Manuel Francisco de Sousa Filho, allegedly to defend his son. He was acquitted.

On June 8, 1967, in the Chamber of Deputies, deputy Nelson Carneiro retaliated against a slap by deputy Estácio Gonçalves Souto Maior after they had argued over the presidency of the Parliamentary Union a few days earlier, by shooting Souto Maior. Both survived and were later acquitted.
