= Senador Guiomard =

Municipality of Acre, Brazil

- Municipality
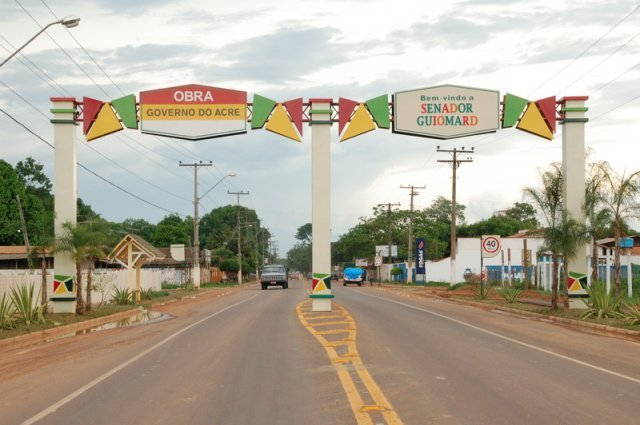

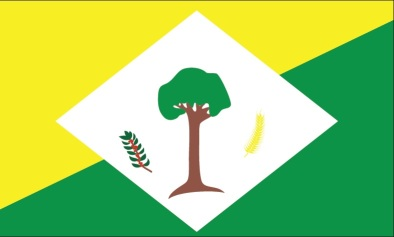
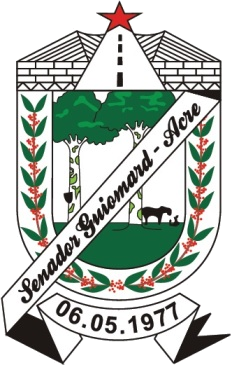
- Flag Coat of arms

- Location of municipality in Acre State

- Location in Brazil
- Coordinates: 10°09′03″S 67°44′09″W
- Country: Brazil
- State: Acre

Government
  - Mayor: Andre Maia (PSD)

Area
  - Total: 790 sq mi (2,047 km^{2})

Population (2022)
  - Total: 21,454
- Time zone: UTC−5 (ACT)

Senador Guiomard (Brazilian Portuguese pronunciation: [senaˈdoʁ ɡi.oˈmaʁ(dʒi)]) is a municipality located in the northeast of the Brazilian state of Acre. Its population is 21,454 and its area is 2,047 km^{2}. The town is named after former senator José Guiomard.
