= Geraldo Mesquita Júnior =

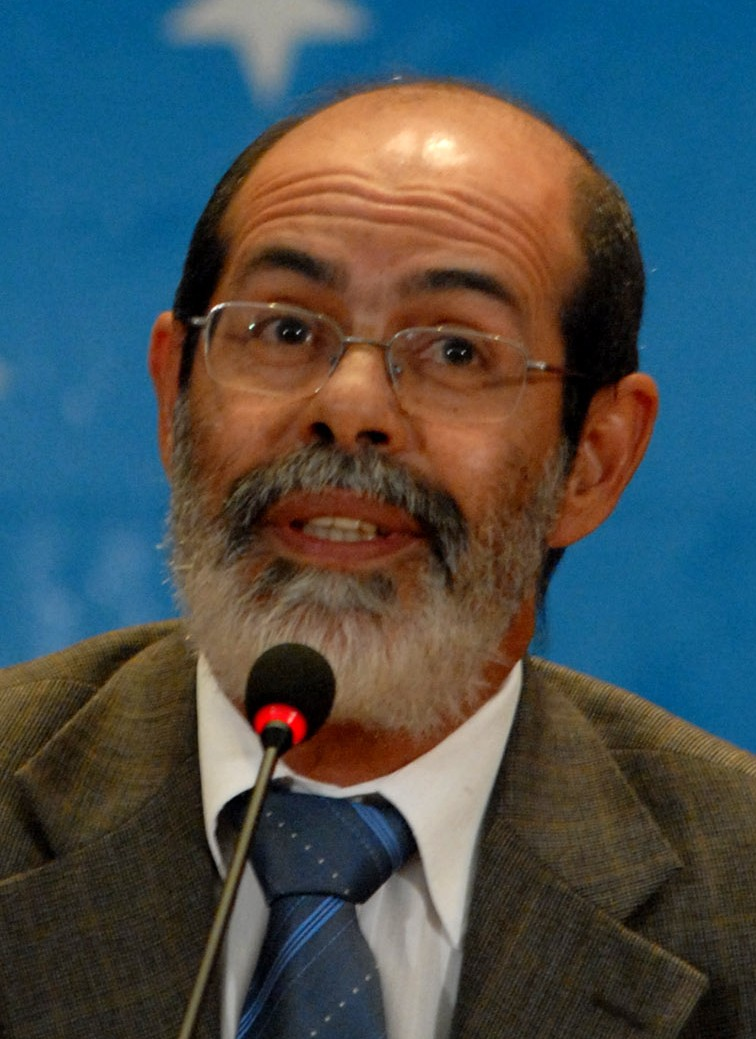
- Júnior in February 2008

Senator of Acre
- In office 1 February 2001 – 1 February 2011

Personal details
- Born: Geraldo Gurgel de Mesquita Júnior; 6 November 1948 (age 77) Fortaleza, Brazil
- Geraldo Mesquita Júnior's voice Recorded on 26 October 2005

Geraldo Gurgel de Mesquita Júnior (born on 11 November 1948), is a Brazilian lawyer and politician of the state of Acre. He served as Senator of the Republic by the PMDB from 2001 to 2011. He is the son of politician Geraldo Gurgel de Mesquita.

== Biography ==
He was private secretary of the governor and superintendent of the development of strategic areas of Acre from 14 February 1977 to 15 March 1979.

He studied law at the Federal District Unified Teaching Association (UDF) in Brasilia, between 1981 and 1987.

In 1990 he became a representative of the Acre State Government in Brasilia, a position he held until 1991. As early as 2000 he was head of the Civil Office of the State Government. In 2002 he was an extraordinary secretary of the Institutional Articulation, and Attorney of the National Treasury since June 1, 1993.

He was elected senator in 2002 by the PSB with 104 993 votes (21.53% of valid votes).

In October 2005, he paraded from PSOL, for which he had a quick passage when he left the PSB, and later joined the PMDB in January 2006.

He presided over the Mercosur Parliament.
