= 1963 in Brazilian television =

This is a list of Brazilian television related events from 1963.

== Ending this year ==
- Sítio do Pica-pau Amarelo (1952–1963)

== Networks and services ==
=== Launches ===
Network	Type	Launch date	Notes	Source
TV Excelsior Rio de Janeiro	Terrestrial	1 September		
RPC Londrina	Terrestrial	21 September		
TV Anhanguera (Goiânia)	Terrestrial	24 October		
TV Difusora (São Luís)	Terrestrial	24 October		

== Births ==
- 6 February – Cláudia Ohana, actress
- 4 September – Tatola Godas, presenter
- 15 December – Cristiana Oliveira, actress

== See also ==
- 1963 in Brazil
