= Geographic and Historic Institute of Amazonas =

Cultural institute in Brazil

Coordinates: 3°8′1″S 60°1′44″W

- Instituto Geográfico e Histórico do Amazonas
- Interactive map of the Geographic and Historic Institute of Amazonas area
- Former names: Bernardo Ramos' house

General information
- Type: Institute; Historical Society; Historical Heritage; Archive
- Location: Manaus, Amazonas, Brazil
- Construction started: 1917

Design and construction
- Designations: Listed by CEDPHA in 1980

The Geographic and Historic Institute of Amazonas (Portuguese: Instituto Geográfico e Histórico do Amazonas — IGHA), also known as the Bernardo Ramos' house (Casa de Bernardo Ramos), is a cultural institute focused on history and science, dedicated to archival preservation and research. It was established in 1917 and designated as a historical heritage site by the State Council for the Defense of Historic and Artistic Heritage of Amazonas (Conselho Estadual de Defesa do Patrimônio Histórico Artístico do Amazonas — CEDPHA) in 1980.

== History ==
The process of establishing the IGHA began on March 11, 1917, with the first recorded meeting, during which a commission was appointed to draft the institution's statutes. Members of the commission included Bernardo de Azevedo da Silva Ramos, Vivaldo Palma Lima, Henrique Rubin, Antonio Ribeiro Clemente Bittencourt, and Agnello Bittencourt, the latter three holding the rank of colonel. The statutes were signed by Governor Pedro de Alcântara Bacellar, officially founding the institute, by decrees No. 1190 of April 10, 1917, and No. 1991 of April 18, 1917. At the IGHA's inaugural assembly on March 25, 1917, the governor also appointed the members of the administrative body and working committees. The administrative positions were filled as follows: Bernardo Ramos as president, Agnello Bittencourt as first secretary, Henrique Rubin as second secretary, Antonio Bittencourt as treasurer, and Vivaldo Lima as speaker.

According to its founding statutes, the IGHA was authorized to conduct research in a wide range of fields, including history, anthropology, philosophy, astronomy, botany, regional boundary studies, geology, agriculture, commerce, and navigation, as well as to manage diverse documents related to the region. Similar to the Brazilian Historic and Geographic Institute at the time, the IGHA maintained close ties to the State, and the cultural narratives it promoted were regarded as official. Additionally, the institute played a significant role in addressing gaps in intellectual production about the Amazon region.

== Collection ==
Since its founding in 1917, the IGHA has been housed in a two-story building on Frei José dos Inocentes Street, No. 19 and No. 21, located in the historic center of Manaus. The institute’s collection includes legal documents, pamphlets, magazines, and newspapers, with materials dating back to the provincial era and the early years of the First Brazilian Republic. Most of the collection has been cataloged and preserved.

== See also ==
- Brazilian Historic and Geographic Institute
- National Institute of Historic and Artistic Heritage

== Bibliography ==
- Falcão, Charles (2019). O Instituto Geográfico e Histórico do Amazonas e os itinerários da Construção de um campo intelectual em Manaus-AM [The Geographical and Historical Institute of Amazonas and the itineraries of the construction of an intellectual field in Manaus-AM] (PDF) (in Portuguese). Manaus: UFAM. Archived from the original (PDF) on 2021-08-30.
- Corrêa, Carlos; Andrade, Roberta (2021). "Entre estantes e documentos: os acervos de Manause aspossibilidades para odesenvolvimento de pesquisas histórico-educacionais" [Between shelves and documents: Manaus' collections and the possibilities for historical-educational research]. Revista Cocar. 15 (32). ISSN 2237-0315.
- Braga, Bruno; Anjos, José (2024-12-27). "Guardando memórias, construindo histórias: O Instituto Geográfico e Histórico do Amazonas – IGHA - Origens, Acervo e Balanço Histórico" [Saving memories, building stories: The Geographic and Historic Institute of Amazonas - IGHA - Origins, Collection and Historical Review]. Mneme - Revista de Humanidades. 26 (49): 1–28.
