= Geraldo Mesquita =

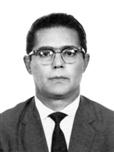
- Official portrait, 1967

Senator of Acre
- In office 1791–1975

Personal details
- Born: 7 January 1919 Feijó, Acre, Brazil
- Died: 11 September 2009 (aged 90) Brasília, Brazil
- Party: PSD
- Children: Geraldo Mesquita Júnior

Geraldo Gurgel de Mesquita (7 January 1919 - 11 September 2009), was a Brazilian accountant and politician. He was a federal deputy from 1963 to 1971, Senator 1971 to 1975 and Governor of Acre from 1975 to 1979. He was the father of politician Geraldo Mesquita Júnior.

== Biography ==
He was a professor of history at the Acre College. He was a combative journalist, secretary general and political leader in the Federal Territory. In the early sixties, he was on the front line of the autonomist struggle that led to the creation of the new Brazilian state in 1962. He held the political positions of federal deputy, senator and later of Governor of Acre from 1975 to 1979.

As governor, in the middle of the military regime, he was uncompromising in defense of extractivism, facing harsh pressures from financial groups and the military government that planned to occupy Acre with large farms.
