= Silvestre Péricles =

Brazilian politician (1896–1972)

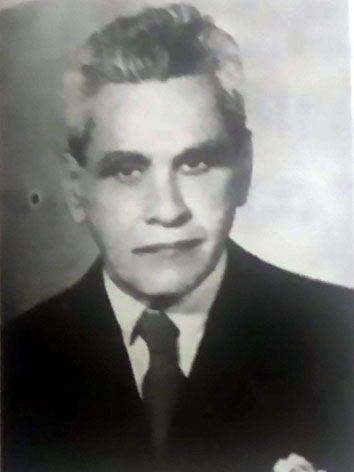

Governor of Alagoas
- In office 29 March 1947 – 31 February 1951
- Preceded by: Guedes de Miranda
- Succeeded by: Arnon de Melo

Senator for Alagoas
- In office 1 February 1959 – 1 February 1967
- Preceded by: Ezequias Rocha
- Succeeded by: Teotônio Vilela

Member of the Chamber of Deputies
- In office 5 February 1946 – 1 April 1947

Personal details
- Born: Silvestre Péricles de Góis Monteiro; March 30, 1896 São Luís do Quitunde, Alagoas, Brazil
- Died: November 16, 1972 (aged 76) Rio de Janeiro, Rio de Janeiro, Brazil
- Relations: Góis Monteiro (brother)
- Education: Federal University of Pernambuco

Silvestre Péricles de Góis Monteiro (30 March 1896 – 16 November 1972) was a Brazilian soldier and politician, whose family was in power in Alagoas during the Third Brazilian Republic.

== Early life ==
Silvestre was the son of Pedro Aureliano Monteiro dos Santos and Constança Cavalcante de Góis Monteiro. He graduated from the Federal University of Pernambuco and from the Academy of Commerce of Porto Alegre. In Rio Grande do Sul he was War Auditor in Erechim, São Gabriel, and Porto Alegre. In his home state he was editor of the Diário Oficial and police delegate in Maceió.

== Political career ==
A member of a family that emerged in politics in Alagoas after the Revolution of 1930, he was an unsuccessful candidate for the government in 1934 for the National Progressive Party, but that same year saw his party approach Getúlio Vargas and count on his benevolence. The president appointed Pedro Aurélio de Góis Monteiro to the Ministry of War and Edgar de Góis Monteiro to occupy the Palácio Marechal Floriano Peixoto.

The presence of the Góis Monteiro family in the politics of Alagoas led to the appointment of Ismar de Góis Monteiro as governor and his succession by his brother Edgar. During this, Pedro Aurélio was reinstated by Vargas in the ministry and remained in office until the government of Eurico Gaspar Dutra. After the re-democratization of the country at the end of World War II, the brothers joined the Social Democratic Party and Silvestre Péricles was elected federal deputy in 1945 and governor of Alagoas in 1947. His biography also includes a stint as minister of the Federal Audit Court.

He returned to politics in 1958, when he was elected senator for the Social Labour Party and from then on his rivalry with Arnon de Melo intensified to the point where the two engaged in gunfire in the middle of the Federal Senate: after an exchange of accusations and insults, the rivals were both attending the December 4, 1963 session when at different moments they drew their weapons in the session. Prevented from hitting Melo by the intervention of Senator João Agripino, Silvestre Péricles took cover under the bench and witnessed his enemy's retaliation, who, in an attempt to shoot him, hit and killed José Kairala, but because of his parliamentary immunity, Arnon de Melo received no punishment.

Alongside the situations described above, Silvestre Péricles migrated to the Christian Democratic Party and was defeated in the election for the government of Alagoas in 1960. In 1962 he lost the election for federal deputy even though he had half his mandate as senator to serve. After a stint in the Brazilian Labor Party he joined the Brazilian Democratic Movement after the victory of the military regime in 1964, and in 1970 lost the election for federal deputy. After him, the city of São Luís do Quitunde still achieved two state governors: Lamenha Filho and Divaldo Suruagy.

== Sources ==
- Ratatatatatá. Available in Veja, ed. 98, July 22, 1970. São Paulo: April. Silvestre Péricles (1896-1972). Available in Veja, ed. 220, November 22, 1972. São Paulo: April.
