= São Luís do Quitunde =

Municipality of Alagoas, Brazil

- Municipality of Alagoas, Brazil
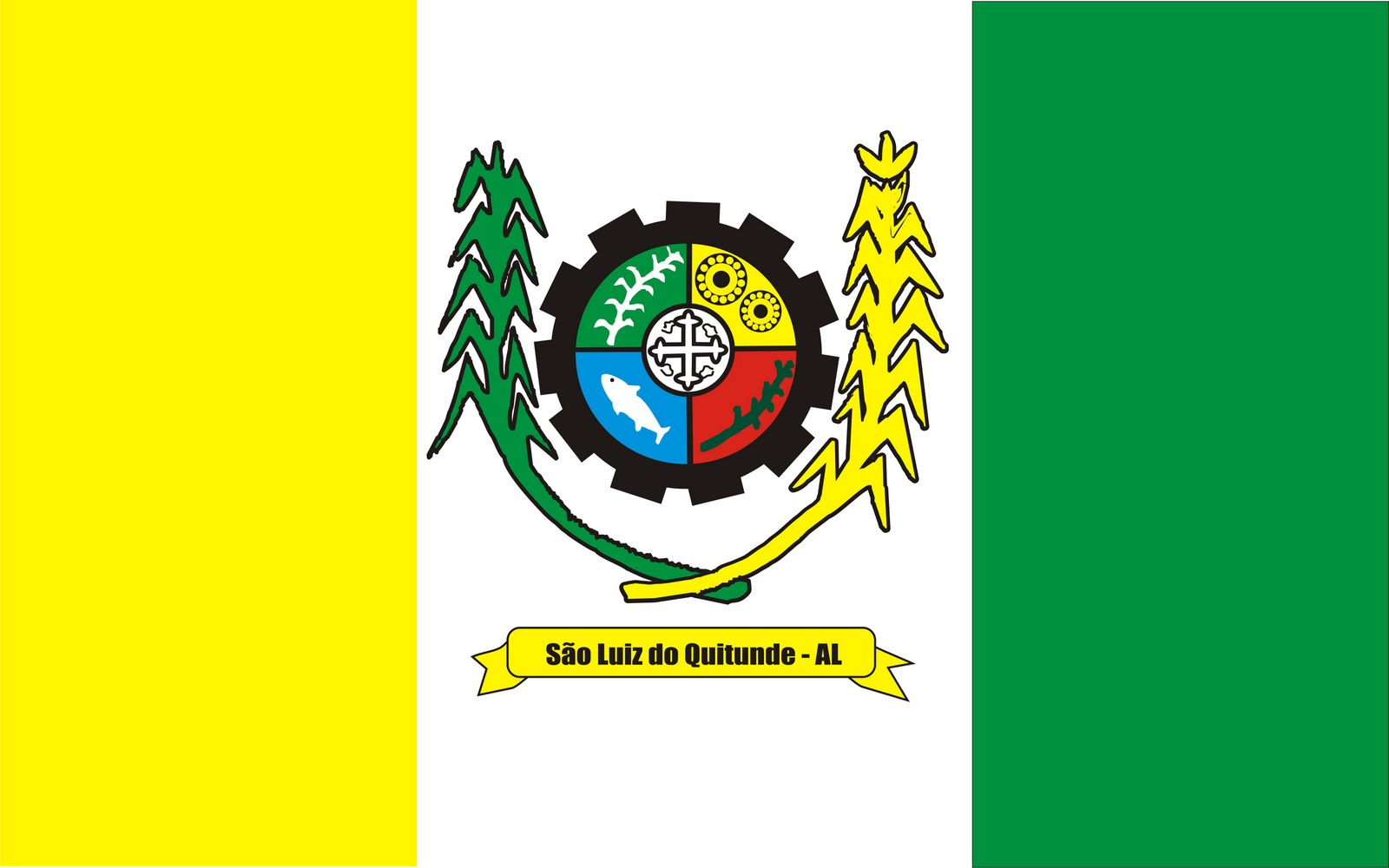
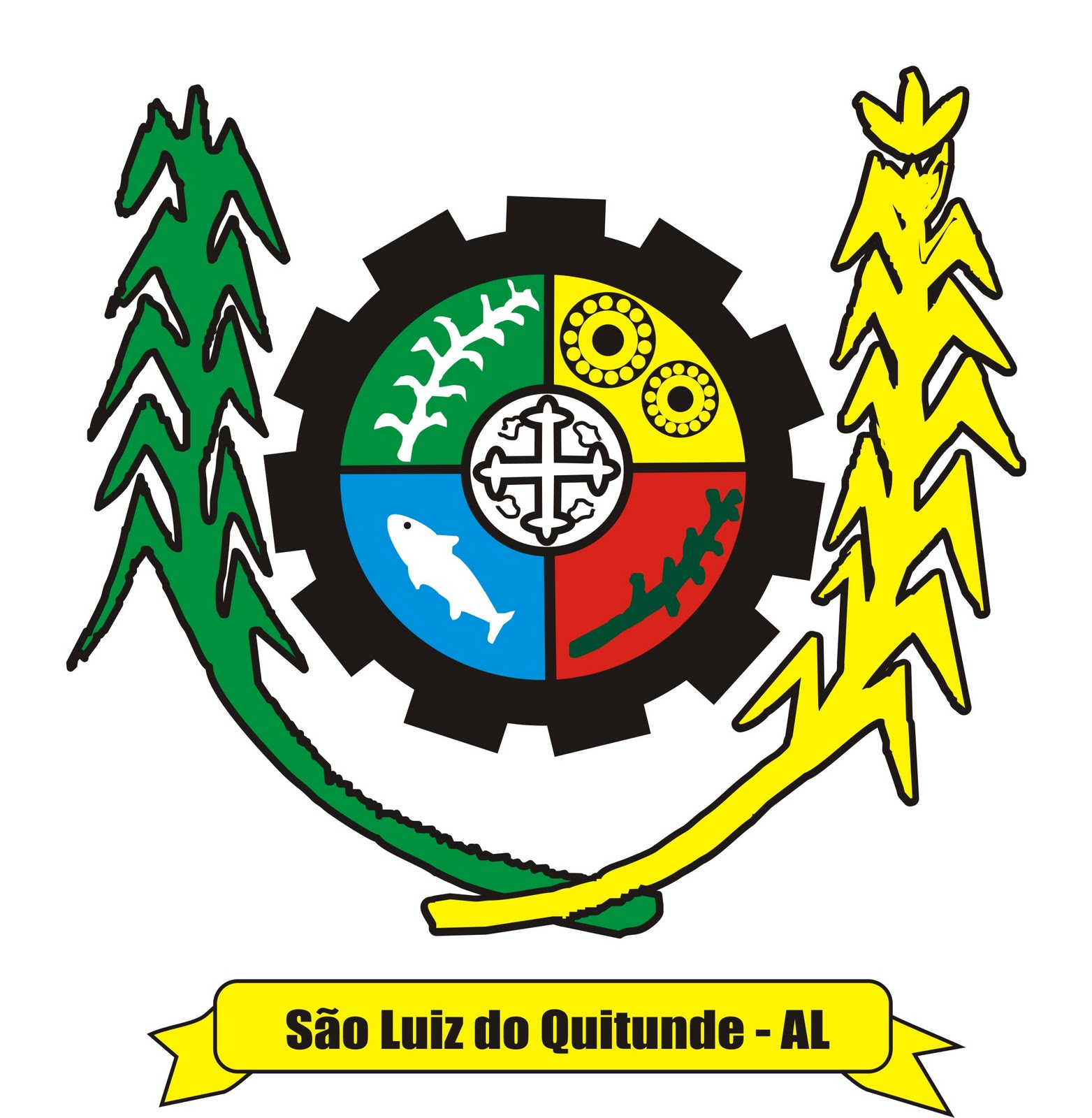
- Flag Coat of arms

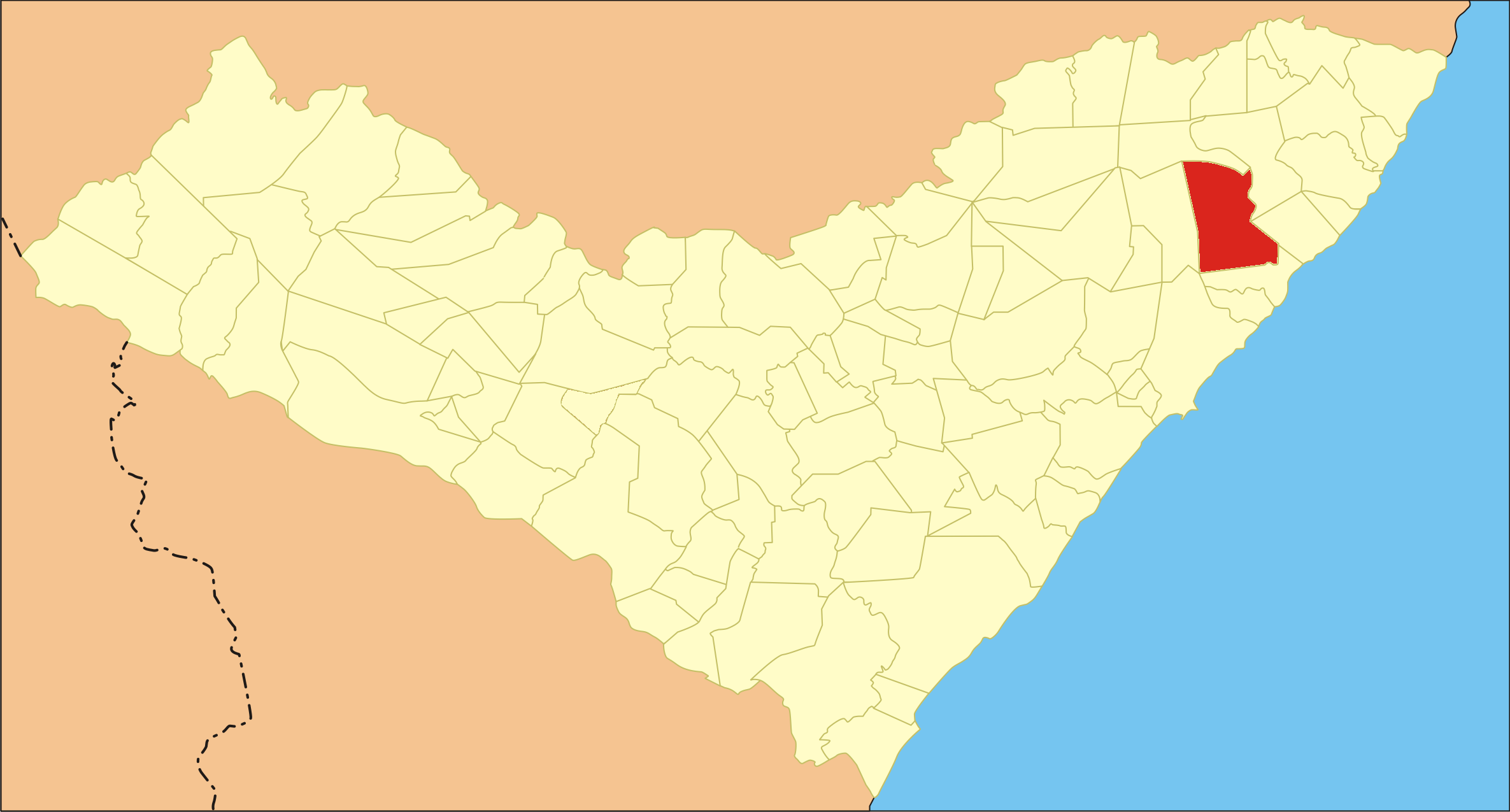
- Location of São Luís do Quitunde in Alagoas

- Location within Brazil Location within South America
- Coordinates: 9°19′4″S 35°33′39″W
- Country: Brazil
- Region: Northeast
- State: Alagoas
- Founded: 16 May 1892

Government
  - Mayor: Marcia Rafaela Barros de Vasconcelos (MDB) (2025-2028)
  - Vice Mayor: Cristophanes Jacques Uchoa de Lima (MDB) (2025-2028)

Area
  - Total: 397.257 km^{2} (153.382 sq mi)
- Elevation: 4 m (13 ft)

Population (2022)
  - Total: 30,873
  - Density: 77.72/km^{2} (201.3/sq mi)
- Demonym: Quitundense (Brazilian Portuguese)
- Time zone: UTC-03:00 (Brasília Time)
- Postal code: 57920-000
- HDI (2010): 0.536 – low
- Website: saoluisdoquitunde.al.gov.br

São Luís do Quitunde (Central northeastern portuguese pronunciation: [ˈsɐ̃w luˈis ˈdʊ kitũˈdi]) is a municipality located in the western of the Brazilian state of Alagoas. Its population was 34,692 (2020) and its area is 404 km^{2} (156 sq mi).

== See also ==
- List of municipalities in Alagoas
