= José Kairala =

Brazilian politician (1924–1963)

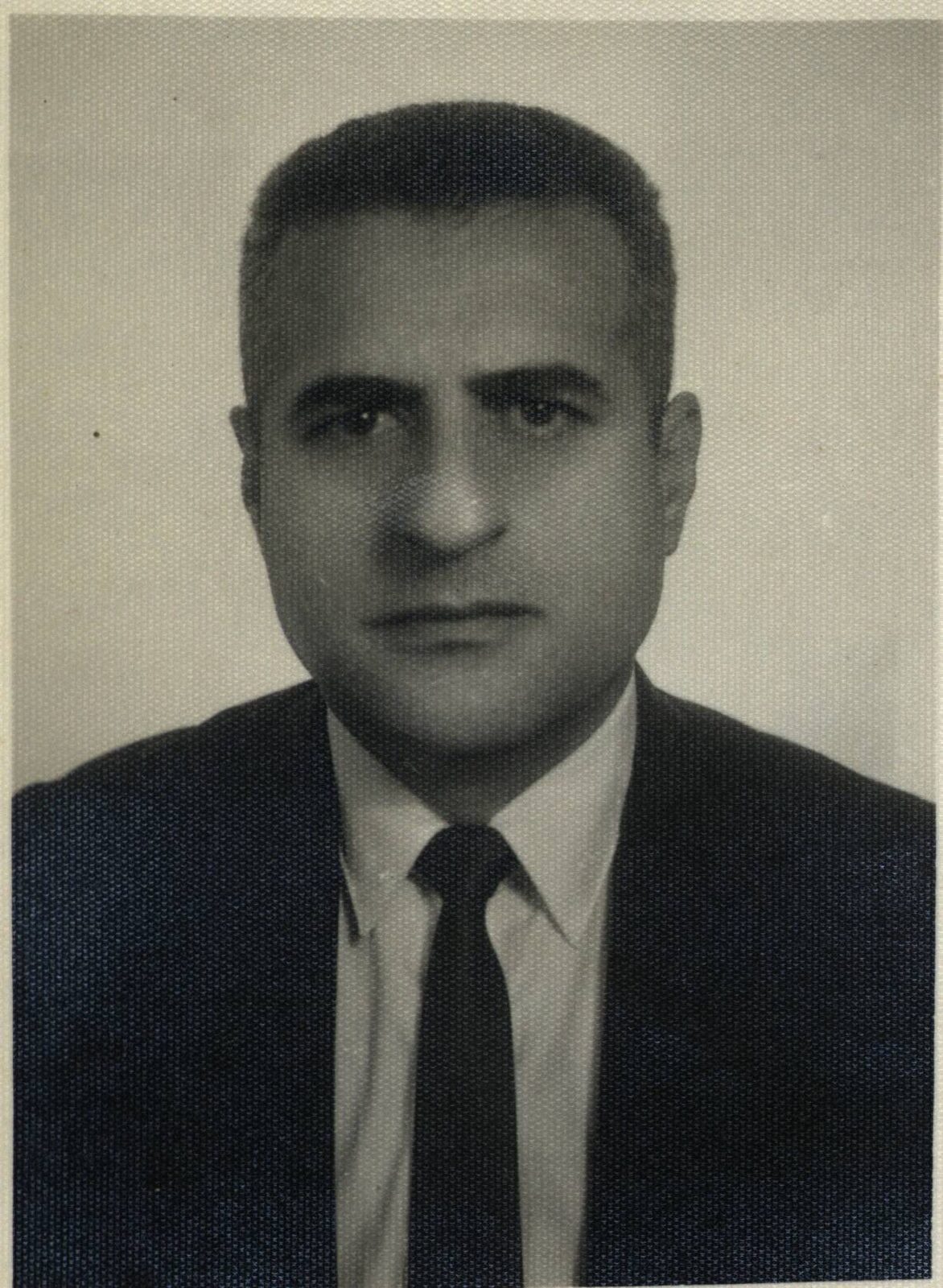

Senator for Acre
- In office 6 July 1963 – 4 December 1963
- Preceded by: José Guiomard
- Succeeded by: José Guiomard

Personal details
- Born: Kairala José Kairala; 1 February 1924 Manaus, Brazil
- Died: 4 December 1963 (aged 39) Brasília, Brazil
- Party: PSD
- Spouse: Creusa da Silva

Kairala José Kairala (1 February 1924 – 4 December 1963) was a Brazilian politician who briefly served as a senator from the state of Acre in 1963. He served as a substitute for senator José Guiomard. He was killed at his last session as senator by fellow senator Arnon de Melo, who intended to shoot another senator, Silvestre Péricles, purportedly in self-defense as Péricles was allegedly drawing his own gun.

== Biography ==
Kairala was born in Manaus, the son of José Kairala Sfair and Carolina Moussuly Kairala, who were of Lebanese background. After working as a merchant, he became a member of the PSD and was elected in 1962 as a substitute senator as part of Guiomard's ticket. He assumed the position in 1963 after Guiomard began to experience health issues.

He was attending his last session as senator on 4 December 1963 with his family. Melo, who was the father of future president Fernando Collor de Mello, was present at the chamber to refute accusations made by his political rival Péricles. The two came from politically prominent families in the state of Alagoas, and thus grew to resent each other. Both began carrying firearms as these tensions between the two rivals escalated. Péricles then entered the plenary and began to interrupt Melo and shout verbal transgressions at him. After beginning to move towards Melo, Melo drew his gun and shot at Péricles. Péricles drew his gun as well, but his arm was pushed down by colleague João Agripino. These shots unintentionally hit Kairala, who was sitting in the first row and who had attempted to break up the fight, in the abdomen. He was rushed to a hospital in Brasília, but died shortly after the incident. The president of the chamber, Auro de Moura Andrade, called off the session for the time being due to the incident.

Though both the senators were arrested in flagrante delicto and had multiple witnesses on the chamber floor, they spent very little time in prison and were eventually acquitted by a jury in Brasília. Melo in fact was able to serve out the rest of his term in Senate without much penalty. The jury considered the two as having acted in legitimate self-defense, ruling Kairala's death an accident.

After his death, his family returned to Acre and moved afterwards to Minas Gerais. His widow, Creusa da Silva, and their family eventually to the Federal District in 1977, with her working as a laundrywoman and nanny. She attempted to force Melo to pay for their son's school expenses, but without success.
