= Arnon de Melo =

Brazilian politician (1911–1983)

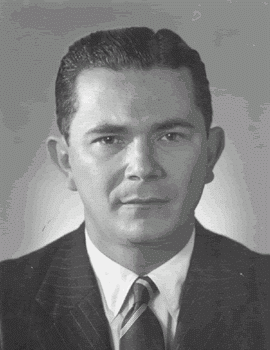

Senator for Alagoas
- In office 1 February 1963 – 6 August 1981

Governor of Alagoas
- In office 31 January 1951 – 31 January 1956
- Vice Governor: Guedes de Miranda
- Preceded by: Silvestre Péricles
- Succeeded by: Muniz Falcão

Personal details
- Born: Arnon Afonso de Farias Melo; 19 September 1911 Rio Largo, Alagoas, Brazil
- Died: 29 September 1983 (aged 72) Maceió, Alagoas, Brazil
- Party: UDN (1945–1956); PDC (1956–1965); ARENA (1966–1979); PDS (1980–1983)
- Children: 5, including Fernando and Pedro
- Education: Federal University of Rio de Janeiro

Arnon Afonso de Farias Melo (19 September 1911 — 29 September 1983) was a Brazilian journalist, lawyer, politician and businessperson. He is the father of the ex-president of Brazil Fernando Collor de Mello.

== Biography ==
He was the son of Manuel Afonso de Melo and Lúcia de Farias Melo.

He studied in Maceió until he moved to Rio de Janeiro in 1930, where he worked as a journalist at A Vanguarda, a newspaper closed down by the Revolution of 1930. A lawyer who graduated from the National Law School of the Federal University of Rio de Janeiro in 1933, he worked for the Diário de Notícias and the Diários Associados before graduating. After graduating he worked for the Commercial Association of Rio de Janeiro and also for the Diário Carioca and O Jornal. In 1936 he took over the direction of the Gazeta de Alagoas and was a member of the board of directors of the Brazilian Press Association.

== Political career ==
After the end of the Third Brazilian Republic, he joined the National Democratic Union and was elected federal deputy in 1945.

With the same party he was simultaneously elected federal deputy and governor of Alagoas in 1950, opting for the latter position where he served a five-year term.

He returned to political life through the Christian Democratic Party and was elected senator in 1962, joining the National Renewal Alliance after the military regime of 1964 declared a two-party system. Reelected by direct vote in 1970, he was reelected as an alternate senator in 1978. When he died he was again affiliated to the Christian Democratic Party, which he had rejoined in 1980. After his death, the seat was occupied by Carlos Lyra.

== Homicide at the Brazilian Senate ==
Elected senator in the 1962 general elections, Arnon de Mello received death threats from fellow senator Silvestre Pericles. The hostility between the two politicians dated back to 1950, when Arnon defeated Silvestre's candidate, then governor, in the succession for the government of Alagoas. At the time, Arnon de Mello had the support of Ismar Góis Monteiro, one of Silvestre Péricles' brothers. On December 4, 1963, both senators arrived at the Senate with guns. While making a speech at the rostrum of the upper chamber, Arnon noticed Silvestre's movement, indicating that he would draw his gun. Anticipating Silvestre, Arnon fired three shots. None of the shots hit Silvestre; Arnon mistakenly fired a shot into the chest of Senator José Kairala, from Acre, who died on his last day of work.

Soon after the shooting, both senators were arrested. Pericles was released shortly afterwards; Arnon remained in prison for seven months, but was acquitted by the Supreme Federal Court in July 1964. The courts held that the senator had acted in self-defense. Mrs. Creusa Kairala, the victim's widow, sued Arnon de Mello, demanding that he pay for the education of the couple's four children. According to press records, however, all Mrs. Creusa got was a pension.

After this episode, the two senators were reappointed. Arnon de Mello was reelected senator twice.

== Death ==
Suffering from progressive supranuclear palsy, Arnon de Mello died at age 72, on September 29, 1983, in Maceió.
