= 2022 Alagoas general election =

State election in Alagoas, Brazil in 2022

2022 Alagoas state election
- 2 October 2022 (first round); 30 October 2022 (second round)
- Registered: 2,302,905
- Turnout: 77.61% (first round); 76.73% (second round)
- Gubernatorial election
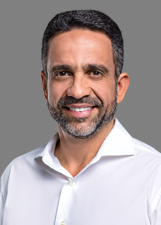

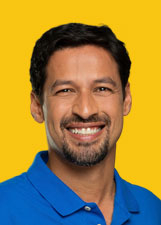
Candidate	Paulo Dantas	Rodrigo Cunha
Party	MDB	Union Brazil
Home state	Maceió, Alagoas	Arapiraca, Alagoas
Running mate	Ronaldo Lessa (PDT)	Jó Pereira (PSDB)
Popular vote	834,278	759,984
Percentage	52.33%	47.67%
- Candidate with the most votes per municipality in the 2nd round (102): Paulo Dantas: 50%–59% (21); Paulo Dantas: 60%–69% (26); Paulo Dantas: 70%–79% (26); Paulo Dantas: 80%–89% (8); Paulo Dantas: 90%–100% (Pariconha); Rodrigo Cunha: 50%–59% (13); Rodrigo Cunha: 60%–69% (7)
Governor before election
Paulo Dantas
MDB
Elected Governor
Paulo Dantas
MDB

2022 Alagoas senatorial election
- 2 October 2022
- Registered: 2,302,905
- Turnout: 77.61%
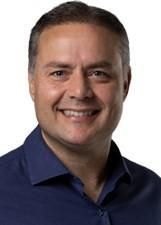

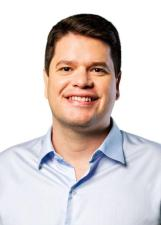

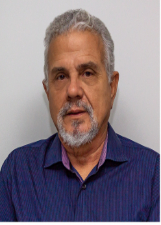
	Majority party	Minority party	Third party
Candidate	Renan Filho	Davi Davino Filho	Mario Agra
Party	MDB	PP	PSOL
Popular vote	845,988	627,397	12,768
Percentage	56.92%	42.22%	0.86%
Senator before election
Fernando Collor de Mello
PTB
Elected Senator
Renan Filho
MDB

The 2022 Alagoas state elections were held on October 2 (first round, for all positions) and October 30 (second round, for governor), as part of the general elections in Brazil. Eligible voters elected the governor and vice governor of the state and one senator with two alternates, as well as nine federal deputies and 27 state deputies. Those elected took office on January 1 (governor and vice governor) or February 1 (senator and deputies) 2023 for four-year terms (except in the case of the senator, who will serve an eight-year term).

The governor and deputy governors elected in this election will serve a slightly longer term. This is due to Constitutional Amendment No. 111, which amended the Constitution and stipulated that the term of office for state governors and the Federal District governor shall begin on January 6 after the election. However, the candidates elected in this election will take office on January 1, 2023, and leave office on January 6, 2027.

The current governor of the state is Paulo Dantas, indirectly elected by the Legislative Assembly of Alagoas for a temporary term ending on May 15, 2022. The position became vacant after Renan Filho resigned to run for the Federal Senate and the state had no deputy governor, since Luciano Barbosa had resigned to take office as mayor of Arapiraca in 2021. In addition, the president of the Legislative Assembly, Marcelo Victor, who should have assumed the line of succession, abstained because assuming the executive office would prevent him from being re-elected as a representative in the 2022 elections. Klever Loureiro, president of the Court of Justice of Alagoas, took office as interim governor between Renan Filho's resignation and the indirect election of Paulo Dantas.

For the Federal Senate election, the seat held by Fernando Collor de Mello, of the Brazilian Labour Party (PTB), who was re-elected in 2014, was up for grabs.

== Electoral calendar ==
The information was released by the Regional Electoral Court of Alagoas (TRE-AL):

Electoral calendar
May 15	Start of crowdfunding for pre-candidates
July 20 to August 5	Party conventions for the selection of candidates and coalitions
October 2	First round of elections
October 7 to 28	Free electoral advertising on radio and television for a possible second round
October 30	Possible second round of elections
December 16	Certification of the elected by the Electoral Court

== Candidates for governor of Alagoas ==
=== Confirmed applications ===
Party conventions began on July 20 and continued until August 5. The following political parties confirmed their candidates. Political parties had until August 15, 2022, to formally register their candidates.

Candidates for Governor of Alagoas
Image	Governor		Previous Political Office	Vice-Governor		Coalition/ Federation	Electoral Number	Broadcast Time
	Candidate	Party	Previous Political Office	Candidate	Party	Coalition/ Federation	Electoral Number	Broadcast Time
	Bombeiro Luciano Fontes	PMB	No prior political office	Rogers Tenório	PMB	No coalition	35	No radio or TV time
	Fernando Collor	PTB	Senator from Alagoas (2007–2023)	Leonardo Dias	PL	Green and Yellow Alagoas; PTB, PL, Act	14	1min
	Luciano Almeida	PRTB	No prior political office	Sargento Walderlan	PRTB	Alagoas Moves Forward; PRTB, PROS	28	19s
	Paulo Dantas	MDB	Governor of Alagoas (2022–present)	Ronaldo Lessa	PDT	Alagoas for the Better; MDB, PDT, PSC, FE Brasil (PT, PCdoB, PV), Solidarity	15	2min 52s
	Professor Cicero Albuquerque	PSOL	No prior political office	Eliane Silva	PSOL	Fed. PSOL REDE	50	22s
	Rodrigo Cunha	UNIÃO	Senator from Alagoas (2019–present)	Jó Pereira	PSDB	Alagoas Deserves More; UNIÃO, Fed. PSDB Citizenship, PP, PODE, PSB	44	3min 49s
	Rui Palmeira	PSD	Mayor of Maceió (2013–2020)	Arthur Albuquerque	Republicanos	Forward Alagoas; PSD, Republicanos, Patriota	55	1min 35s

== Candidates for the Federal Senate ==
Party conventions began on July 20 and will continue until August 5. The following political parties have already confirmed their candidates. Political parties had until August 15, 2022, to formally register their candidates.

Note: The following table is organized alphabetically by candidates, according to the name registered with the Electoral Court.

Candidates for Senator of Alagoas
Image	Senator		Previous Political Office	Alternates		Coalition/ Federation	Electoral Number	Broadcast Time
Image	Candidate	Party	Previous Political Office	Candidate	Party	Coalition/ Federation	Electoral Number	Broadcast Time
	Bombeira Suzana Souza	PMB	No prior political office	1st Alternate: Eudes Emidio	PMB	No coalition	350	No radio or TV time
	Bombeira Suzana Souza	PMB	No prior political office	2nd Alternate: Floripes Orestes	PMB	No coalition	350	No radio or TV time
	Coronel do Valle	PROS	No prior political office	1st Alternate: Janaína Lins	PROS	Alagoas Moves Forward PRTB, PROS	900	13s
	Coronel do Valle	PROS	No prior political office	2nd Alternate: Maria Do Valle	PROS	Alagoas Moves Forward PRTB, PROS	900	13s
	Davi Davino Filho	PP	State Deputy from Alagoas (2015–present)	1st Alternate: Gilda Caldas	PP	Alagoas Deserves More UNIÃO, Fed. PSDB Citizenship, PP, PODE, PSB	111	1min 56s
	Davi Davino Filho	PP	State Deputy from Alagoas (2015–present)	2nd Alternate: Gunnar Nicácio	UNIÃO	Alagoas Deserves More UNIÃO, Fed. PSDB Citizenship, PP, PODE, PSB	111	1min 56s
	Mário Agra	PSOL	No prior political office	1st Alternate: Junior	PSOL	Fed. PSOL REDE	500	15s
	Mário Agra	PSOL	No prior political office	2nd Alternate: Elizabete Rai	PSOL	Fed. PSOL REDE	500	15s
	Renan Filho	MDB	Governor of Alagoas (2015–2022)	1st Alternate: Fernando Farias	MDB	Alagoas for the Better MDB, PDT, PSC, FE Brasil (PT, PCdoB, PV), Solidarity	151	2min 56s
	Renan Filho	MDB	Governor of Alagoas (2015–2022)	2nd Alternate: Adélia Maria	PV	Alagoas for the Better MDB, PDT, PSC, FE Brasil (PT, PCdoB, PV), Solidarity	151	2min 56s

== Debates ==
The following table lists the debates held among the candidates. Attendance is marked as "Present," "Invited," or "Absent."

Date	Organizer	Moderator	Collor (PTB)	Almeida (PRTB)	Cunha (UNIÃO)	Dantas (MDB)	Albuquerque (PSOL)	Palmeira (PSD)
August 30, 2022	Portal 7Segundos	Luciano Amorim	Present	Present	Present	Present	Present	Present
September 5, 2022	TV Mar	Wyderlan Araújo	Present	Present	Invited	Invited	Present	Present
September 24, 2022	TV Pajuçara	Mariana Godoy	Present	Present	Present	Present	Present	Present
September 27, 2022	TV Gazeta de Alagoas	Fabio Turci	Present	Present	Present	Present	Present	Present
September 29, 2022	TV Ponta Verde	Darlisson Dutra	Absent	Present	Present	Absent	Present	Present

== Opinion polls ==
=== Governor ===
==== First round ====
The following table lists opinion polls conducted for the first round of the 2022 Alagoas gubernatorial election. Results are shown for each candidate, with "Abstentions/Undecided" and "Others" as separate columns. The "Margin" column indicates the lead of the first-placed candidate over the second-placed candidate.

Pollster	Dates conducted	Sample size	Dantas MDB	Collor PTB	Cunha UNIÃO	Palmeira PSD	Albuquerque PSOL	Others	Abstentions/ Undecided	Margin
Ipec	September 28–30, 2022	800	41%	12%	21%	14%	1%	1% (Note: Luciano Almeida (PRTB) and Luciano Fontes (PMB) with 1% each.)	10%	20%
Fundepes	September 23–26, 2022	1,311	38.7%	14.6%	17.7%	8.9%	1.3%	—N/a	18.4%	21%
Ibrape/Cadaminuto	September 21–24, 2022	1,992	38%	13%	24%	9%	—N/a	—N/a	16%	14%
Instituto DataSensus	September 21–22, 2022	5,109	37%	13%	21%	10%	—N/a	2% (Note: Other candidates combined for 2%.)	17%	16%
Ipec	September 16–18, 2022	800	30%	20%	20%	11%	1%	1% (Note: Luciano Almeida (PRTB) with 1%; Luciano Fontes (PMB) did not score in the poll.)	17%	10%
Ibrape/Cadaminuto	September 11–14, 2022	1,992	36%	17%	20%	9%	—N/a	—N/a	18%	16%
Paraná Pesquisas	September 10–14, 2022	1,510	30%	18.9%	20.8%	12%	1.7%	1.7% (Note: Luciano Almeida (PRTB) with 1%; Luciano Fontes (PMB) with 0.7% each.)	14.9%	9.2%
Result	September 7–11, 2022	1,067	23.1%	15.5%	16.2%	17.2%	0.8%	—N/a	27.2%	5.9%
Instituto DataSensus	September 9–10, 2022	5,062	33%	15%	21%	10%	1%	1% (Note: Other candidates combined for 1%.)	19%	12%
Ibrape/Cadaminuto	September 2–5, 2022	1,992	35%	19%	19%	8%	—N/a	—N/a	19%	16%
Ipec	August 29–31, 2022	800	24%	17%	21%	15%	1%	2% (Note: Luciano Almeida (PRTB) and Luciano Fontes (PMB) with 1% each.)	21%	3%
Instituto DataSensus	August 26–28, 2022	5,040	29.5%	18.7%	17.8%	10.1%	1%	1% (Note: Other candidates combined for 1%.)	21.8%	10.8%
Ibrape/Cadaminuto	August 21–25, 2022	1,992	34%	24%	14%	7%	—N/a	—N/a	21%	10%
Fundepes	August 21–23, 2022	1,311	34.5%	22.98%	13.53%	7.56%	—N/a	—N/a	21.39%	11.52%
Paraná Pesquisas	August 11–15, 2022	1,510	25.1%	22.6%	18.1%	13.6%	1.6%	1.4% (Note: Luciano Almeida (PRTB) with 0.9%; Luciano Fontes (PMB) with 0.5%.)	17.7%	2.5%
Instituto DataSensus	August 12–13, 2022	5,072	28%	19%	14.6%	10%	1.2%	—N/a	25.2%	9%
Fundepes	August 1–5, 2022	1,311	29.9%	20.3%	13.5%	7.2%	—N/a	—N/a	30%	9.6%
Instituto DataSensus	July 29–30, 2022	5,032	30.7%	18.6%	15.5%	12%	1.5%	—N/a	21.7%	12.1%

=== Senate ===
The following table lists opinion polls conducted for the 2022 Alagoas Senate election. Results are shown for each candidate, with "Abstentions/Undecided" as a separate column. The "Margin" column indicates the lead of the first-placed candidate over the second-placed candidate.

Pollster	Dates conducted	Sample size	Renan MDB	Davino PP	Valle PROS	Agra PSOL	Souza PMB	Abstentions/ Undecided	Margin
Ipec	September 28–30, 2022	800	57%	25%	3%	1%	2%	12%	32%
Fundepes	September 23–26, 2022	1,311	48.3%	23.9%	2.3%	—N/a	—N/a	25.2%	24.4%
Ibrape/Cadaminuto	September 21–24, 2022	1,992	56%	26%	1%	—N/a	—N/a	17%	30%
Instituto DataSensus	September 21–22, 2022	5,109	51%	24%	2%	1%	4%	18%	27%
Ipec	September 16–18, 2022	800	59%	21%	3%	1%	2%	15%	38%
Ibrape/Cadaminuto	September 11–14, 2022	1,992	55%	24%	2%	1%	0%	20%	31%
Paraná Pesquisas	September 10–14, 2022	1,510	50.3%	24%	4.2%	0.7%	1.5%	19.3%	26.3%
Instituto DataSensus	September 9–10, 2022	5,062	50.3%	21.4%	2.6%	0.9%	3.5%	21.3%	28.9%
Ibrape/Cadaminuto	September 2–5, 2022	1,992	57%	20%	2%	1%	1%	20%	37%
Ipec	August 29–31, 2022	800	56%	17%	4%	1%	1%	21%	39%
Instituto DataSensus	August 26–28, 2022	5,040	51.8%	16.2%	2.8%	1%	5.9%	22.3%	35.6%
Ibrape/Cadaminuto	August 21–25, 2022	1,992	57%	20%	2%	2%	2%	18%	37%
Fundepes	August 21–23, 2022	1,311	56.61%	19.37%	4.35%	—N/a	—N/a	16.52%	37.24%
Paraná Pesquisas	August 11–15, 2022	1,510	50.5%	23.6%	1.6%	1.1%	2.2%	18.9%	26.9%
Instituto DataSensus	August 12–13, 2022	5,072	52.4%	13.7%	3.4%	1.4%	—N/a	26.7%	38.7%
Fundepes	August 1–5, 2022	1,311	56.25%	18.5%	—N/a	1.91%	—N/a	23.35%	37.75%
Instituto DataSensus	July 29–30, 2022	5,032	56.8%	18.5%	—N/a	2.6%	—N/a	22.1%	38.3%

== Results ==
=== Governor ===
2022 Alagoas gubernatorial election
Candidate		First round October 2, 2022		Second round October 30, 2022	
Candidate		Votes	%	Votes	%
Paulo Dantas (MDB)	Ronaldo Lessa (PDT)	708,984	46.64%	834,278	52.33%
Rodrigo Cunha (UNIÃO)	Jó Pereira (PSDB)	407,220	26.79%	759,984	47.67%
Fernando Collor (PTB)	Leonardo Dias (PL)	223,585	14.71%	Did not advance	
Rui Palmeira (PSD)	Arthur Albuquerque (Republicanos)	157,746	10.38%	Did not advance	
Cícero Albuquerque (PSOL)	Eliane Silva (PSOL)	17,749	1.17%	Did not advance	
Luciano Fontes (PMB)	Rogers Tenório (PMB)	2,737	0.18%	Did not advance	
Luciano Almeida (PRTB)	Sargento Walderlan (PRTB)	2,110	0.14%	Did not advance	
Valid votes		1,520,131	84.32%	1,594,262	89.44%
Blank votes		88,769	4.92%	47,668	2.68%
Annulled votes		0	0%	140,477	7.88%
Total votes		1,802,791	77.61%	1,812,136	77.15%
Abstentions		520,114	22.39%	536,693	22.85%
Registered voters		2,322,905		2,348,829	

Popular vote (first round)
Dantas (MDB)	46.64%
Cunha (UNIÃO)	26.79%
Collor (PTB)	14.71%
Palmeira (PSD)	10.38%
Albuquerque (PSOL)	1.17%
Fontes (PMB)	0.18%
Almeida (PRTB)	0.14%

Popular vote (second round)
Dantas (MDB)	52.33%
Cunha (UNIÃO)	47.67%

=== Senate ===
Suzana Souza's (PMB) candidacy was rejected by the TRE-AL.

2022 Alagoas senatorial election
Candidate		Single round October 2, 2022	
Candidate		Votes	%
Renan Filho (MDB)	845,988	56.92%	
Davi Davino Filho (PP)	627,397	42.22%	
Mário Agra (PSOL)	12,768	0.86%	
Valid votes		1,486,153	82.44%
Blank votes		115,519	6.40%
Invalid votes		201,119	11.16%
Annulled votes		0	0.00%
Total votes		1,802,791	77.61%
Abstentions		520,114	22.39%
Registered voters		2,302,905	

Popular vote
Renan (MDB)	56.92%
Davino (PP)	42.22%
Agra (PSOL)	0.86%

== Federal deputies ==
These are the nine federal deputies elected by the state of Alagoas:

Elected representation
PP: 4
MDB: 2
FE Brasil: 2
UNIÃO: 1

Elected federal deputies from Alagoas, 2022
Candidate	%	Votes	Hometown
Arthur Lira (PP)	13.26%	219,452	Maceió, Alagoas
Alfredo Gaspar (UNIÃO)	6.17%	102,039	Maceió, Alagoas
Luciano Amaral (PV)	6.13%	101,508	Maceió, Alagoas
Marx Beltrão (PP)	5.35%	88,512	Maceió, Alagoas
Isnaldo Bulhões (MDB)	5.07%	83,965	Maceió, Alagoas
Paulão do PT (PT)	3.98%	65,814	Recife, Pernambuco
Daniel Barbosa (PP)	3.83%	63,385	Maceió, Alagoas
Delegado Fábio Costa(PP)	3.67%	60,767	Recife, Pernambuco
Rafael Brito (MDB)	3.51%	58,134	Maceió, Alagoas

== States deputies ==
These are the twenty-seven representatives elected to take up a seat in the Legislative Assembly of Alagoas. Of the twenty-seven parliamentarians elected, only five were women.

Elected representation
MDB: 14
PP: 4
UNIÃO: 3
FE Brasil: 2
Republicans: 2
PL: 1
Avante: 1

Elected state deputies from Alagoas, 2022
Candidate	Party	Votes
Alexandre Ayres	MDB	61,142
Cabo Bebeto	PL	51,721
Marcelo Victor	MDB	51,259
Flávia Cavalcante	MDB	50,902
Cibele Moura	MDB	46,120
Fernando Pereira	PP	45,509
Carla Dantas	MDB	44,477
Ricardo Nezinho	MDB	43,797
Dr. Wanderley	MDB	43,512
Antonio Albuquerque	Republicans	41,748
Fátima Canuto	MDB	41,319
Remi Calheiros	MDB	39,947
Bruno Toledo	MDB	38,070
Delegado Leonam	UNIÃO	37,805
Ronaldo Medeiros	PT	35,883
Dudu Ronalsa	MDB	35,792
Rose Davino	PP	34,343
Inácio Loiola	MDB	33,270
Francisco Tenório	PP	32,644
Breno Albuquerque	MDB	32,159
Gilvan Filho	MDB	32,035
Lelo Maia	UNIÃO	31,706
Andre Silva	Republicans	31,036
Gabi Gonçalves	PP	29,336
Mesaque Padilha	UNIÃO	29,102
Marcos Barbosa	Avante	20,761
Silvio Camelo	PV	19,714
