= List of governors of Alagoas =

This is a list of governors of Alagoas.

== Rulers of the colonial period (1817 — 1822) ==
The captaincy of Alagoas was created on September 16, 1817, splitting off from the captaincy of Pernambuco, whose governor commanded it until 1819. On February 28, 1821, all captaincies in Brazil were renamed "provinces".

| Nº | Name | Image | Start of Term | End of Term | Comments | References and Notes |
|---|---|---|---|---|---|---|
| — | José Inácio Borges | | September 16, 1817 | January 22, 1819 | As governor of the Captaincy of Pernambuco | |
| 1 | Sebastião Francisco de Melo e Póvoas | | January 22, 1819 | January 31, 1822 | | |
| 2 | José António Ferreira Brak-Lamy | | January 31, 1822 | June 28, 1822 | Last governor under Portuguese rule | |
| 3 | Caetano Maria Lopes Gama | | June 28, 1822 | October 1, 1822 | President of the governing board of the province of Alagoas | |

== Rulers of the Imperial Period (1822 - 1889) ==
Legend

- Conservative Party
- Liberal Party
- Democratic party
- People's Party
- Moderate Party

| Number | Name | Image | Party | Start of Term | End of Term | Comments |
|---|---|---|---|---|---|---|
First Reign (1822–1831)
| 1 | Caetano Maria Lopes Gama | | People's Party | June 28, 1822 | October 1, 1822 | Viscount of Maranguape President of the governing board of Alagoas |
| 2 | José Fernandes Bulhões | | People's Party | October 1, 1822 | November 12, 1822 | President of the governing board of Alagoas |
| 3 | Lourenço Accioly Canavarro | | People's Party | November 12, 1822 | January 1, 1824 | President of the governing board of Alagoas |
| 4 | Francisco de Assis Barbosa | | Democratic Party | January 1, 1824 | July 1, 1824 | President of the governing board of Alagoas |
| 5 | Eugênio Lóssio Seiblitz | | People's Party | July 1, 1824 | February 14, 1828 | Provincial President appointed by Imperial Charter |
| 6 | Cândido José de Araújo Viana | | People's Party | February 14, 1828 | January 1, 1829 | Marquis of Sapucai |
| 7 | Manuel Antônio Galvão | | Moderate Party | January 1, 1829 | April 4, 1830 | Judge |
| 8 | Caetano Montenegro Filho | | People's Party | April 4, 1830 | May 19, 1831 | Viscount of Vila Real da Praia Grande |
Regency period (1831–1840)
| 9 | Manuel de Miranda Henriques | | Conservative Party | May 19, 1831 | November 16, 1832 | Provincial President appointed by Imperial Charter |
| 10 | Antônio Chichorro da Gama | | Liberal Party | November 16, 1832 | September 2, 1833 | Provincial President appointed by Imperial Charter |
| 11 | Vicente Figueiredo de Camargo | | Liberal Party | September 2, 1833 | December 14, 1834 | Provincial President appointed by Imperial Charter |
| 12 | José Joaquim Machado | | Conservative Party | December 14, 1834 | May 15, 1835 | Provincial President appointed by Imperial Charter |
| 13 | Antônio Joaquim de Moura | | Liberal Party | May 15, 1835 | August 23, 1836 | Provincial President appointed by Imperial Charter |
| 14 | Rodrigo de Sousa Pontes | | Conservative Party | August 23, 1836 | de April 18, 1838 | Provincial President appointed by Imperial Charter |
| — | Agostinho da Silva Neves | | Conservative Party | April 18, 1838 | October 29, 1838 | |
| — | José Tavares Bastos | semmoldura | Conservative Party | October 29, 1838 | October 30, 1838 | |
| 15 | João de Sinimbu | | Liberal Party | October 30, 1838 | November 3, 1838 | Viscount of Sinimbu |
| 16 | Agostinho da Silva Neves | | Conservative Party | November 3, 1838 | January 10, 1840 | Provincial President appointed by Imperial Charter |
| 17 | João de Sinimbu | | Liberal Party | January 10, 1840 | July 18, 1840 | Viscount of Sinimbu |
Second reign (1840–1889)
| 18 | Manuel Felizardo de Mello | semmoldura | Conservative Party | July 18, 1840 | December 27, 1842 | Provincial President appointed by Imperial Charter |
| — | Caetano Silvestre da Silva | | Conservative Party | December 27, 1842 | March 1, 1843 | |
| 19 | Anselmo Francisco Peretti | | Liberal Party | March 1, 1843 | July 1, 1844 | Provincial President appointed by Imperial Charter |
| 20 | Bernardo de Sousa Franco | | Conservative Party | July 1, 1844 | December 9, 1844 | Viscount of Sousa Franco |
| 21 | Caetano Maria Lopes Gama | | Conservative Party | December 9, 1844 | July 16, 1845 | Viscount of Maranguape |
| — | Henrique Marques Lisboa | | Conservative Party | July 16, 1845 | November 10, 1845 | |
| 22 | Antônio de Campos Mello | | Liberal Party | November 10, 1845 | August 12, 1847 | Provincial President appointed by Imperial Charter |
| — | Félix Britto de Mello | | Liberal Party | August 12, 1847 | May 16, 1848 | |
| 23 | João Bandeira de Mello | | Conservative Party | May 16, 1848 | February 5, 1849 | Provincial President appointed by Imperial Charter |
| — | Antônio Nunes de Aguiar | | Conservative Party | February 5, 1849 | July 14, 1849 | |
| 24 | José Bento Figueiredo | | Conservative Party | July 14, 1849 | June 5, 1850 | Viscount of Bom Conselho |
| — | Manuel Sobral Pinto | | Conservative Party | June 5, 1850 | October 15, 1850 | |
| 25 | José Bento Figueiredo | semmoldura | Conservative Party | October 15, 1850 | June 20, 1851 | Viscount of Bom Conselho |
| — | Manuel Sobral Pinto | | Conservative Party | June 20, 1851 | December 28, 1851 | |
| 26 | José Bento Figueiredo | | Conservative Party | December 28, 1851 | April 24, 1853 | Viscount of Bom Conselho |
| — | Manuel Sobral Pinto | | Conservative Party | April 24, 1853 | October 19, 1853 | |
| 27 | José Antônio Saraiva | | Liberal Party | October 19, 1853 | April 26, 1854 | Provincial President appointed by Imperial Charter |
| — | Roberto Calheiros | | Liberal Party | April 26, 1854 | October 14, 1854 | |
| — | Antônio Coelho de Sá e Albuquerque | | Liberal Party | October 14, 1854 | May 4, 1855 | Provincial President appointed by Imperial Charter |
| 28 | Roberto Calheiros de Mello | | Liberal Party | May 4, 1855 | November 7, 1855 | |
| — | Antônio Coelho de Sá e Albuquerque | | Liberal Party | November 7, 1855 | March 5, 1856 | Provincial President appointed by Imperial Charter |
| — | | | Liberal Party | March 5, 1856 | October 24, 1856 | |
| | Antônio Coelho de Sá e Albuquerque | | Partido Liberal | October 24, 1856 | April 13, 1857 | Provincial President appointed by Imperial Charter |
| — | Inácio Mendonça | | Liberal Party | August 14, 1857 | November 10, 1857 | |
| — | Ângelo Tomás do Amaral | | Liberal Party | November 10, 1857 | February 19, 1858 | Provincial President appointed by Imperial Charter |
| — | Roberto Calheiros | | Liberal Party | February 19, 1858 | April 16, 1858 | |
| — | Ângelo Tomás do Amaral | | Liberal Party | April 16, 1858 | February 19, 1859 | |
| — | Roberto Calheiros | | Liberal Party | February 19, 1859 | April 16, 1859 | |
| — | Agostinho Luís da Gama | | Liberal Party | April 16, 1859 | June 9, 1859 | |
| — | Roberto Calheiros | | Liberal Party | June 9, 1859 | October 1, 1859 | |
| 32 | Manuel Sousa Dantas | | Liberal Party | October 1, 1859 | May 1, 1860 | Provincial President appointed by Imperial Charter |
| 33 | Pedro Leão Veloso | semmoldura | Conservative Party | May 1, 1860 | March 15, 1861 | Provincial President appointed by Imperial Charter |
| 34 | Roberto Calheiros | | Liberal Party | March 15, 1861 | April 17, 1861 | Provincial President appointed by Imperial Charter |
| — | Antônio de Sousa Carvalho | | Liberal Party | April 17, 1861 | August 15, 1861 | |
| 35 | Roberto Calheiros | | Liberal Party | August 15, 1861 | December 6, 1862 | Provincial President appointed by Imperial Charter |
| — | Antônio de Sousa Carvalho | | Liberal Party | December 6, 1862 | July 15, 1863 | |
| 36 | João Marcelino Gonzaga | | Conservative Party | July 15, 1863 | March 16, 1864 | Provincial President appointed by Imperial Charter |
| 37 | Roberto Calheiros | | Liberal Party | March 16, 1864 | December 15, 1864 | Provincial President appointed by Imperial Charter |
| 38 | João Batista Campos | | Conservative Party | December 15, 1864 | July 31, 1865 | Viscount of Jari |
| 39 | Esperidião de Barros Pimentel | | Conservative Party | July 31, 1865 | April 19, 1866 | Provincial President appointed by Imperial Charter |
| — | Galdino Augusto da Silva | | Conservative Party | April 19, 1866 | June 30, 1866 | |
| 40 | José Martins Alencastre | semmoldura | Liberal Party | June 30, 1866 | April 18, 1867 | Acting President |
| — | Galdino Augusto da Silva | | Conservative Party | April 18, 1867 | July 22, 1867 | |
| — | Benjamim Franklin da Rocha | | Conservative Party | July 22, 1867 | July 30, 1867 | |
| 41 | Tomás do Bonfim Espíndola | semmoldura | Conservative Party | July 30, 1867 | August 6, 1867 | Provincial President appointed by Imperial Charter |
| — | João Francisco Duarte | | Conservative Party | August 6, 1867 | September 9, 1867 | |
| — | Antônio Moreira de Barros | semmoldura | Conservative Party | September 9, 1867 | May 25, 1868 | |
| — | Graciliano Pimentel | | Conservative Party | May 25, 1868 | July 27, 1868 | |
| 42 | Silvério Fernandes de Araújo | | Conservative Party | July 27, 1868 | October 2, 1868 | Provincial President appointed by Imperial Charter |
| — | José Bento Figueiredo Jr | | Conservative Party | October 2, 1868 | February 2, 1871 | |
| 43 | Silvério Fernandes de Araújo | | Conservative Party | February 2, 1871 | May 28, 1871 | Provincial President appointed by Imperial Charter |
| 44 | Silvino Elvídio Carneiro | | Liberal Party | May 28, 1871 | December 22, 1872 | Baron of Abiaí |
| 45 | Rômulo Perez Moreno | | Conservative Party | December 22, 1872 | March 15, 1874 | Provincial President appointed by Imperial Charter |
| 46 | João Vieira de Araújo | | Conservative Party | March 15, 1874 | March 11, 1875 | Provincial President appointed by Imperial Charter |
| 47 | João Tomé da Silva | | Conservative Party | March 11, 1875 | June 7, 1875 | Provincial President appointed by Imperial Charter |
| — | Caetano Cavalcanti | | Conservative Party | June 7, 1875 | January 1, 1876 | |
| — | Pedro Antônio Moreira | | Conservative Party | January 1, 1876 | December 20, 1976 | |
| — | Luís Eugênio Horta | | Conservative Party | December 20, 1876 | February 1, 1877 | |
| — | Pedro Antônio Moreira | | Conservative Party | February 1, 1877 | May 16, 1877 | |
| — | Antônio Passos Miranda | | Conservative Party | May 16, 1877 | January 2, 1878 | |
| 48 | Tomás do Bonfim Espíndola | semmoldura | Conservative Party | January 2, 1878 | March 11, 1878 | Provincial President appointed by Imperial Charter |
| 49 | Francisco Soares Brandão | | Liberal Party | March 11, 1878 | November 18, 1878 | Provincial President appointed by Imperial Charter |
| — | José de Araújo Barros | semmoldura | Liberal Party | November 18, 1878 | December 28, 1878 | |
| 50 | Cincinnato Pinto da Silva | semmoldura | Liberal Party | December 28, 1878 | June 29, 1880 | Provincial President appointed by Imperial Charter |
| — | Hermelindo Accioly de Barros Pimentel | semmoldura | Liberal Party | June 29, 1880 | July 6, 1880 | |
| 51 | José Eustáquio Ferreira | semmoldura | Liberal Party | July 6, 1880 | March 28, 1882 | Provincial President appointed by Imperial Charter |
| — | Augusto Pereira Franco | semmoldura | Liberal Party | March 28, 1882 | ? | |
| — | José Barbosa Torres | semmoldura | Liberal Party | ? | June 11, 1882 | |
| — | Augusto Pereira Franco | semmoldura | Liberal Party | June 11, 1882 | November 3, 1882 | |
| — | Carlos de Carvalho Gama | semmoldura | Liberal Party | November 3, 1882 | October 29, 1882 | |
| 52 | Domingos Antônio Rayol | semmoldura | Liberal Party | October 29, 1882 | December 21, 1882 | Baron of Guajará |
| 53 | Joaquim de Mello Barreto | semmoldura | Liberal Party | December 21, 1882 | May 5, 1883 | Provincial President appointed by Imperial Charter |
| — | Carlos de Carvalho Gama | semmoldura | Liberal Party | May 5, 1883 | August 25, 1883 | |
| 54 | Henrique de Magalhães Salles | semmoldura | Liberal Party | August 25, 1883 | September 17, 1884 | Provincial President appointed by Imperial Charter |
| — | Carlos de Carvalho Gama | semmoldura | Liberal Party | September 17, 1884 | September 11, 1884 | |
| — | José Bento Vieira de Barcellos | semmoldura | Liberal Party | September 11, 1884 | January 4, 1885 | |
| 55 | Antônio Tibúrcio Figueira | semmoldura | Conservative Party | January 4, 1885 | July 6, 1885 | Provincial President appointed by Imperial Charter |
| 56 | Pedro Leão Veloso Filho | semmoldura | Conservative Party | July 6, 1885 | October 7, 1885 | Provincial President appointed by Imperial Charter |
| 57 | Anfilófio Freire de Carvalho | semmoldura | Conservative Party | October 7, 1885 | March 26, 1886 | Provincial President appointed by Imperial Charter |
| 58 | Geminiano Brasil de Oliveira Góis | semmoldura | Conservative Party | March 26, 1886 | November 8, 1886 | Provincial President appointed by Imperial Charter |
| 59 | José Moreira Alves da Silva | | Liberal Party | November 8, 1886 | September 5, 1887 | Provincial President appointed by Imperial Charter |
| 60 | Antônio Caio da Silva Prado | | Liberal Party | September 5, 1887 | April 16, 1888 | Provincial President appointed by Imperial Charter |
| 61 | Manuel Gomes Ribeiro | semmoldura | Conservative Party | April 16, 1888 | June 10, 1888 | Baron of Traipu |
| 62 | José Cesário Monteiro de Barros | semmoldura | Liberal Party | June 10, 1888 | January 6, 1889 | Provincial President appointed by Imperial Charter |
| 63 | Aristides Augusto Milton | semmoldura | Conservative Party | January 6, 1889 | June 29, 1889 | Provincial President appointed by Imperial Charter |
| — | Manuel de Gusmão Lira | semmoldura | Conservative Party | June 29, 1889 | August 1, 1889 | |
| 64 | Victor Fernandes de Barros | semmoldura | Liberal Party | August 1, 1889 | November 15, 1889 | Provincial President appointed by Imperial Charter |
| 65 | Pedro Ribeiro Moreira | semmoldura | Liberal Party | November 15, 1889 | November 17, 1889 | Provincial President appointed by Imperial Charter |

== Rulers of the Republic (1889 — 2026) ==
Elected by direct vote
Elevated from deputy governor
Elected by indirect voting
Appointed directly by the central government in times of political and social upheaval and military dictatorship
President of the Judiciary in the post of Governor

| Nº | Nome | Imagem | Partido | Início do mandato | Fim do mandato | Observações |
|---|---|---|---|---|---|---|
First Brazilian Republic (1889–1930)
| 1 | Aureliano Augusto de Azevedo Pedra, Manuel Ribeiro Barretos de Meneses, Ricardo Brenand Monteiro | unframed | — | November 18, 1889 | November 21, 1889 | Provisional government |
| 2 | Tibúrcio Valério de Araújo | unframed | Democratic Republican Party | November 21, 1889 | December 2, 1889 | President of State appointed by the Federal Government |
| 3 | Pedro Paulino da Fonseca | unframed | Democratic Republican Party | December 2, 1889 | October 25, 1890 | President of State appointed by the Federal Government |
| — | Roberto Calheiros de Melo | unframed | Democratic Republican Party | October 25, 1889 | December 18, 1889 | Vice-president of State |
| 4 | Manuel de Araújo Góis | unframed | Democratic Republican Party | December 18, 1890 | June 12, 1891 | President of State appointed by the Federal Government |
| 5 | Pedro Paulino da Fonseca | unframed | Democratic Republican Party | June 12, 1891 | June 16, 1891 | President of State appointed by the Federal Government |
| 6 | Manuel de Araújo Góis | unframed | Democratic Republican Party | June 16, 1891 | November 23, 1891 | Vice-president of State |
| 7 | José Correia Teles; Manuel Ribeiro Barreto de Meneses; Jacinto de Assunção Pais de Mendonça; Carlos Jorge Calheiros de Lima | unframed | — | November 23, 1891 | November 28, 1891 | Provisional government |
| 8 | Manuel Gomes Ribeiro | unframed | Alagoas Conservative Party | November 28, 1891 | March 24, 1892 | President of State appointed by the Federal Government |
| 9 | Gabino Besouro | unframed | Alagoas Conservative Party | March 24, 1892 | July 16, 1894 | President of State appointed by the Federal Government |
| 10 | Manuel Sampaio Marques; José Tavares da Costa; Miguel Soares Palmeira | unframed | — | July 16, 1894 | July 17, 1894 | Provisional government |
| 11 | Tibúrcio Valeriano da Rocha Lins | unframed | Alagoas Conservative Party | July 17, 1894 | October 17, 1894 | President of State appointed by the Federal Government |
| 12 | Manuel Gomes Ribeiro | unframed | Alagoas Conservative Party | October 17, 1894 | July 16, 1895 | President of State appointed by the Federal Government |
| 13 | José Vieira Peixoto | unframed | Democratic Economist Party of Alagoas | July 16, 1895 | June 12, 1897 | Vice-President of State |
| 14 | Manuel José Duarte | unframed | Federal Republican Party | June 12, 1897 | June 17, 1899 | President of State appointed by the Federal Government |
| 15 | Francisco Manuel dos Santos Pacheco | unframed | Democratic Republican Party | June 17, 1899 | June 12, 1900 | President of State appointed by the Federal Government |
| 16 | Euclides Vieira Malta | unframed | Democratic Economist Party of Alagoas | June 12, 1900 | June 12, 1903 | State President elected at popular rallies |
| 17 | Joaquim Paulo Vieira Malta | unframed | Democratic Republican Party | June 12, 1903 | November 1, 1905 | State President elected at popular rallies |
| — | Antônio Máximo da Cunha Rego | unframed | Democratic Republican Party | November 1, 1905 | June 12, 1906 | Vice-President |
| 18 | Euclides Vieira Malta | unframed | Democratic Republican Party | June 12, 1906 | March 3, 1909 | State President elected at popular rallies |
| 19 | José Miguel de Vasconcelos | unframed | Democratic Republican Party | March 3, 1909 | June 12, 1909 | President of the State Senate |
| | Euclides Vieira Malta | unframed | Democratic Republican Party | June 12, 1909 | March 13, 1912 | State President elected at popular rallies |
| 20 | Macário das Chagas Rocha Lessa | unframed | Liberal Party | March 13, 1912 | June 12, 1912 | President of the Chamber of Deputies |
| 21 | Clodoaldo da Fonseca | unframed | Democratic Economist Party of Alagoas | June 12, 1912 | June 12, 1915 | State President elected at popular rallies |
| 23 | João Batista Accioli Jr | unframed | Democratic Republican Party | June 12, 1915 | June 12, 1918 | State President elected at popular rallies |
| 24 | José Fernandes de Barros Lima | unframed | Democratic Economist Party of Alagoas | June 12, 1918 | March 1, 1921 | State President elected at popular rallies |
| — | Manuel Capitolino da Rocha Carvalho | unframed | Democratic Republican Party | March 1, 1921 | June 12, 1921 | Vice-President of the State |
| — | José Fernandes de Barros Lima | unframed | Democratic Economist Party of Alagoas | June 12, 1921 | June 12, 1924 | State President elected at popular rallies |
| 25 | Pedro da Costa Rego | unframed | National Democratic Party | June 12, 1924 | June 7, 1928 | State President elected at popular rallies |
| — | José Júlio Cansanção | unframed | National Democratic Party | June 7, 1928 | June 12, 1928 | Vice-president of State |
| 26 | Álvaro Correia Pais | unframed | National Democratic Party | June 12, 1928 | October 10, 1930 | State President elected at popular rallies |
Second and Third Brazilian Republics (1930–1945)
| — | Pedro Reginaldo Teixeira | unframed | Republican Democratic Union | October 10, 1930 | October 14, 1930 | Commander of the Military Police of Alagoas |
| 27 | Hermilo de Freitas Melro | unframed | Progressive Party | October 14, 1930 | August 9, 1931 | Appointed Federal Intervener |
| 28 | Luís de França Albuquerque | unframed | Liberal Party | August 9, 1931 | October 31, 1931 | Appointed Federal Intervener |
| 29 | Tasso de Oliveira Tinoco | unframed | Liberal Alliance | October 31, 1931 | October 25, 1932 | Appointed Federal Intervener |
| 30 | Luís de França Albuquerque | unframed | Liberal Party | October 25, 1932 | January 10, 1933 | Appointed Federal Intervener |
| 31 | Affonso de Carvalho | unframed | Liberal Alliance | January 10, 1933 | March 2, 1934 | Appointed Federal Intervener |
| 32 | Temístocles Vieira de Azevedo | unframed | Liberal Alliance | March 2, 1934 | May 1, 1934 | Appointed Federal Intervener |
| 33 | Osman Loureiro | unframed | Liberal Alliance | May 1, 1934 | March 26, 1935 | Appointed Federal Intervener |
| 34 | Edgar de Góis Monteiro | unframed | Democratic Party | March 26, 1935 | May 10, 1935 | Appointed Federal Intervener |
| 35 | Benedito Augusto da Silva | unframed | Conservative Republican League | May 10, 1935 | May 27, 1935 | Appointed Federal Intervener |
| 36 | Osman Loureiro | unframed | Brazilian Labour Party | May 27, 1935 | November 24, 1937 | Governor elected by the Assembly |
| — | Osman Loureiro | unframed | Brazilian Labour Party | November 24, 1937 | October 31, 1940 | Appointed Federal Intervener |
| 37 | José Maria Correia das Neves | unframed | National Democratic Party | October 31, 1940 | February 19, 1941 | Appointed Federal Intervener |
| 38 | Ismar de Góis Monteiro | unframed | Social Democratic Party | February 19, 1941 | November 10, 1945 | Appointed Federal Intervener |
Fourth Brazilian Republic (1945–1964)
| 39 | Edgar de Góis Monteiro | unframed | Social Democratic Party | November 10, 1945 | December 18, 1945 | Appointed Federal Intervener |
| 40 | Antonio Guedes de Miranda | unframed | Social Democratic Party | December 19, 1945 | March 29, 1947 | Appointed Federal Intervener |
| 41 | Silvestre Péricles | unframed | Social Democratic Party | March 29, 1947 | January 31, 1951 | Governor elected by universal suffrage |
| 42 | Arnon de Mello | unframed | National Democratic Union | January 31, 1951 | January 31, 1956 | Governor elected by universal suffrage |
| 43 | Sebastião Muniz Falcão | unframed | Progressive Social Party | January 31, 1956 | September 15, 1957 | Governor elected by universal suffrage |
| — | Sizenando Nabuco de Melo | unframed | Brazilian Labour Party | September 15, 1957 | January 24, 1958 | Vice-governor in office, he took over the state government when Governor Muniz Falcão was put on trial. He remained in office until 1958, when Muniz Falcão was acquitted and resumed the office. |
| — | Sebastião Muniz Falcão | unframed | Progressive Social Party | January 24, 1958 | January 31, 1961 | Governor elected by universal suffrage |
| 44 | Luiz Cavalcante | unframed | National Democratic Union | January 31, 1961 | January 31, 1966 | Governor elected by universal suffrage |
Fifth Brazilian Republic (1964–1985)
| 45 | João José Batista Tubino | unframed | National Renewal Alliance | January 31, 1966 | August 15, 1966 | Federal Interventor |
| 46 | Antônio Simeão de Lamenha Filho | unframed | National Renewal Alliance | August 15, 1966 | March 15, 1971 | Governor appointed by the Legislative Assembly |
| 47 | Afrânio Lages | unframed | National Renewal Alliance | March 15, 1971 | March 15, 1975 | Governor appointed by the Legislative Assembly |
| 48 | Divaldo Suruagy | unframed | National Renewal Alliance | March 15, 1975 | August 14, 1978 | Governor appointed by the Legislative Assembly |
| 49 | Ernandes Lopes Dorvillé | unframed | — | August 14, 1978 | September 14, 1978 | Interim governor, President of the Court of Justice |
| 50 | Geraldo Mello | unframed | National Renewal Alliance | September 14, 1978 | March 15, 1979 | Governor appointed by the Legislative Assembly |
| 51 | Guilherme Palmeira | unframed | Democratic Social Party | March 15, 1979 | March 15, 1982 | Governor appointed by the Legislative Assembly |
| 52 | Teobaldo Vasconcelos | unframed | Democratic Social Party | March 15, 1982 | March 15, 1983 | Vice-Governor appointed by the Legislative Assembly |
| 53 | Divaldo Suruagy | unframed | Democratic Social Party | March 15, 1983 | May 14, 1986 | Governor elected by universal suffrage |
Sixth Brazilian Republic (1985–present)
| 54 | José de Medeiros Tavares | unframed | Democratic Social Party | May 14, 1986 | March 15, 1987 | Vice-Governor elected by direct vote, assumed as a result of the resignation of Divaldo Suruagy |
| 55 | Fernando Collor | unframed | Brazilian Democratic Movement | March 15, 1987 | May 14, 1989 | Governor elected by universal suffrage |
| 56 | Moacir Andrade | unframed | National Reconstruction Party | May 14, 1989 | March 15, 1991 | Vice-Governor elected by direct vote, assumed as a result of the resignation of Fernando Collor |
| 57 | Geraldo Bulhões | unframed | Social Christian Party | March 15, 1991 | December 31, 1994 | Governor elected by universal suffrage |
| 58 | Divaldo Suruagy | unframed | Brazilian Democratic Movement | January 1, 1995 | July 17, 1997 | Governor elected by universal suffrage |
| 59 | Manoel Gomes de Barros (Mano) | unframed | Brazilian Labour Party | July 17, 1997 | December 31, 1998 | Vice-Governor elected by direct vote, assumed as a result of the resignation of Divaldo Suruagy |
| 60 | Ronaldo Lessa | | Brazilian Socialist Party | January 1, 1999 | December 21, 2002 | Governor elected by universal suffrage |
| 60 | Ronaldo Lessa | | Brazilian Socialist Party | January 1, 2003 | March 31, 2006 | Governor re-elected by universal suffrage |
| 61 | Luís Abílio de Sousa Neto | unframed | Democratic Labour Party | March 31, 2006 | December 31, 2006 | Vice-Governor elected by direct vote, assumed as a result of the resignation of Luís Abílio de Sousa Neto |
| 62 | Teotônio Vilela Filho | | Brazilian Social Democracy Party | January 1, 2007 | December 31, 2010 | Governor elected by universal suffrage |
| 62 | Teotônio Vilela Filho | | Brazilian Social Democracy Party | January 1, 2011 | December 31, 2014 | Governor re-elected by universal suffrage |
| 63 | Renan Filho | | Brazilian Democratic Movement | January 1, 2015 | December 31, 2018 | Governor elected by universal suffrage |
| 63 | Renan Filho | | Brazilian Democratic Movement | January 1, 2019 | April 2, 2022 | Governor re-elected by universal suffrage |
| — | Klever Rêgo Loureiro | | — | April 2, 2022 | May 15, 2022 | Interim governor, President of the Court of Justice |
| 64 | Paulo Dantas | unframed | Brazilian Democratic Movement | May 15, 2022 | December 31, 2022 | Governor indirectly elected by the Assembly (Note: Removed from office between 11 and 25 October 2022 by order from Superior Court of Justice; during the removal, the vice-governor José Wanderley Neto, temporarily assumed the position.) |
| 64 | Paulo Dantas | unframed | Brazilian Democratic Movement | January 1, 2023 | Present | Governor re-elected by universal suffrage |
