= Fátima Canuto =

Brazilian lawyer, economist, and politician

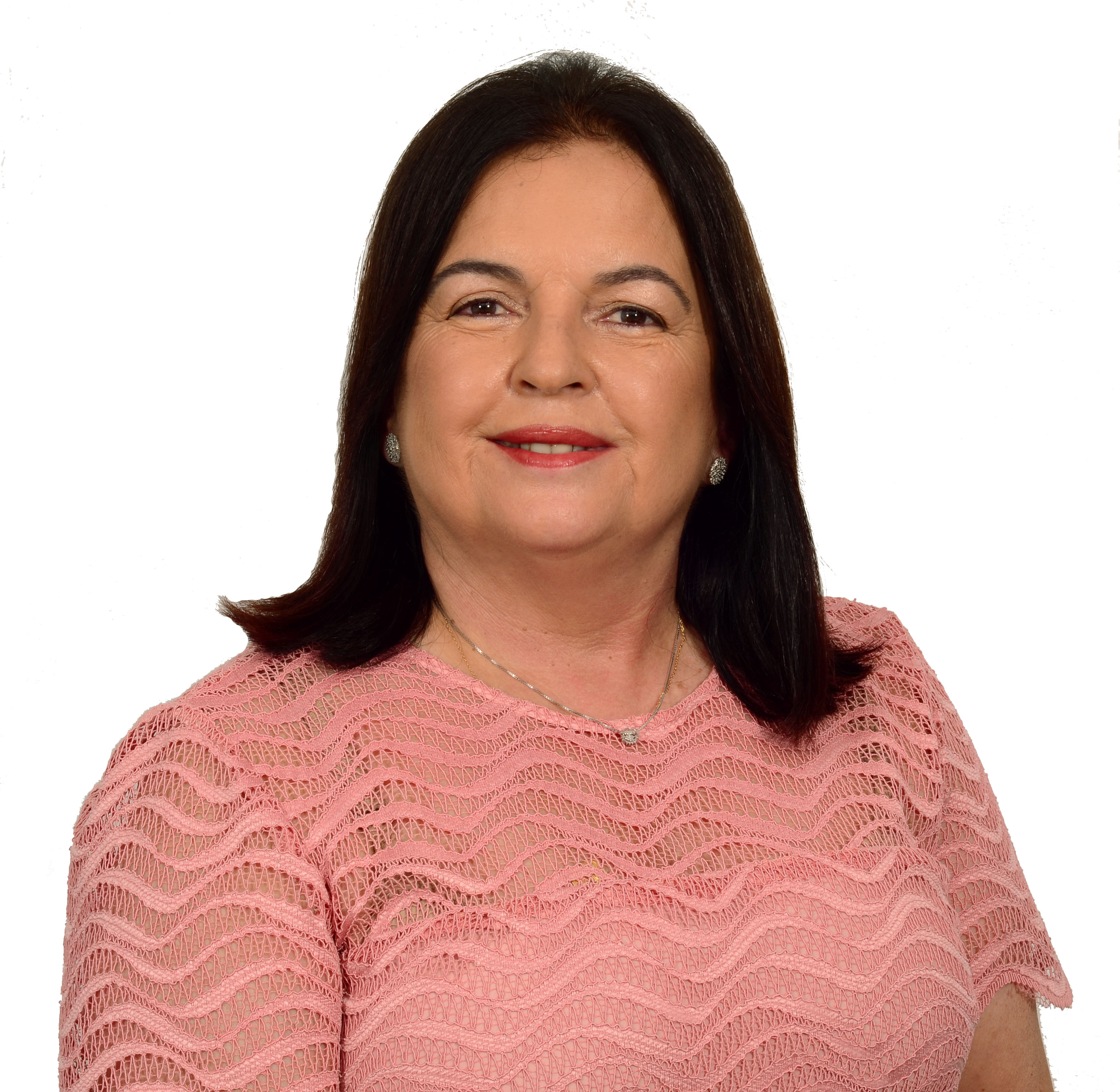
- Fátima in 2022

State Deputy of Alagoas
- Incumbent
- Assumed office 1 February 2019

Personal details
- Born: August 5, 1958 (age 68) Maceió, Alagoas, Brazil
- Citizenship: Brazil
- Party: PRTB (2018–2022); MDB (2022–present)
- Education: Federal University of Alagoas
- Occupation: Lawyer; Economist

Maria de Fátima Moreira Canuto Rocha (August 5, 1958) is a Brazilian lawyer, economist, and politician affiliated with the Brazilian Democratic Movement (MDB). Since 2019, she has served as a state representative for the state of Alagoas.

== Biography ==
=== Early years and education ===
Daughter of Rubens Canuto, who served three terms as a representative in the Legislative Assembly of Alagoas, Maria was born in Maceió, the capital of the state of Alagoas, in 1958. In the field of education, she earned a law degree from Cesmac University Center and a degree in economics from the Federal University of Alagoas (UFAL).

=== Career and politics ===
After living in the capital of Alagoas, she moved to Pilar and worked with the Alagoas Women’s Network Against Cancer. She served as deputy secretary of the State Department of Social Assistance and was municipal secretary of health in Pilar. In 2018, she ran for state representative in Alagoas as a candidate for the Brazilian Labour Renewal Party (PRTB) and was elected after receiving more than 37,000 votes. Following disagreements with the PRTB in 2022, she joined the Brazilian Democratic Movement (MDB)., at a ceremony attended by Senator Renan Calheiros. In the new party, she was reelected to the position of state representative after receiving more than 40,000 votes.

==== Electoral performance ====
Year	Position	Party	Votes	Result	Ref.
2018	State deputy from Alagoas	PRTB	37 151	Elected	
2022	State deputy from Alagoas	MDB	41 319	Elected	

== Personal life ==
She is married to Renato Rezende, a physician, and they have two children.
