= Paulo Dantas =

Governor of Alagoas since 2022

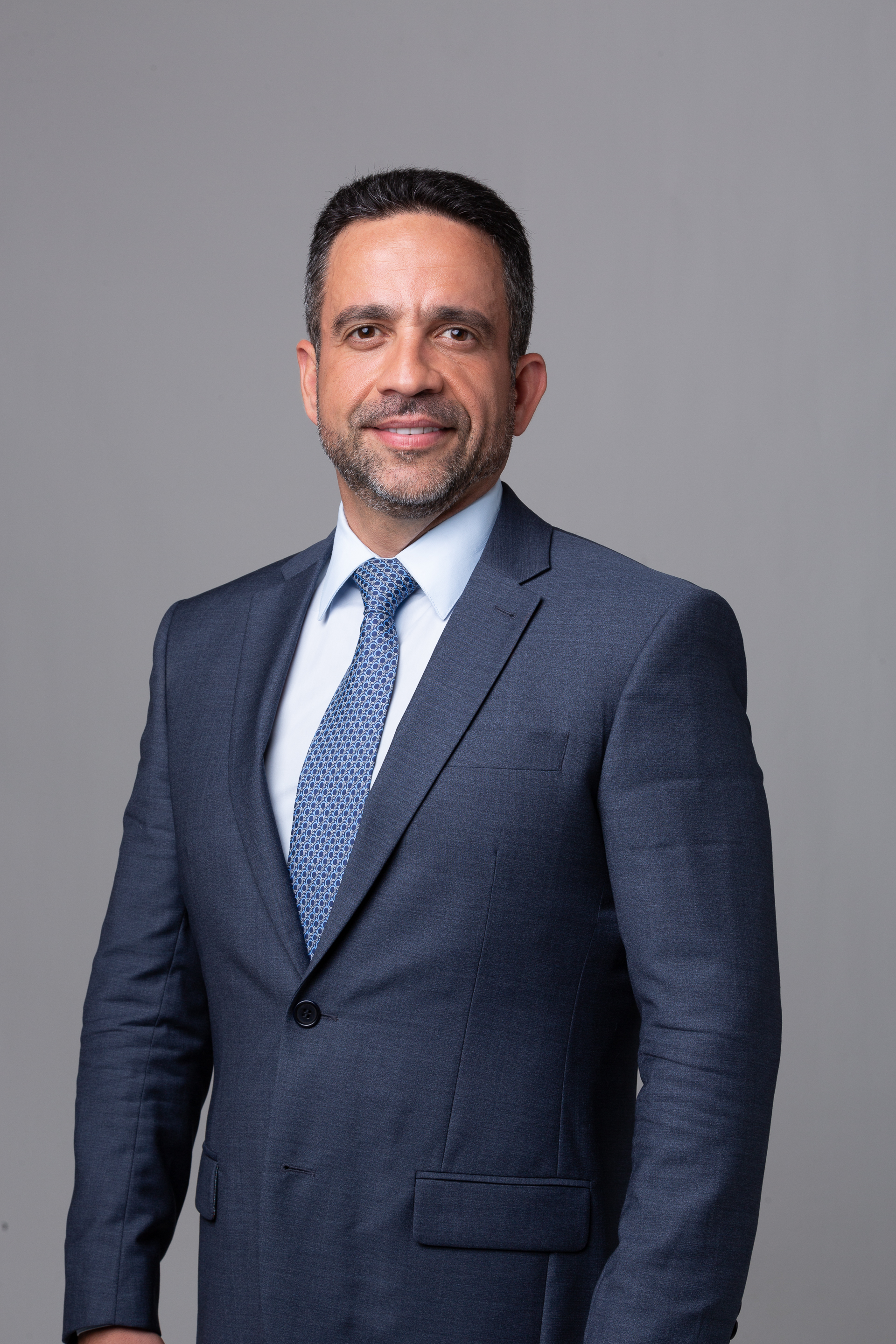
- Official portrait, 2023.

Governor of Alagoas
- Incumbent
- Assumed office 15 May 2022
- Vice Governor: José Wanderley Neto (2022); Ronaldo Lessa (2023–present)
- Preceded by: Klever Loureiro

Member of the Legislative Assembly of Alagoas
- In office 1 February 2019 – 15 May 2022
- Constituency: At-large

Mayor of Batalha
- In office 1 January 2005 – 1 January 2013
- Vice Mayor: Aloísio Rodrigues
- Preceded by: Xico Douca
- Succeeded by: Aloísio Rodrigues

Personal details
- Born: Paulo Suruagy do Amaral Dantas; 19 March 1979 (age 47) Maceió, Alagoas, Brazil
- Party: MDB (2003–present)
- Spouse: Marina Cintra (m. 1999)
- Education: Cesmac University Center (BBA)
- Profession: Business administrator, farmer

Paulo Suruagy do Amaral Dantas (born 19 March 1979) is a Brazilian politician affiliated with the Brazilian Democratic Movement (MDB), is the current governor of Alagoas.

== Biography ==
Born in Maceió, the capital city of Alagoas, he is the son of former president of the Legislative Assembly of Alagoas Luiz Dantas. In 2004, he was elected as mayor in the municipality of Batalha, being re-elected in 2008.

On 15 May 2022, he was indirectly elected for a "buffer term" until 31 December 2022, through the Legislative Assembly of Alagoas, after the last directly elected governor, Renan Filho, resigned in order to run for the Senate in the 2022 Brazilian general election and the Vice Governor at the time Luciano Barbosa, had resigned in 2020 after being elected as the mayor of Arapiraca.

=== 2022 election ===
Dantas is currently running for a first full term as Governor of Alagoas. He received 46.64% of the vote in the first round and face right-wing candidate Rodrigo Cunha in the second round. In the second round, he won the election with 46.64% of the valid votes.

Political offices
Preceded by Xico Douca	Mayor of Batalha; 2005–2013	Succeeded by Aloísio Rodrigues
Preceded by Klever Loureiro	Governor of Alagoas; 2022–present	Incumbent
