= Tenorinho Malta =

Brazilian politician (born 1989)

State Deputy of Alagoas
- Incumbent
- Assumed office 1 February 2027
- Constituency: Alagoas

Personal details
- Born: 27 December 1989 (age 36)
- Party: Brazilian Social Democracy Party

Luiz Celso Malta Brandão Filho (born 27 December 1989), better known as Tenorinho Malta, is a Brazilian politician who was elected member of the Legislative Assembly of Alagoas in 2026.
