= Gabi Gonçalves =

Brazilian politician

- Gabriela Cristina Gonçalves da Silva Cordeiro
- Gabi in 2026

State Deputy of Alagoas
- Incumbent
- Assumed office February 1, 2023

Secretary of Institutional Relations of Rio Largo
- In office 2020–2022

Personal details
- Born: November 17, 1999 (age 26) Rio Largo, Alagoas, Brazil
- Party: Brazilian Democratic Movement
- Other political affiliations: Progressistas (2020–2026)
- Parent(s): Gilberto Gonçalves; Cristina Gonçalves
- Occupation: Politician
- Nickname: Gabi Gonçalves

Gabriela Cristina Gonçalves da Silva Cordeiro, better known as Gabi Gonçalves (born November 17, 1999), is a Brazilian politician. In 2022, she was elected state deputy for Alagoas.

== Biography ==
Gabriela Gonçalves was born in the city of Rio Largo, in the interior of the state of Alagoas, in 1999. The daughter of Gilberto Gonçalves, who was mayor twice of Rio Largo, and Cristina Gonçalves, who was deputy mayor of the municipality during Gilberto's administration, Gabriela began her political career as secretary of Institutional Relations at the Rio Largo City Hall, appointed by her father. She remained in office between 2020 and 2022.

In 2022, she joined the Progressistas (PP) party to run for state deputy in Alagoas. With strong support from Arthur Lira, a traditional political ally of Gilberto Nascimento, Gabriela was elected to the position with over 25,000 votes. Elected at the age of 22, she became the youngest member of the Legislative Assembly of Alagoas. She was one of six women elected to the 27-seat Assembly and one of four representatives elected by the PP, forming the second largest bloc in the house, behind only the Brazilian Democratic Movement (MDB). In April 2026, she sought to join the Workers’ Party (PT), but the state executive committee did not accept her into the party. She joined the MDB that same month. She was elected to her second term after receiving more than 50,000 votes.

=== Electoral performance ===
Gabi Gonçalves' electoral performance
Year	Position	Party	Votes	Result	Ref.
2022	State Deputy for Alagoas	Progressistas	29.336	Elected	
2026	State representative from Alagoas	MDB	52.777	Elected	
