= Divaldo Suruagy =

Brazilian economist and politician

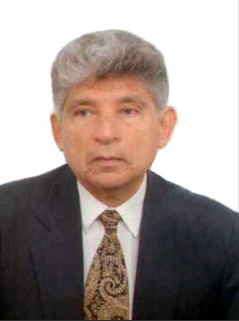

Governor of Alagoas
- In office 1975–1978
- Preceded by: Afrânio Salgado Lages
- Succeeded by: Ernandes Dorvillé

Governor of Alagoas
- In office 1983–1986
- Preceded by: Teobaldo Barbosa
- Succeeded by: José de Medeiros Tavares

Governor of Alagoas
- In office January 1, 1995 – July 17, 1997
- Preceded by: Geraldo Bulhões
- Succeeded by: Manuel Gomes de Barros

Personal details
- Born: March 5, 1937 São Luís do Quitunde, Alagoas, Brazil
- Died: March 21, 2015 (aged 78) Maceió, Alagoas, Brazil

Divaldo Suruagy (March 5, 1937 – March 21, 2015) was a Brazilian economist and politician. Suruagy served as the governor of Brazilian state of Alagoas for three tenures: 1975–1978, 1983–1986, and 1995–1997.

== See also ==
- List of mayors of Maceió
