= Cibele Moura =

Brazilian politician (born 1997)

- Moura in 2026

Member of the Legislative Assembly of Alagoas
- Incumbent
- Assumed office 1 February 2019

Personal details
- Born: 17 July 1997 (age 29)
- Party: Brazilian Democratic Movement (since 2022)
- Other political affiliations: Brazilian Social Democracy Party (2016–2022)
- Relatives: Abrahão Moura (great-grandfather)

Cibele Corado de Moura (born 17 July 1997) is a Brazilian politician serving as a member of the Legislative Assembly of Alagoas since 2019. She was the youngest woman elected to a state legislative assembly of Brazil in the 2018 general election. She previously served as president of the youth wing of the Brazilian Social Democracy Party in Alagoas. She is the great-granddaughter of Abrahão Moura.
