= Francisco Manuel dos Santos Pacheco =

- Born: 1850; São Miguel dos Campos, Alagoas, Brazil
- Died: January 2, 1926 (aged 75–76); Alagoas, Brazil
- Occupation: Governor of Alagoas

Francisco Manuel dos Santos Pacheco (São Miguel dos Campos, Alagoas, Brazil 1850 – Alagoas, Brazil January 2, 1926) was a Brazilian soldier, politician, colonel, senator in Alagoas and the 12th Republican governor of Alagoas. He belonged to the Santos Pacheco family.

He was the owner of the engenho Brejo in Coruripe, Alagoas.

He was president of Alagoas from June 17, 1899 to June 12, 1900 and state senator in the periods 1897-1898, 1901-1906 and 1913-1916. He was also Vice-Governor of Manuel José Duarte from 12 June 1897 to 12 June 1899.

He was elected Vice-Governor in 1897 with a large majority of votes, 13,394 compared to Tibureio Araujo's 371. He was also Vice-Governor of Euclides Viera Malta from 1900 to 1903 and of Joaquim Paulo Viera Malta from 1903 to 1906.

In July 1899, the Velo-Sport was held, a bicycle race in honor of Governor Francisco dos Santos Pacheco. The race had Jacintho Nunes Leite Filho as the track judge.

The news that the plague had arrived at the port of Santos lit the warning beacon in Alagoas, forcing the state and the municipality to increase the cleaning of the city. To organize the sanitary measures, Governor Francisco Manuel dos Santos Pacheco, convened the General Council of Hygiene, requesting that a group of convicts be responsible for the general cleaning of the city, and recommending care for the precarious housing of the poorest.

On April 19, 1900, the vice-governor Colonel Francisco Manuel reorganized the Lyceu de Artes e Ofícios using Decree No. 177 of February 9, 1900.

He also authorized the purchase of a building, for 8:500$000 de Réis to speed up the return of activities, appointed a commission to prepare the internal regulations.

He was the brother of João Pacheco de Lima and was married to Thereza Francisca da Silva Pacheco, who was his first lady, who died in 1908.

Francisco Manoel was a member of the executive committee of the Democratic Party and Vice-President of the Maceió Branch. In 1915, Francisco swore in Dr. João Baptista Accioly Júnior and Colonel Francisco da Rocha Cavalcante, for the positions of Governor and Vice-Governor, respectively.

On December 27, 1925, Colonel Francisco Manuel was very ill. he died in Maceió on January 2, 1926.

On January 30, 1926, several masses were organized by the Democratic Party in the cathedral of Maceió in his memory. Several people attended Francis' thirtieth-day Mass.

On January 30 during the Democratic Party convention, Senator Fernandes Lima made a speech where he cited the virtues of Colonel Santos Pacheco, after which he appointed Governor Costa Rego to fill the vacancy left by the colonel.

On April 27, 1926, a vote of condolence was held in memory of the colonel in the Maceió city council.

== Tributes ==
Santos Pacheco Street (Former Santos Pacheco Avenue) and Santos Pacheco - downtown in Maceió were named by Law No. 63 of February 5, 1902.

Santos Pacheco Avenue in Junqueiro and Santos Pacheco Street also in Junqueiro.

Political offices
Preceded by Manuel José Duarte	Governor of Alagoas; 1899–1900	Succeeded by Euclides Vieira Malta
