= Davi Davino Filho =

Brazilian politician (born 1987)

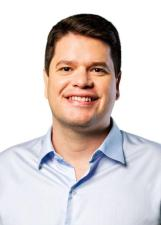
- Davino in 2022

Member of the Legislative Assembly of Alagoas
- In office 1 January 2015 – 1 January 2023

Personal details
- Born: 1 October 1987 (age 39)
- Party: Republicans (since 2025)

David Cabral Davino Filho (born 1 October 1987) is a Brazilian politician. From 2015 to 2023, he was a member of the Legislative Assembly of Alagoas. From 2015 to 2016, he served as chairman of the Science and Technology Committee.
