= Klever Loureiro =

Brazilian economist and politician

Interim Governor of Alagoas
- In office April 2, 2022 – May 15, 2022
- Preceded by: Renan Filho
- Succeeded by: Paulo Dantas

President of the Court of Justice of Alagoas
- Incumbent
- Assumed office January 15, 2021
- Preceded by: Tutmés Airan

Desembargador of the Court of Justice of Alagoas
- Incumbent
- Assumed office 22 June 2012

Personal details
- Born: Klever Rêgo Loureiro; February 20, 1952 (age 74) Recife, Pernambuco, Brazil
- Education: Centro Universitário Cesmac
- Profession: Lawyer

Klever Rêgo Loureiro (born February 20, 1952) is a Brazilian judge and the president of the Court of Justice of Alagoas.

Between April 2 and May 15, 2022, he served as interim governor of the state of Alagoas.

== Life ==
Loureiro was born on February 20, 1952, in Recife, capital of the state of Pernambuco.

On April 2, 2022, he became interim governor of Alagoas, until the inauguration of the elected official in an indirect election to be held in 30 days. Paulo Dantas was elected by the Legislative Assembly of Alagoas as his successor on May 15, 2022.

The post was vacant after Renan Filho's resignation to run for the Federal Senate. The former Vice Governor, Luciano Barbosa, had already resigned in order to take office as the mayor of Arapiraca in 2021. In addition, the president of the Legislative Assembly of Alagoas, Marcelo Victor, who was supposed to take over by the line of succession, abstained from doing it because taking over the executive position would prevent him from being reelected as a state deputy in the 2022 Brazilian general election.

Political offices
Preceded by Renan Filho	Governor of Alagoas; April 2, 2022 – May 15, 2022	Succeeded by Paulo Dantas
