= Batalha, Alagoas =

Municipality of Alagoas, Brazil

Batalha
- Municipality of Alagoas, Brazil
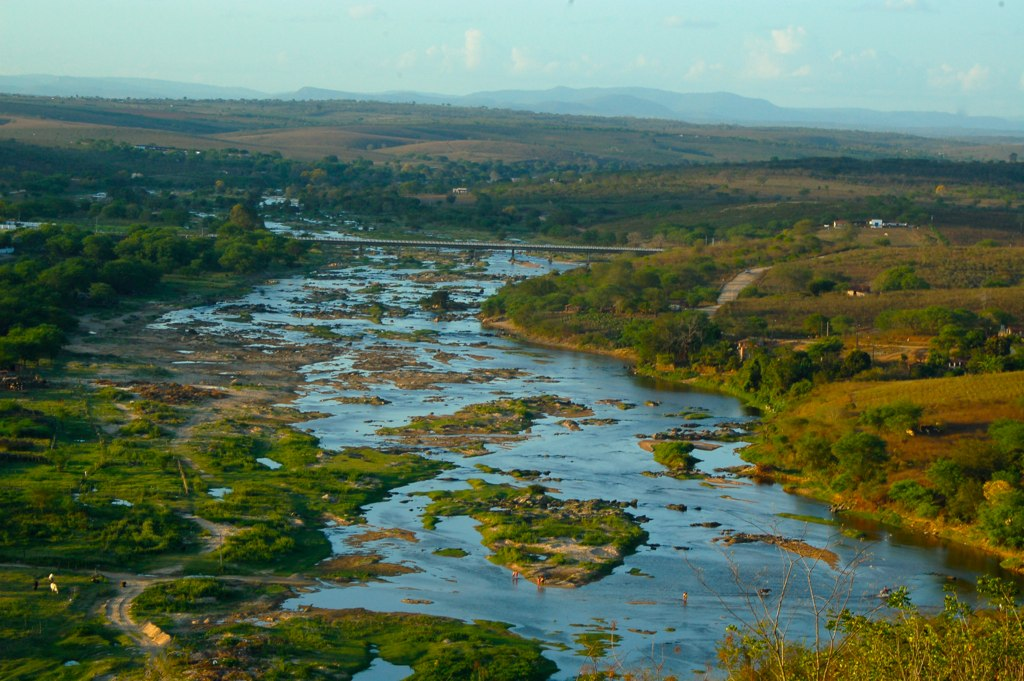
- Ipanema River in Batalha

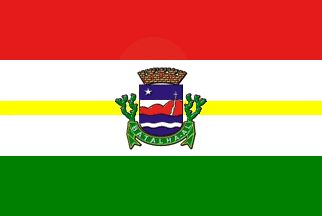
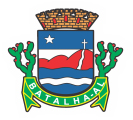
- Flag Coat of arms

- Location of Batalha in Alagoas

- Location within Brazil Location within South America
- Coordinates: 9°40′40″S 37°7′29″W
- Country: Brazil
- Region: Northeast
- State: Alagoas
- Founded: 17 September 1949

Government
  - Mayor: Wagney Dantas Correia Caje (MDB) (2025-2028)
  - Vice Mayor: Izaias Gomes Bezerra (PSB) (2025-2028)

Area
  - Total: 331.752 km^{2} (128.090 sq mi)
- Elevation: 127 m (417 ft)

Population (2022)
  - Total: 16,448
  - Density: 52.07/km^{2} (134.9/sq mi)
- Demonym: Batalhense (Brazilian Portuguese)
- Time zone: UTC-03:00 (Brasília Time)
- Postal code: 57420-000
- HDI (2010): 0.594 – medium
- Website: batalha.al.gov.br

Batalha (Central northeastern portuguese pronunciation: [bɐˈtaʎɐ]) is a municipality located in the western half of the Brazilian state of Alagoas. Its population is 18,338 (2020) and its area is 321 km^{2} (124 sq mi).
