= Rio Largo =

Municipality of Alagoas, Brazil

- Municipality of Alagoas, Brazil
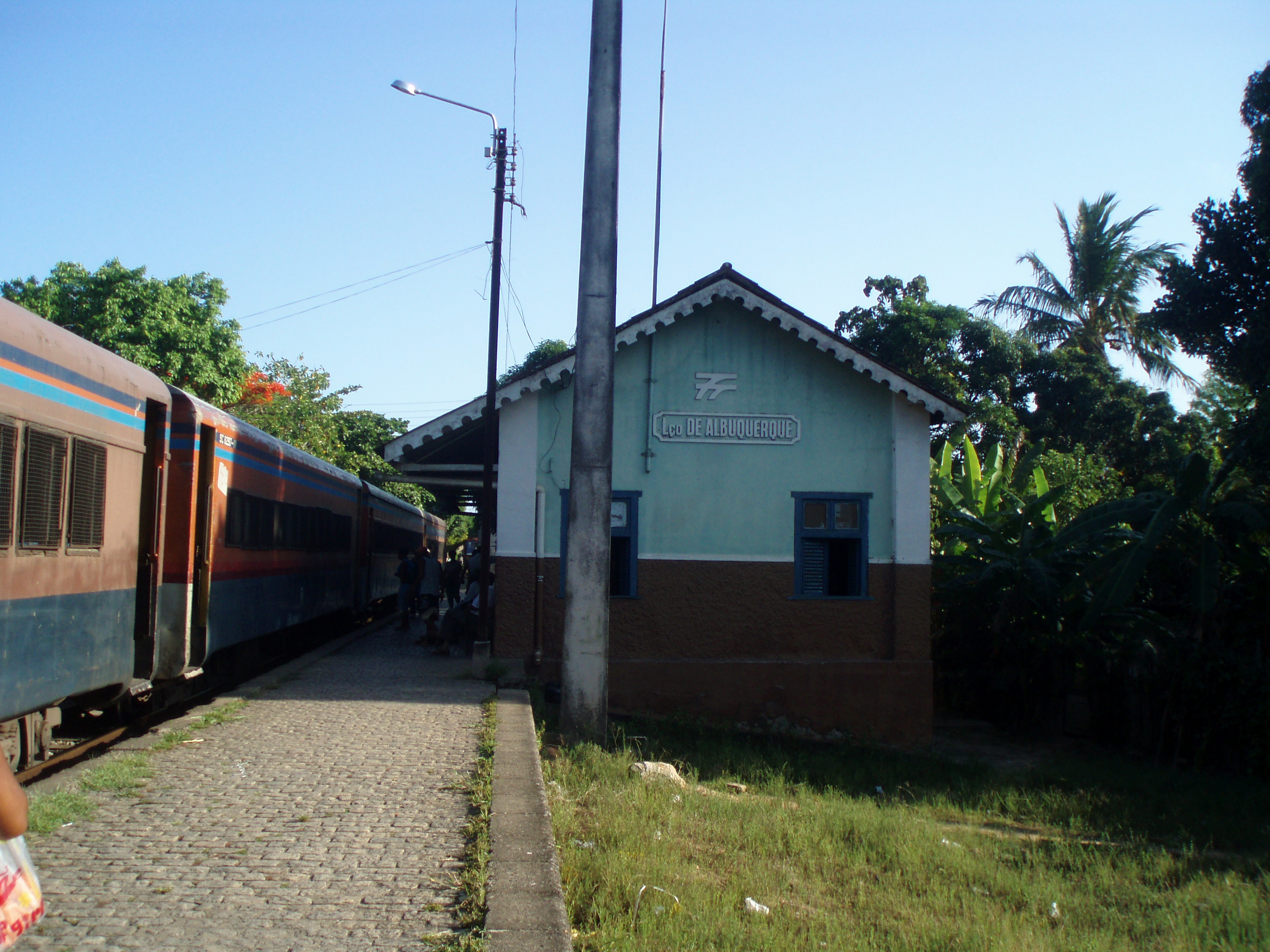
- Lourenço de Albuquerque train station

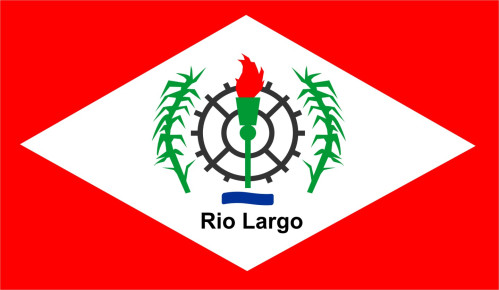
- Flag

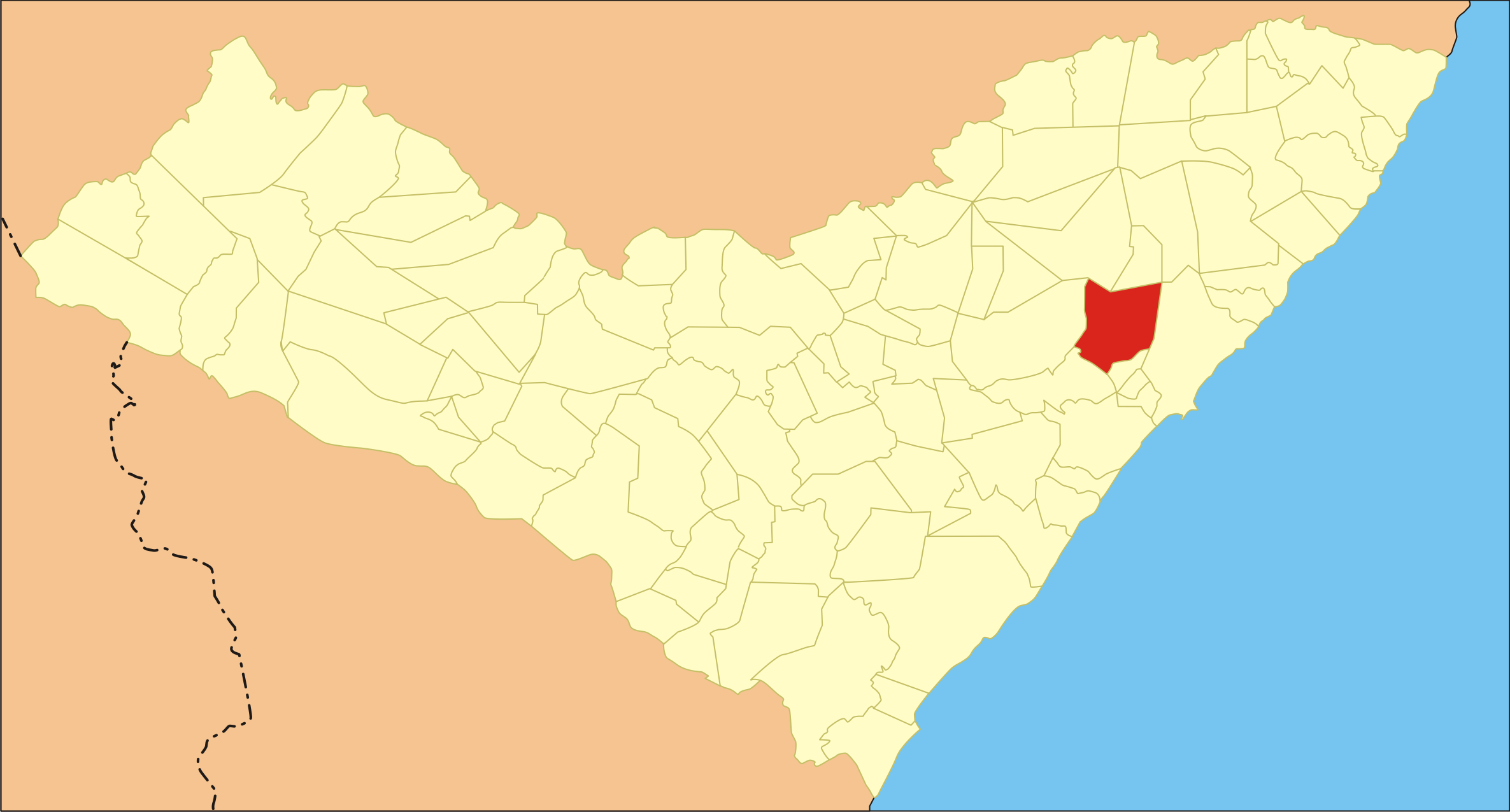
- Location of Rio Largo in Alagoas

- Location within Brazil Location within South America
- Coordinates: 9°28′40″S 35°51′10″W
- Country: Brazil
- Region: Northeast
- State: Alagoas
- Founded: 31 March 1938

Government
  - Mayor: Pedro Carlos da Silva Neto (PP) (2025–2028)
  - Vice Mayor: Peterson Henrique da Silva Santos (PP) (2025–2028)

Area
  - Total: 293.816 km^{2} (113.443 sq mi)
- Elevation: 130 m (430 ft)

Population (2022)
  - Total: 93,927
  - Density: 319.68/km^{2} (828.0/sq mi)
- Demonym: Rio-larguense (Brazilian Portuguese)
- Time zone: UTC– 03:00 (Brasília Time)
- Postal code: 57100-000, 57110-000
- HDI (2010): 0.643 – medium
- Website: riolargo.al.gov.br

Rio Largo (Central northeastern portuguese pronunciation: [ˈɦiw ˈlaɦɡu]) is a municipality made in 1915 located in the Brazilian state of Alagoas. Its population estimated was 75,394 (census of 2020) and its area is 309 km^{2} (119 sq mi).

It all started in 1915, Rio Largo became the "village of Santa Luzia do Norte", but in 1938, it became an independent city, being founded Rio Largo.

== See also ==
- List of municipalities in Alagoas
