= Antônio Pinto Chichorro da Gama =

Brazilian politician

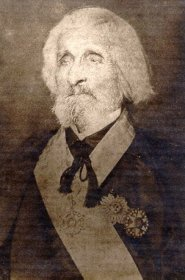

Minister of the Supreme Court of Justice
- Monarch: Pedro II

Personal details
- Born: c. 1800 Nazaré, Bahia
- Died: 10 June 1887 (aged 87) Rio de Janeiro
- Party: Praia Party; Liberal Party
- Occupation: Juiz de fora; Desembargador

Antônio Pinto Chichorro da Gama (c. 1800, Nazaré, Bahia – 10 June 1887, Rio de Janeiro) was a judge and politician of the Empire of Brazil.

Antônio graduated in law from the University of Coimbra. He was Juiz de Fora of Pitangui, Ilha Grande and Parati. He held the Presidency of several Provinces: Espírito Santo (1830), Alagoas (1832) and Pernambuco (1845 –1848). Called to the Government with the last Cabinet of the Permanent Triune Regency, he occupied the portfolios of Empire and Finance for three months (2 June – 7 October 1834) on an interim basis. In 1860, he was elevated to the post of Minister of the Supreme Court of Justice, a position from which he retired. He was also a senator (1865 – 1887), a position that was at that time an appointment for life.

== See also ==
- Praieira revolt

== Sources ==
- "Antonio Pinto Chichorro da Gama", Fazenda: Ministério da Fazenda, n.d.
