= Daniel Barbosa (politician) =

Brazilian politician (born 1984)

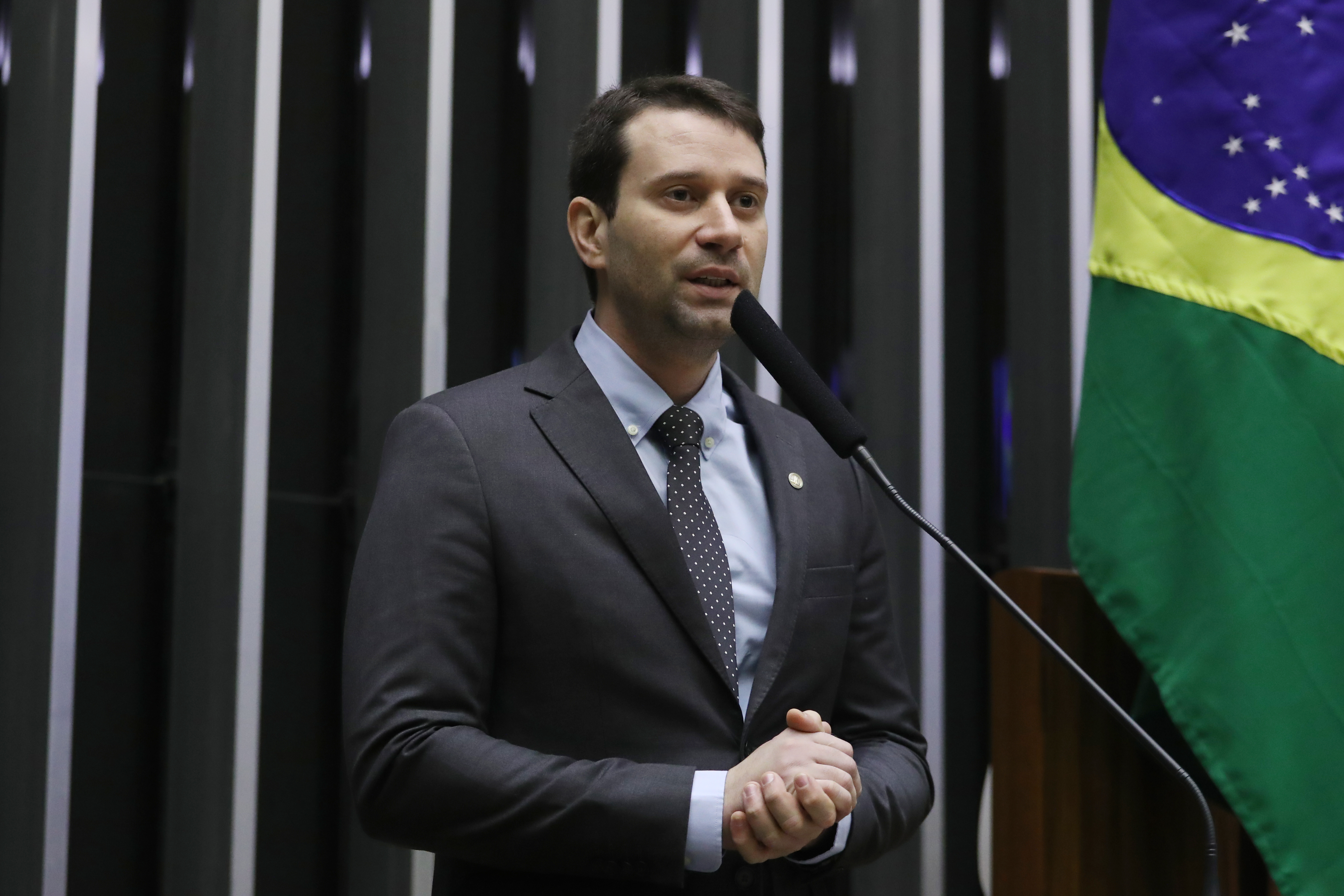
- Barbosa in 2023

Member of the Chamber of Deputies
- Incumbent
- Assumed office 1 February 2023
- Constituency: Alagoas

Personal details
- Born: Daniel Barbosa de Almeida Silva; 27 October 1984 (age 42) Maceió, Alagoas, Brazil
- Party: PP (since 2022)
- Other political affiliations: MDB (until 2022)
- Parent: Luciano Barbosa (father)

Daniel Barbosa de Almeida Silva (born 27 October 1984) is a Brazilian politician serving as a member of the Chamber of Deputies since 2023. He is the son of Luciano Barbosa.
