= Luciano Amaral (politician) =

Brazilian politician (born 1986)

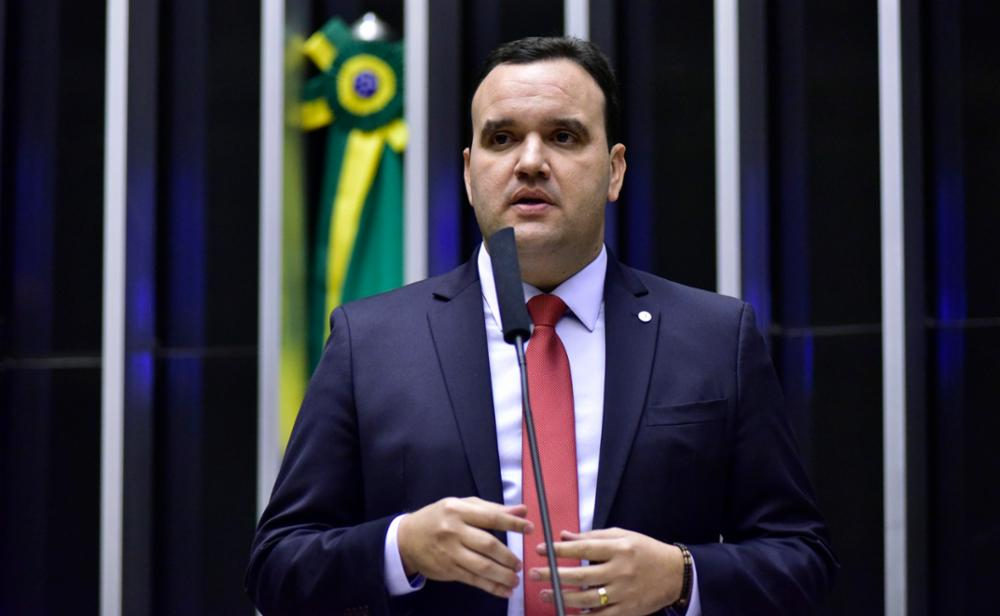
- Amaral in 2023

Member of the Chamber of Deputies
- Incumbent
- Assumed office 1 February 2023
- Constituency: Alagoas

Personal details
- Born: Luciano Suruagy do Amaral Filho; 27 June 1986 (age 40) Maceió, Alagoas
- Party: PSD (since 2025)
- Other political affiliations: PV (2022–2025)
- Profession: Cattle rancher

Luciano Suruagy do Amaral Filho (born 27 June 1986) is a Brazilian politician serving as a member of the Chamber of Deputies since 2023. He has served as president of the Social Democratic Party in Alagoas since 2025.
