= Marcelo Victor =

Brazilian politician (born 1979)

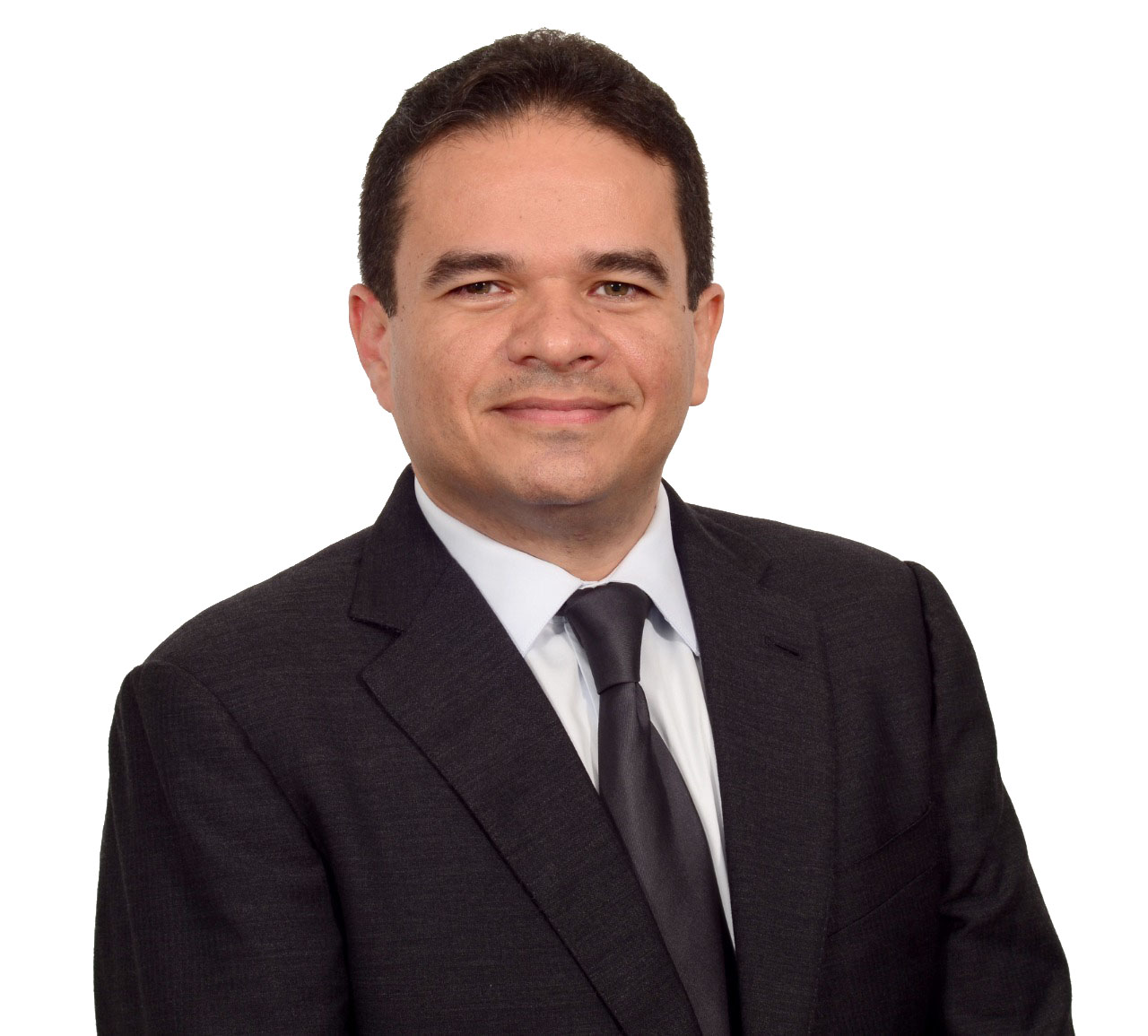

President of the Legislative Assembly of Alagoas
- Incumbent
- Assumed office 2 February 2019
- Preceded by: Luiz Dantas

Personal details
- Born: 4 September 1979 (age 46)
- Party: Brazilian Democratic Movement

Marcelo Victor Correia dos Santos (born 4 September 1979) is a Brazilian politician serving as a member of the Legislative Assembly of Alagoas since 2007. He has served as president of the assembly since 2019.
