= Legislative Assembly of Alagoas =

Legislative Assembly of the State of Alagoas Assembleia Legislativa do Estado de Alagoas
- 20th Legislature of the Legislative Assembly
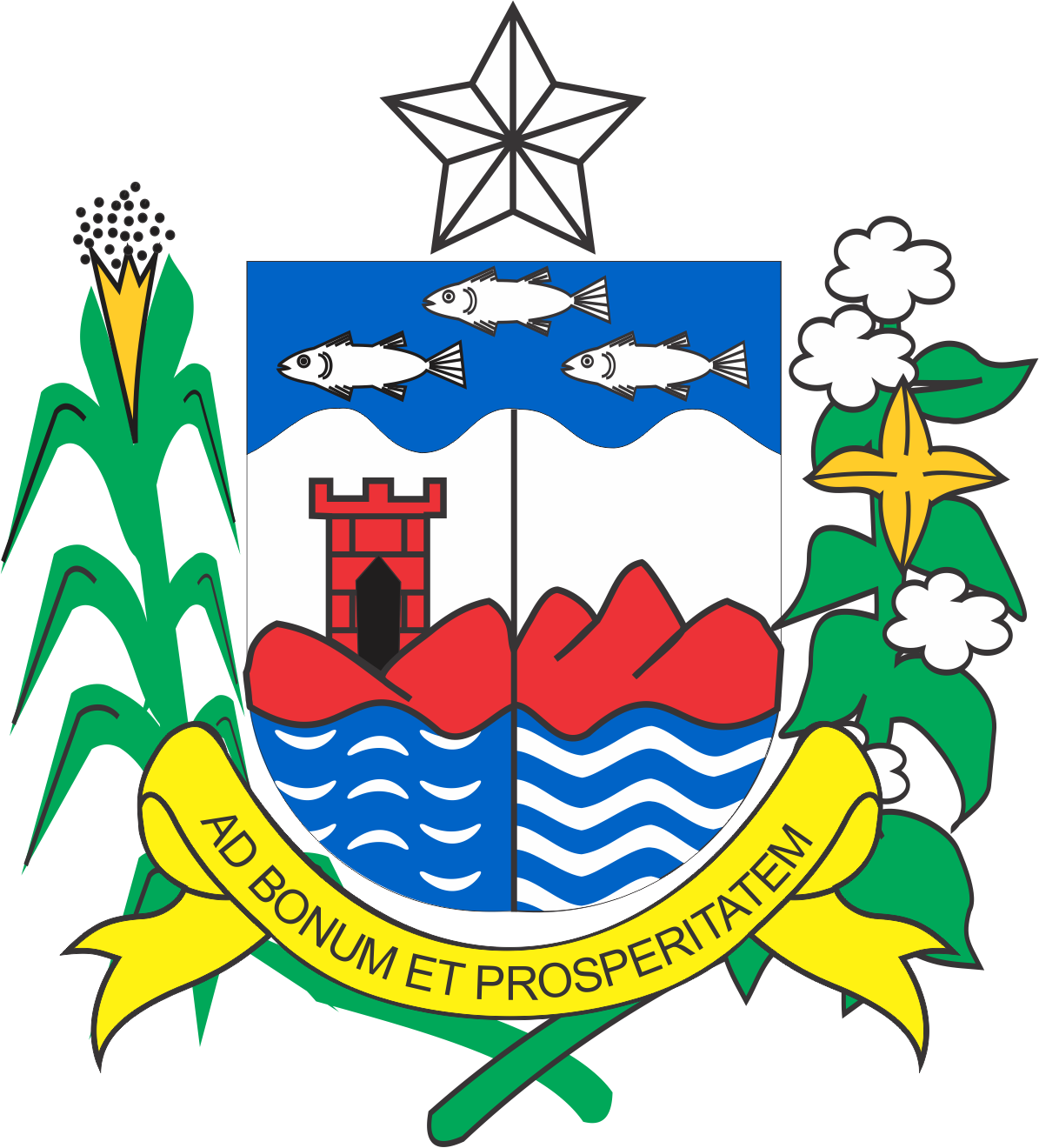

Type
- Type: Unicameral

History
- Founded: 28 March 1947
- New session started: 1 February 2022

Leadership
- President: Marcelo Victor, MDB since 2 February 2019

Structure
- Political groups: Government (22) PV (1) PT (3) MDB (18) (Note: One MLA, Bruno Toledo, resigned his position to be an advisor to the State Court of Auditors.) Opposition (8) UNIÃO (3) PP: (2) PL (1)
- Length of term: 4 years

Elections
- Voting system: Open list proportional representation
- Last election: 2 October 2022
- Next election: 4 October 2026

Meeting place
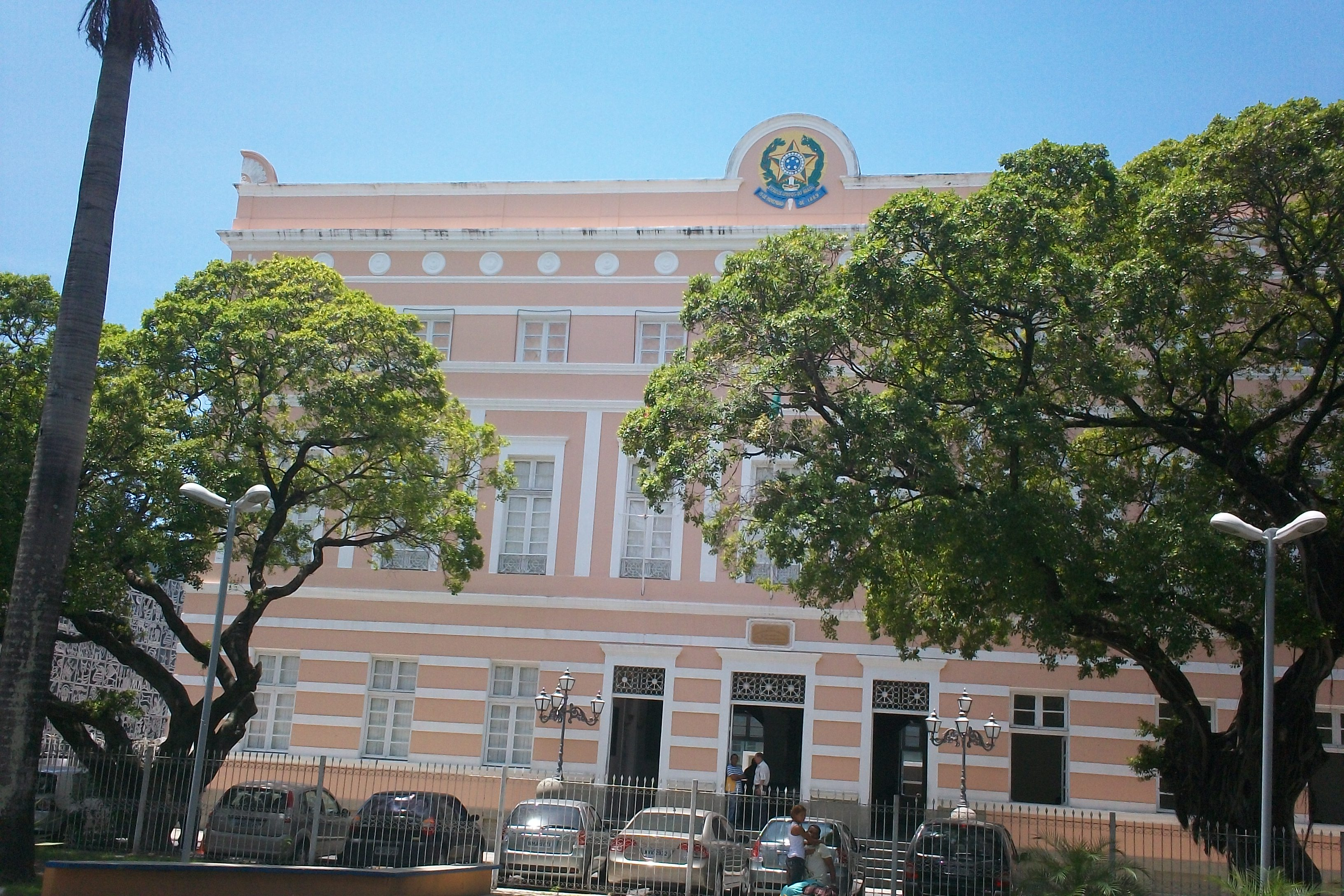
- Palácio Tavares Bastos, Maceió, Alagoas

Website
- www.al.al.leg.br

The Legislative Assembly of Alagoas (Portuguese: Assembleia Legislativa de Alagoas) is the unicameral legislative body of the government of the state of Alagoas in Brazil.

It consists of 27 state deputies. It is located in Maceió, Alagoas.
