= Eudócia Caldas =

Brazilian politician (born 1964)

- Official portrait

Senator for Alagoas
- Incumbent
- Assumed office 29 December 2024

Mayor of Ibateguara
- In office 1 January 2005 – 1 January 2013
- Vice Mayor: Geo Cruz
- Preceded by: Zé Valter
- Succeeded by: Geo Cruz

Personal details
- Born: 28 August 1964 (age 62) Ibateguara
- Party: PSDB (since 2026)
- Other political affiliations: PL (prior to 2006); PTN (2007–2013); SD (2013–2016); PSB (2016–2022); PL (2022–2026)
- Spouse: João Caldas
- Relatives: Dr. João (son); João Henrique Caldas (son)

Eudócia Maria Holanda de Araújo Caldas (born August 28, 1964 in Ibateguara) is a Brazilian physician, military police officer, and politician. Affiliated with the Brazilian Social Democracy Party (PSDB), she has been a senator for Alagoas since the resignation of Rodrigo Cunha (Podemos-AL) in December 2024.

== Biography ==
She has a medical degree and is a retired captain of the Alagoas Military Police and served as a legislative assistant in the Alagoas State Legislative Assembly for 36 years.

With Rodrigo Cunha (Podemos) elected as vice-mayor of Maceió, she assumed a seat in the Federal Senate. She was sworn in on 29 December 2024.

In March 2026 she, along with her son João Henrique Caldas, switched parties from the Liberal Party to the Brazilian Social Democracy Party.
