= 2010 Alagoas general election =

2010 Alagoas gubernatorial election
- October 3, 2010 (first round); October 31, 2010 (second round)
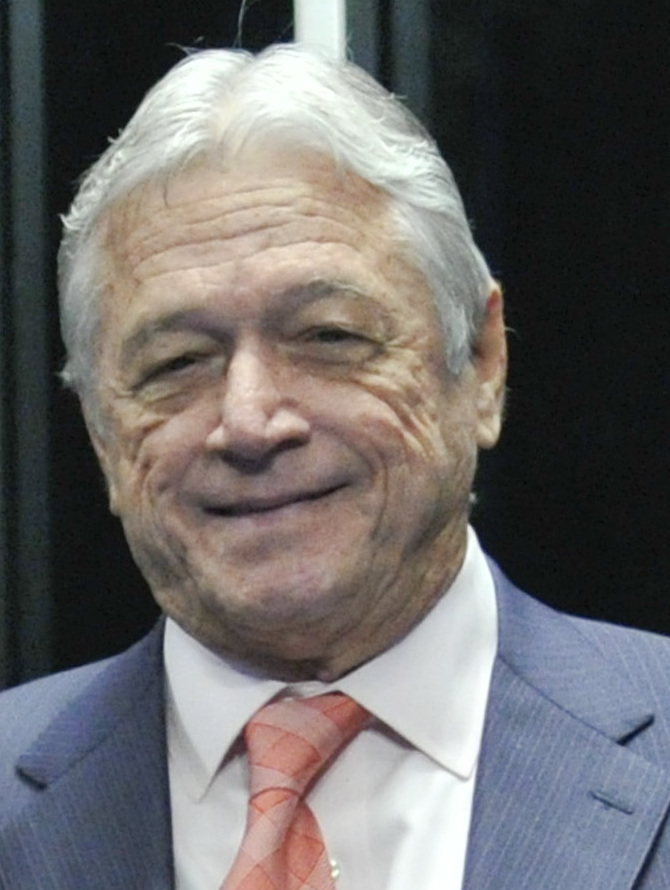

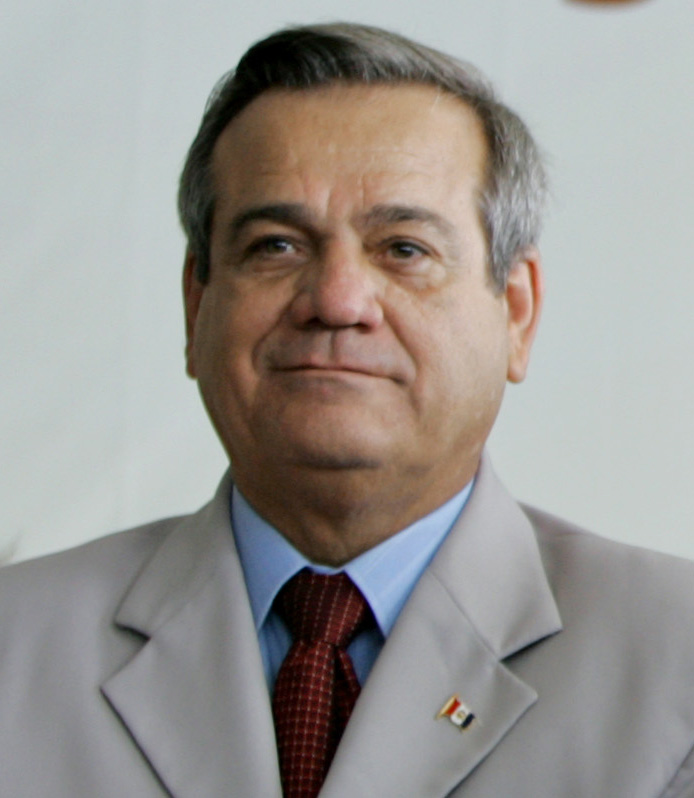

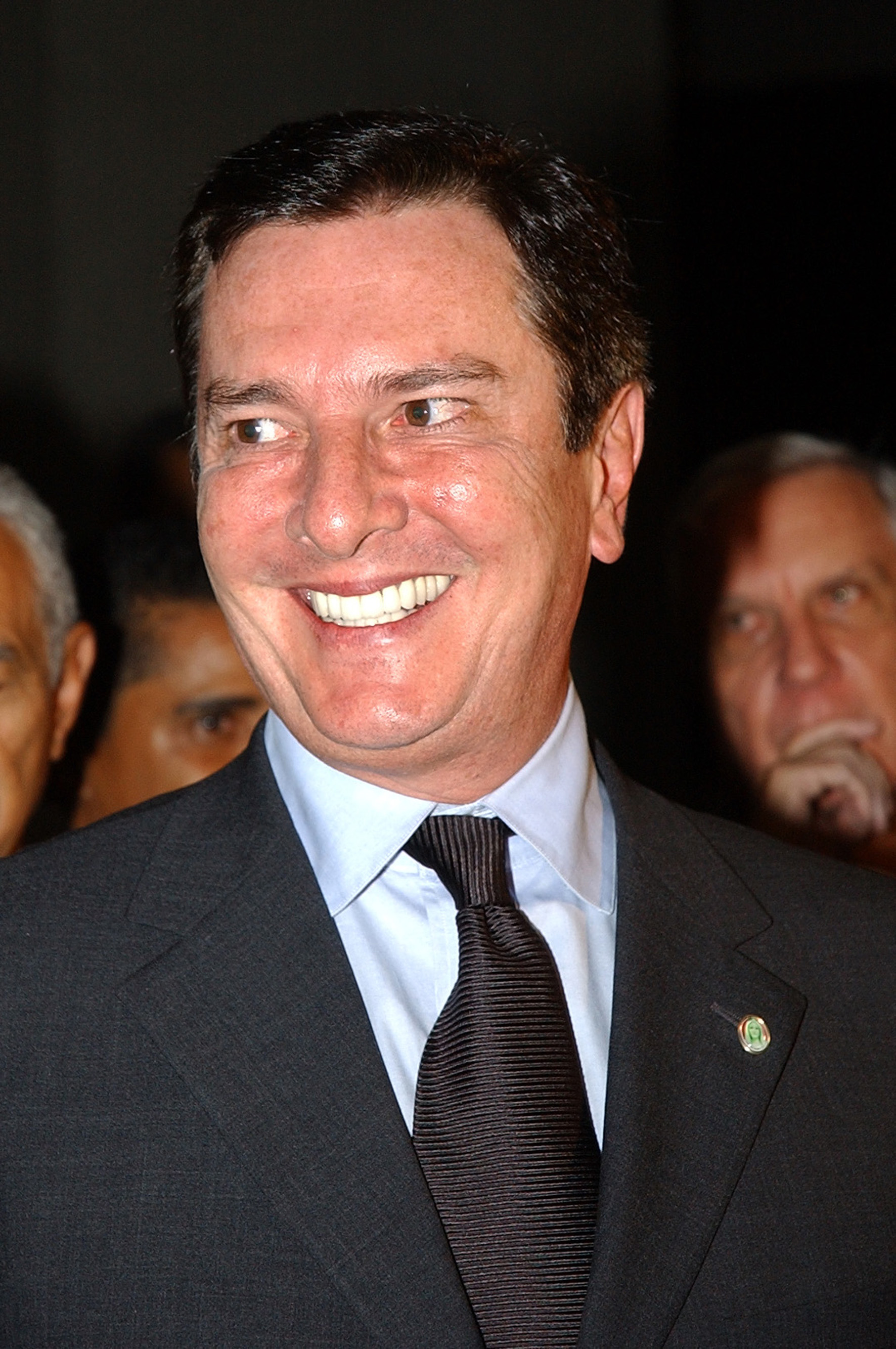
Nominee	Vilela Filho	Lessa	Collor
Party	PSDB	PDT	PTB
Running mate	José Thomaz Nonô	Joaquim Brito	Galba Novais
Popular vote	534,962 (1st); 712,789 (2nd)	394,155 (1st); 638,762 (2nd)	389,337 (1st)
Percentage	39.58% 52.74%	29.16% 47.26%	28.81%
Governor before election
Vilela Filho
PSDB
Elected Governor
Vilela Filho
PSDB

The Alagoas gubernatorial election was held on October 3, 2010, and October 31, 2010, to elect the next governor of Alagoas. Incumbent Governor Vilela Filho was running for reelection and won in a close runoff.

== Candidates ==
Candidate	Running mate	Coalition
Ronaldo Lessa; PDT	Joaquim Brito; PT	"Frente Popular Por Alagoas" (PDT, PT, PMDB, PR, PSDC, PRP, PCdoB, PTdoB)
Fernando Collor de Mello; PTB	Galba Novais; PRB	"O Povo no Governo" (PTB, PRB, PSL, PHS, PMN, PTC)
Tony Cloves; PCB	Luciene Maria; PCB	-
Jeferson Piones; PRTB	Eusves Plex; PRTB	"Renova Alagoas" (PRTB, PTN, PV)
Teotonio Vilela Filho; PSDB	José Thomaz Nonô; DEM	"Frente Pelo Bem de Alagoas" (PSDB, DEM, PP, PPS, PSC, PSB)
Mario Agra; PSOL	Mauricio Dias; PSOL	-
