= Rodrigo Cunha =

Brazilian senator

- Official portrait

Mayor of Maceió
- Incumbent
- Assumed office 5 April 2026
- Preceded by: João Henrique Caldas

Vice Mayor of Maceió
- In office 1 January 2025 – 4 April 2026
- Mayor: João Henrique Caldas
- Preceded by: Ronaldo Lessa (2023)

Senator for Alagoas
- In office 1 February 2019 – 29 December 2024

State Deputy of Alagoas
- In office 1 February 2015 – 31 January 2019
- Constituency: At-large

Personal details
- Born: 11 May 1981 (age 45) Arapiraca, Alagoas, Brazil
- Party: PODE (2023–present)
- Other political affiliations: PSDB (2013–2022); UNIÃO (2022-2023)
- Relatives: Ceci Cunha (mother)

Rodrigo Santos Cunha (born May 11, 1981), better known as Rodrigo Cunha, is a Brazilian politician and lawyer, who has served as Senator for Alagoas since 2019 for the Podemos party, which has an anti-corruption platform.

Cunha previously served as a member of the Legislative Assembly of Alagoas for the centrist Brazilian Social Democracy Party, before running a bid for the senate, noted by a striking independence from his party's coalition with the Alagoas politician and former president Fernando Collor de Mello, who was impeached in 1992 accused of corruption.

Cunha ran for governor in 2022 as a part of the big-tent Brazil Union party, losing in the second round to Paulo Dantas, but beating out Collor.

== Early life and education ==
Rodrigo Cunha was born on May 11, 1981 in Arapiraca, Alagoas to doctor and former Federal Deputy Ceci Cunha and businessman Juvenal Cunha.

In 1998, his mother, then a federal deputy along with his father and grandmother, were murdered in a shootout, the crime was ordered by his mother's deputy so that he could take on the position of federal deputy.

Cunha has degree in law from UFAL and a postgraduate degree in consumer law from UNIDERP.

=== Early career ===
He was Superintendent of PROCON of the State of Alagoas (2008-2015), Vice-President of the State Consumer Protection Council, Vice-President of the Brazilian Association of Procons (2013-2015) and member of the National Commission for Consumer Protection and Access to Justice.

== Political career ==
=== State deputy (2015-2019) ===
In the 2014 state elections, he was the best-voted state deputy in Alagoas, with 60,759 votes.

He was President of the Information Science and Technology Committee, vice-president of the Administration Committee and member of the Human Rights and Public Security Committee and the Transport, Communication, Services and Public Works Committee.

=== Senator (2019-2024) ===
Cunha has served as senator since 2019.

==== 2018 Alagoas state elections ====
In the 2018 state elections, he was elected senator for Alagoas, obtaining 895,738 votes, which corresponds to 34.42% of valid votes. Thus being the most voted Senator in his state.

Despite being elected as a member of the PSDB, he ran an independent campaign. At the beginning of the electoral race, he demonstrated dissatisfaction with the coalition made by his party with former president Fernando Collor for the dispute for state government and continued campaigning without associating his image with the party's majority ticket.

==== Tenure ====
In June 2019, he voted against the government's Weapons Decree, which made carrying and possession more flexible for citizens.

In February 2021, he was elected president of the Science, Technology, Innovation, Communication and IT Committee of the Federal Senate of Brazil for the 2021-2022 biennium.

Cunha joined the Brazil Union in 2022, before joining Podemos in 2023.

==== 2022 Alagoas gubernatorial election ====
In the 2022 elections, Rodrigo Cunha ran for state government, with state deputy Jó Pereira as his vice candidate. He went to the second round against the government candidate, Paulo Dantas. Although political names from the state who supported his candidacy, such as the mayor of Maceió, João Henrique Caldas and the president of the Chamber of Deputies, Arthur Lira, supported Jair Bolsonaro as a candidate for re-election to the presidency, Cunha did not publicly support any candidate, remaining in neutrality.

This strategy of neutrality was also employed by other Brazil Union candidates like Silvio Mendes in Piauí and ACM Neto in Bahia. Only one governor was elected in the Northeast who did not support Lula in the second round: Pernambuco's Raquel Lyra

On October 30, he was defeated in the dispute, having 47.67% of the votes against Dantas' 52.33%.

=== Mayor (2026–present) ===
After the incumbent mayor of Maceió João Henrique Caldas stepped down on 4 April 2026 to run for the post of governor in Alagoas, Cunha was promoted to the mayorship after having been Vice Mayor since the beginning of 2025.

== Personal life ==
Rodrigo Cunha separated in 2018 from Lavínia Cavalcanti, with whom he was married and had two children, João Juvenal, born in 2008, and Luna Ceci, born in 2011.

Since 2020 Cunha is in a relationship with singer Millane Hora. They got engaged at the carnival in Salvador in 2023 and on 9 September 2024 they announced that they were expecting their first child together. Their son Heitor was subsequently born in March 2025.

== Elections ==
Year	Election	Party	Office	Coalition	Partners	Party	Votes	Percent	Result	Ref.
2014	State Elections of Alagoas	PSDB	State Deputy	None			60,759	4.25%	Elected	
2018	State Elections of Alagoas	PSDB	Senator (Note: Caldas and Arruda were elected as alternates on the same ticket as Cunha.)	Alagoas with the people (PTC, PSDB, PP, PSB, PSC, DEM, PROS, PRB)	Eudócia Caldas	PSB	895,738	34.42%	Elected	
2018	State Elections of Alagoas	PSDB	Senator	Alagoas with the people (PTC, PSDB, PP, PSB, PSC, DEM, PROS, PRB)	Henrique Arruda	PROS	895,738	34.42%	Elected	
2022	State Elections of Alagoas	UNIÃO	Governor	Alagoas deserves more (UNIÃO, Always Forward (PSDB, Cidadania), PP, PSB)	Jó Pereira	PSDB	407,220	26.79%	Second Round	
2022	State Elections of Alagoas	UNIÃO	Governor	Alagoas deserves more (UNIÃO, Always Forward (PSDB, Cidadania), PP, PSB)	Jó Pereira	PSDB	759,984	47.67%	Lost	
2024	Mayoral Elections of Maceió	PODE	Vice-Mayor	The Force of Work (PL, PODE, UNIÃO, Always Forward (PSDB, Cidadania), PP, Republicanos)	JHC	PL	379,544	83.25%	Elected	

Political offices
Vacant Title last held by Ronaldo Lessa	Vice Mayor of Maceió; 2025–2026	Vacant
Preceded by João Henrique Caldas	Mayor of Maceió; 2026–present	Incumbent
