= Collor (surname) =

Collor is a surname. Notable people with the surname include:

- Fernando Collor de Mello (born 1949), Brazilian politician who served as the 32nd president of Brazil
- Lindolfo Collor (1890–1942), Brazilian journalist and politician
