= João Henrique Caldas =

Brazilian politician

- Official portrait, 2021

Governor-elect of Alagoas
- Assuming office 6 January 2027
- Lieutenant: Célia Rocha (elect)
- Succeeding: Paulo Dantas

Mayor of Maceió
- In office 1 January 2021 – 4 April 2026
- Deputy: Ronaldo Lessa (2021–2023); Vacant (2023–2025); Rodrigo Cunha (2025–2026)
- Preceded by: Rui Palmeira
- Succeeded by: Rodrigo Cunha

Member of the Chamber of Deputies
- In office 1 February 2011 – 1 January 2021
- Constituency: Alagoas

Member of the Legislative Assembly of Alagoas
- In office 1 February 2010 – 31 January 2011
- Constituency: At-large

Personal details
- Born: João Henrique Holanda Caldas; 22 July 1987 (age 39) Maceió, Alagoas, Brazil
- Party: PSDB (2026–present)
- Other political affiliations: PTN (2009–2013); SD (2013–2015); PSB (2015–2022); PL (2022–2026)
- Spouse: Marina Candia (m. 2022)
- Relatives: Dr. João (brother); Eudócia Caldas (mother); João Caldas (father)
- Profession: Lawyer

João Henrique Holanda Caldas (born 22 July 1987), often referred to as JHC, is a Brazilian politician and lawyer. He has spent his political career representing Alagoas, having served as federal deputy representative since 2011. He was the mayor of the capital Maceió from 2021–2026.

== Personal life ==
Caldas is the son of João Caldas da Silva and Eudócia Maria Holanda de Araújo. His parents are also a politicians, having served in the chamber of deputies and in the Federal Senate. He is an alumnus of the Centro Universitário Cesmac (CESMAC). Caldas is a member of the neo-Pentecostal church Igreja Internacional da Graça de Deus. Caldas has also worked as a lawyer.

== Political career ==
In the 2009 local elections Caldas was elected to the legislative assembly of Alagoas. In the following year in the 2010 Brazilian general election Caldas was elected to the federal senate.

Caldas voted in favor of the impeachment motion of then-president Dilma Rousseff. Caldas voted against the 2017 Brazilian labor reform, and would vote in favor of opening a corruption investigation into Rousseff's successor Michel Temer.

After an unsuccessful bid for mayor of Maceió in 2016, he ran again in the 2020 mayoral election as the PSB candidate. In the first round of voting he came second with 28,56% of the votes, which qualified him for the runoff election. In the runoff he faced Alfredo Gaspar of the MDB and won with 58,64% of the votes.

In October 2022, during the lead-up to the presidential runoff election between Lula and Jair Bolsonaro, Caldas changed his party membership from the PSB, the party of Lulas running mate Geraldo Alckmin, to Bolsonaros Liberal Party and endorsed his campaign. Bolsonaro hoped that this change would help him gain votes in Alagoas and the entire Northeast Region, which were firm Lula strongholds in the first election round.

In 2024 he stood for re-election as mayor of Maceió for the Liberal Party. He already got re-elected in the first voting round with 83,25%, a record for the highest voting percentage received in the history of Maceió mayoral elections.

Caldas announced his departure from the Liberal Party in March 2026, citing being overlooked for higher offices as the main reason. Immediately following his departure he announced that he joined the PSDB where he will run for governor in the 2026 Alagoas general election. With this announcement he also stepped down as mayor of Maceió, which promoted vice mayor Rodrigo Cunha to that position. Luciana Santana, professor of political sciences at the Federal University of Alagoas, argued that his switch of political parties was a largely strategical move, due to the state of Alagoas as a whole being predominantly left-leaning. Therefore Caldas had to break ties with Bolsonaros party and move closer to the center to improve his chances of governorship.

Political offices
Preceded by Rui Palmeira	Mayor of Maceió; 2021–2026	Succeeded by Rodrigo Cunha
Preceded by Paulo Dantas	Governor of Alagoas; Taking office 2027	Elect
