= List of mayors of Maceió =

The following is a list of mayors of the city of Maceió, in Alagoas state, Brazil.

- Ricardo Brennand Monteiro, 1890
- Napoleão Goulart, 1890
- Manoel Eugênio do Prado, 1890-1891
- Antônio Pereira Caldas, 1891
- Joaquim José de Araújo Lima Rocha, 1891-1892, 1894-1897
- Bonifácio Magalhães da Silveira, 1892
- Antônio Francisco Leite Pindaíba, 1892-1894
- Clarêncio da Silva Jucá, 1897-1899
- Antônio José Duarte, 1899-1901
- José de Barros Wanderley de Mendonça, 1901-1903
- Joaquim José de Araújo, 1903-1904
- José Rodi Braga, 1904
- Cândido de Almeida Botelho, 1904-1905
- Manoel Sampaio Marques, 1905-1907
- Antonio Guedes Nogueira, 1907-1909
- Demócrito Brandão Gracindo, 1909-1911
- Luís de Mascarenhas, 1911
- Roberto Otaviano de Sousa Machado, 1911-1913
- Firmino de Aquino Vasconcelos, 1913-1915
- Ignácio Uchôa d’Albuquerque Sarmento, 1915-1917
- Firmino de Aquino Vasconcelos, 1917-1920, 1921-1924
- Leôncio Correa de Oliveira, 1920-1921
- Ernani Teixeira Basto, 1924
- Crisanto de Carvalho, 1924-1925
- José Moreira da Silva Lima, 1925-1927
- Jaime de Altavila, 1927-1928
- Ernandi Teixeira Bastos, 1928
- José Carneiro de Albuquerque, 1928-1930
- António Baltazar de Mendonça, 1930-1933
- Orlando Valeriano de Araújo, 1933
- Alfredo Elias da Rosa Oiticica, 1933-1934
- Edgar de Góes Monteiro, 1934-1935
- Álvaro Guedes Nogueira, 1935
- Cipriano Jucá, 1935
- Afonso da Rocha Lira, 1935-1937
- Eustáquio Gomes de Melo, 1937-1941
- Francisco Abdon Arroxelas, 1941-1945
- Antônio Maria Mafra, 1945
- Reinaldo Carlos de Carvalho Gama, 1945-1948
- João Teixeira de Vasconcelos, 1948-1950
- Luiz Campos Teixeira, 1950-1951
- Joaquim de Barros Leão, 1951-1952
- Abelardo Pontes Lima, 1952-1953, 1955-1960
- José Lucena de Albuquerque Maranhão, 1953-1955
- Cleto Marques Luz, 1955
- Manoel Valente de Lima, 1960-1961
- Sandoval Ferreira Caju, 1961-1964
- Vinícius Cansanção Filho, 1964-1966
- Divaldo Suruagy, 1966-1970
- Henrique Equelman, 1970-1971
- Juvêncio Calheiros Lessa, 1971
- João Rodrigues Sampaio Filho, 1971-1975, 1990-1992
- Dílton Falcão Simões, 1975-1979
- Fernando Collor, 1979-1982
- Corintho Onélio Campelo da Paz, 1982-1983
- José Bandeira de Medeiros, 1983-1985
- Djalma Falcão, 1986-1988
- Guilherme Palmeira, 1989-1990
- Pedro Vieira da Silva, 1992
- Ronaldo Lessa, 1993-1996
- Kátia Born, 1997-2004
- Cícero Almeida, 2005-2012
- Rui Palmeira, 2013-2020
- João Henrique Caldas, 2021-2026
- Rodrigo Cunha, 2026-present

== See also ==
- Maceió history (in Portuguese)
- Alagoas history (state)
- History of Alagoas (state)
- List of mayors of largest cities in Brazil (in Portuguese)
- List of mayors of capitals of Brazil (in Portuguese)
