= Fernando Collor de Mello =

President of Brazil from 1990 to 1992

Fernando Collor de Mello GCTE
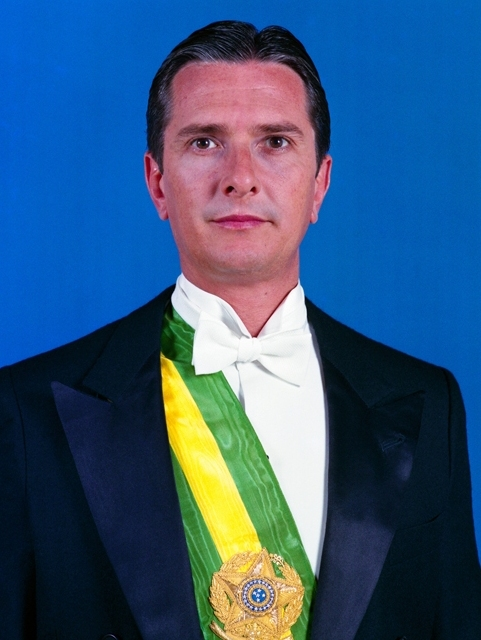
- Official portrait, 1992

32nd President of Brazil
- In office 15 March 1990 – 29 December 1992; Suspended powers and duties 2 October 1992 – 29 December 1992
- Vice President: Itamar Franco
- Preceded by: José Sarney
- Succeeded by: Itamar Franco

Senator for Alagoas
- In office 1 August 2019 – 1 February 2023
- Preceded by: Renilde Bulhões
- Succeeded by: Renan Filho
- In office 1 February 2007 – 1 April 2019
- Preceded by: Heloísa Helena
- Succeeded by: Renilde Bulhões

Governor of Alagoas
- In office 15 March 1987 – 14 May 1989
- Vice Governor: Moacir de Andrade
- Preceded by: José Tavares
- Succeeded by: Moacir de Andrade

Member of the Chamber of Deputies
- In office 1 February 1983 – 15 July 1986
- Constituency: Alagoas

Mayor of Maceió
- In office 1 January 1979 – 1 January 1983
- Preceded by: Dílton Simões
- Succeeded by: Corinto Campelo

Personal details
- Born: 12 August 1949 (age 77) Rio de Janeiro, Federal District, Brazil
- Party: PRD (2023–present)
- Other political affiliations: See list: ARENA (1979); PDS (1980–1985); PMDB (1986–1988); PRN (1989–1992); PRTB (1999–2006); PTB (2007–2016); PTC (2016–2019); PROS (2019–2022); PTB (2022–2023)
- Spouses: Celi Elisabete Júlia "Lilibeth" Monteiro de Carvalho (m. 1975; div. 1981) Rosane Brandão Malta (m. 1981; div. 2005) Caroline Serejo Medeiros (m. 2006)
- Children: 5
- Parent(s): Arnon de Melo; Leda Collor
- Relatives: Ada Mello (cousin)
- Education: University of Brasília

Fernando Affonso Collor de Mello (Brazilian Portuguese: [feʁˈnɐ̃dwaˈfõsu ˈkɔloʁ dʒi ˈmɛlu]; born 12 August 1949) is a Brazilian politician who served as the 32nd president of Brazil from 1990 to 1992, when he resigned in a failed attempt to stop his impeachment trial by the Brazilian Senate. Collor was the first president democratically elected after the end of the Brazilian military dictatorship. He became the youngest president in Brazilian history, taking office at the age of 40. After he resigned from the presidency, the impeachment trial on charges of corruption continued. Collor was found guilty by the Senate and disqualified from holding elected office for eight years (1992–2000). He was later acquitted of ordinary criminal charges in his judicial trial before Brazil's Supreme Federal Court, for lack of valid evidence.

Fernando Collor was born into a political family. He is the son of the former Senator Arnon Affonso de Farias Mello and Leda Collor (daughter of former Labour Minister Lindolfo Collor, led by his father, former governor of Alagoas and proprietor of the Arnon de Mello Organization, a media conglomerate which manages the state-wide television station TV Gazeta de Alagoas, the affiliate of TV Globo in the state.) "Collor" is a Portuguese adaptation of the German surname Köhler, from his maternal grandfather Lindolfo Leopoldo Boeckel Collor.

His time as president was marked by the implementation of the "Collor Plan", the launch of a national privatization program, and the opening of the domestic market to imports, which had a significant impact on the growth of the consumer car market. The plan, initially well-received, ultimately deepened the economic recession, exacerbated by the elimination of over 920,000 jobs in 1990; in addition, allegations of political corruption involving Collor's treasurer, Paulo César Farias, made by his brother Pedro Collor de Mello, led to an impeachment process against him. Before the process could be finalized, the president resigned on 29 December 1992, handing over the position to his vice president, Itamar Franco, just hours before being convicted by the Federal Senate for crimes of responsibility, resulting in the loss of his political rights for eight years. During his presidency, he signed the Treaty of Asunción in 1991, the founding document of the Southern Common Market (Mercosur). He merged IAPAS and INPS, creating the current federal agency, the National Social Security Institute (INSS). He led the proceedings of the "Earth Summit" at ECO-92. He also officially approved the demarcation of the Yanomami Indigenous Territory.

Later, after some time living in obscurity, Collor served as Senator for Alagoas from February 2007 to February 2023. He first won election in 2006 and was reelected in 2014. In August 2017, Collor was accused by Brazil's Supreme Federal Court of receiving around US$9 million in bribes between 2010 and 2014 from Petrobras subsidiary BR Distributor. On 24 April 2025, his immediate arrest was ordered to serve his sentence by the Supreme Court justice Alexandre de Moraes. In the early hours of 25 April, he was arrested by the Brazilian Federal Police.

== Early career ==
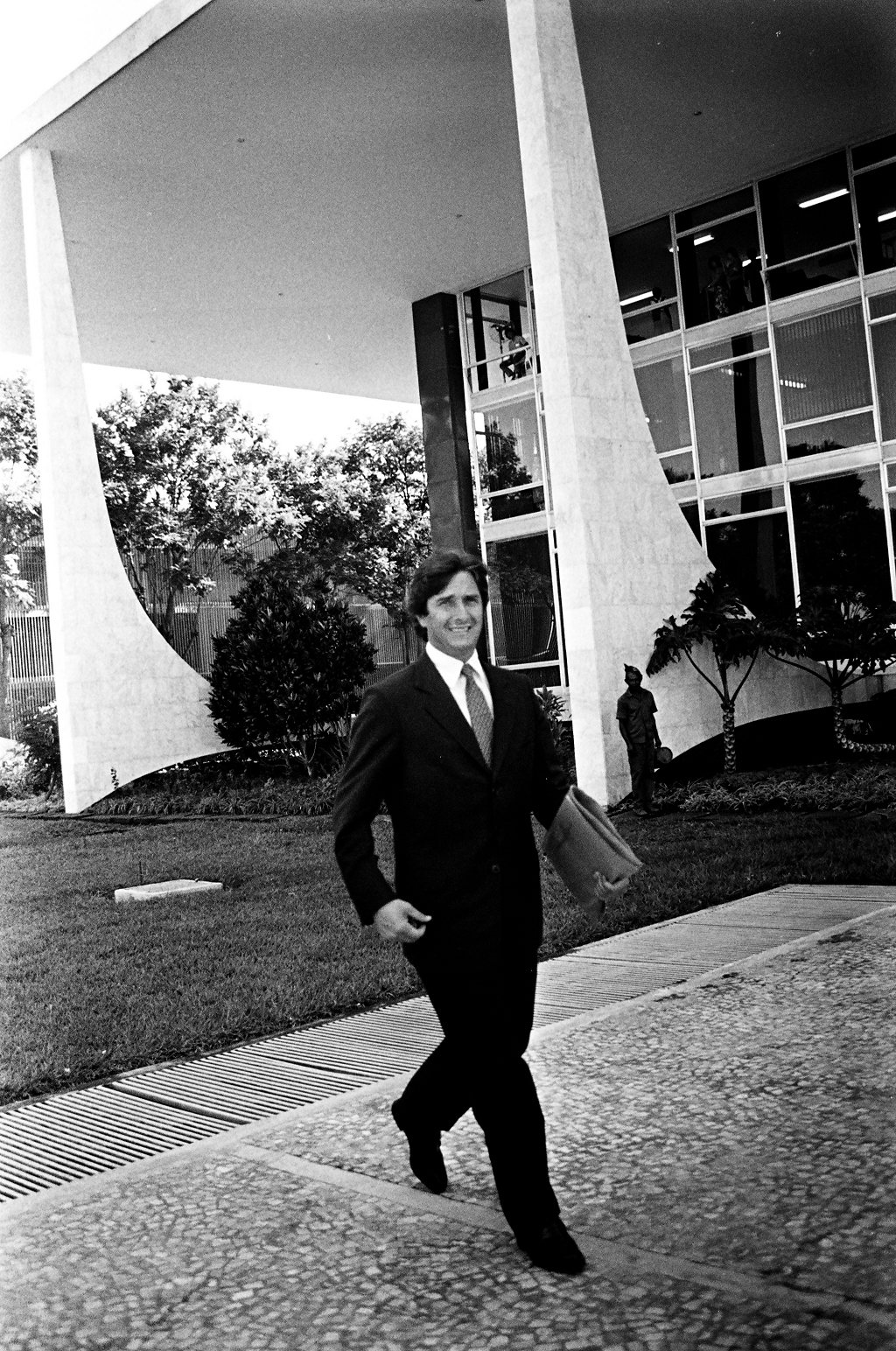
Collor in 1988

Fernando Collor was born on 12 August 1949, to Leda Collor and Arnon Afonso de Farias Mello, in a very affluent and politically well-connected family. His father was governor and later senator for the state of Alagoas. He has two brothers, Pedro and Leopoldo, and two sisters, Ledinha and Ana. His grandfather, Lindolfo Collor, was a direct descendant of some of the first German immigrants that arrived in Brazil in 1824. Despite being born in Rio de Janeiro, Fernando spent his childhood in the cities of Maceió, Rio de Janeiro and Brasília.

Collor graduated in economic sciences, in 1972, at the Federal University of Alagoas. That same year, he become president of the Gazeta de Alagoas, a newspaper that was run by his family's media conglomerate. In 1975, he married his first wife Celi Elisabete Júlia Monteiro de Carvalho, with whom he had two children. He married a second time, with Rosane Malta (who would become the First Lady) in 1984. No children were born from this union. In 2006, he married Caroline Medeiros, with whom he would have two children. He also had a child born out of wedlock.

Collor became president of Brazilian football club Centro Sportivo Alagoano (CSA) in 1976. After entering politics, he was successively named mayor of Alagoas' capital Maceió in 1979 (National Renewal Alliance Party), elected a federal deputy (Democratic Social Party) in 1982, and eventually elected governor of the small Northeastern state of Alagoas (Brazilian Democratic Movement Party) in 1986.

During his tenure as governor, he gained national attention for his purported efforts to challenge high salaries among public servants, whom he referred to as marajás (maharajas) (likening them to the former princes of India who received a stipend from the government as compensation for relinquishing their lands). The effectiveness of his policies in reducing public expenses remains a subject of debate. However, his stance on the issue significantly increased his popularity across the country, bolstered by appearances on nationally televised broadcasts—an unusual platform for a governor from a smaller state like Alagoas.

Although he gained national prominence as governor of Alagoas and positioned himself as an anti-corruption and anti-establishment candidate for the presidency, his career was marred by corruption scandals dating back to his tenure as mayor of Maceió. Earlier in his life, when he was a Federal Deputy in the National Congress, Collor was regarded as a relatively low-profile politician, primarily proposing legislation that appeared to favor his family's business interests.

== Presidency (1990–1992) ==
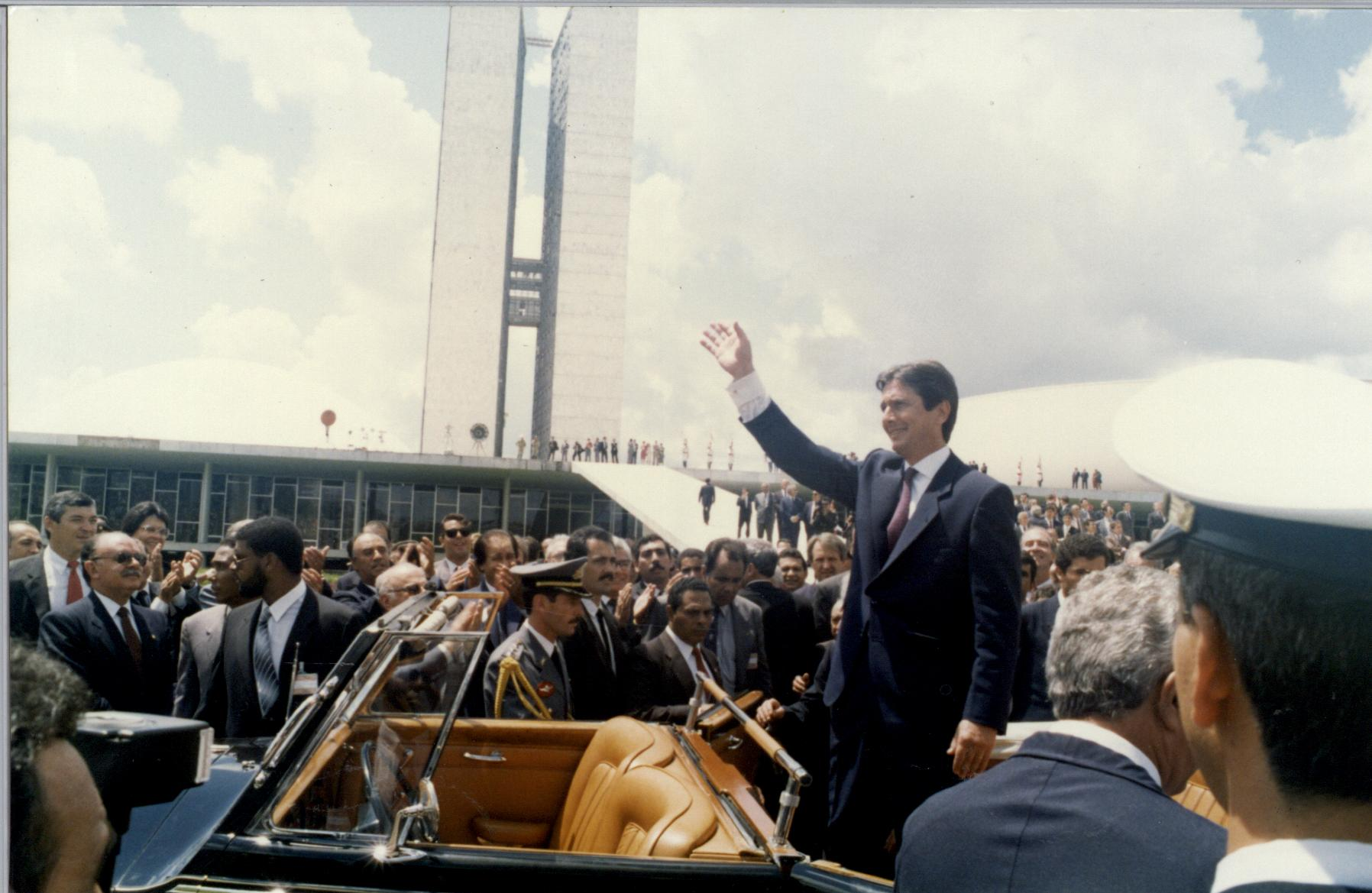
Collor on Inauguration Day, 15 March 1990

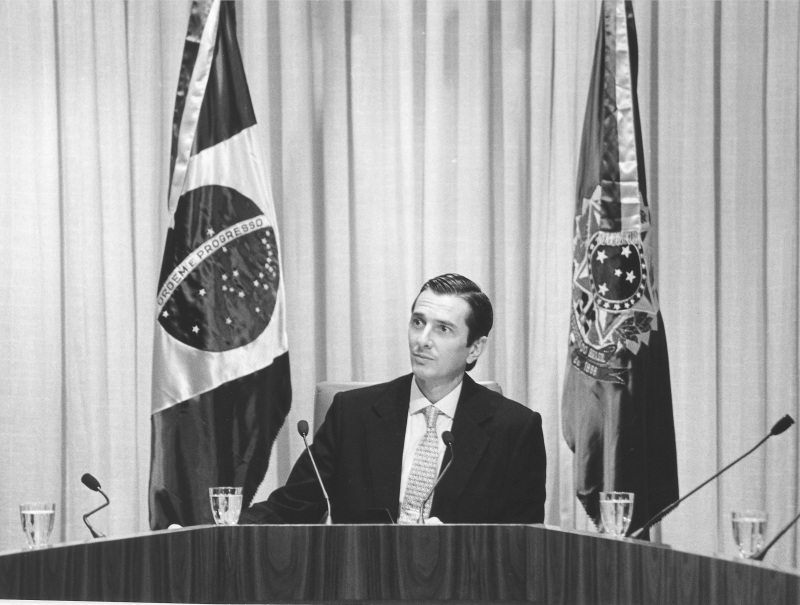
Collor during a meeting at the Planalto Palace, 1990

In 1989 Collor defeated Luiz Inácio Lula da Silva in a controversial two-round presidential race with 35 million votes. In December 1989, days prior to the second round, businessman Abílio Diniz was the victim of a sensational political kidnapping. The act was asserted by some to be an attempt to sabotage Lula's chances of victory by associating the kidnapping with the left wing. At the time, Brazilian law barred any party from addressing the media on the days prior to election day. Lula's party thus had no opportunity to clarify the accusations that the party (PT) was involved in the kidnapping. Collor won in the state of São Paulo against many prominent political figures. The first president of Brazil elected by popular vote in 29 years, Collor spent the early years of his presidency battling inflation, which at times reached rates of 25% a month.

The very day he took office, Collor launched the Plano Collor (Collor Plan), implemented by his finance minister Zélia Cardoso de Mello (not related to Collor). The plan attempted to reduce the money supply by forcibly converting large portions of consumer bank accounts into non-cashable government bonds, while at the same time increasing the printing of money bills, a counterbalancing measure to combat hyper-inflation.

=== Free trade, privatization and state reforms ===
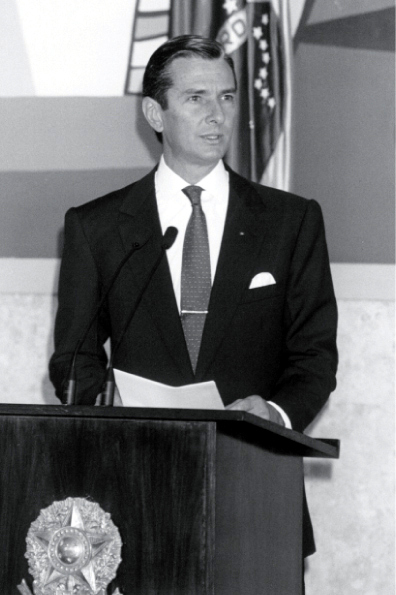
Collor speaking at the Planalto presidential palace, 1991

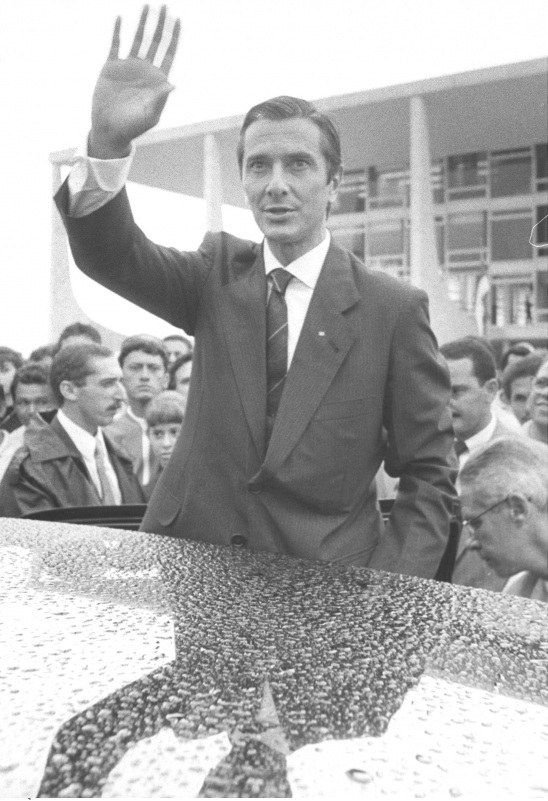
Collor waves to the people

Under Zélia's tenure as Brazil's Minister of Finances, the country had a period of major changes, featuring what ISTOÉ magazine called an "unprecedented revolution" in many levels of public administration: "privatization, opening its market to free trade, encouraging industrial modernization, temporary control of the hyper-inflation and public debt reduction."

In the month before Collor took power, hyperinflation was at 90 percent per month and climbing. All accounts over 50,000 cruzeiros (about US$500 at that time), were frozen for several weeks. He also proposed freezes in wages and prices, as well as major cuts in government spending. The measures were received unenthusiastically by the people, though many felt that radical measures were necessary to kill the hyperinflation. Within a few months, however, inflation resumed, eventually reaching rates of 10 percent a month.

During the course of his government, Collor was accused of condoning an influence peddling scheme. The accusations weighed on the government and led Collor and his team to an institutional crisis leading to a loss of credibility that reached the finance minister, Zélia.

This political crisis had negative consequences on his ability to carry out his policies and reforms. The Plano Collor I, under Zélia would be renewed with the implementation of the Plano Collor II; the government's loss of prestige would make that follow-up plan short-lived and largely ineffective. The failure of Zélia and Plano Collor I led to their substitution by Marcílio Marques Moreira and his Plano Collor II. Moreira's plan tried to correct some aspects of the first plan, but it was too late. Collor's administration was paralyzed by the fast deterioration of his image, through a succession of corruption accusations.

During the Plano Collor, yearly inflation was at first reduced from 30,000 percent in 1990 (Collor's first year in government) to 400 percent in 1991, but then climbed back up to 1,020 percent in 1992 (when he left office). Inflation continued to rise to 2,294 percent in 1994 (two years after he left office). Although Zélia acknowledged later that the Plano Collor didn't end inflation, she also stated: "It is also possible to see with clarity that, under very difficult conditions, we promoted the balancing of the national debt – and that, together with the commercial opening, it created the basis for the implementation of the Plano Real."

Parts of Collor's free trade and privatization program were followed by his successors: Itamar Franco (Collor's running mate) even when he rejected privatization ideological, Fernando Henrique Cardoso (a member of the Franco cabinet) and Lula da Silva. Collor's administration privatized 15 different companies (including Acesita), and began the process of privatizing several others, such as Embraer, Telebrás and Companhia Vale do Rio Doce. Some members of Collor's government were also part of the later Cardoso administration in different or similar functions:

- Pedro Malan
- Renan Calheiros (PMDB-AL)
- Antônio Kandir (PSDB-SP)
- Pratini de Moraes
- Celso Lafer
- Reinhold Stephanes
- Armínio Fraga
- Pedro Parente

Luiz Carlos Bresser-Pereira, a minister in the previous Sarney and the following Fernando Henrique Cardoso administrations, stated that "Collor changed the political agenda in the country, because he implemented brave and very necessary reforms, and he pursued fiscal adjustments. Although other attempts had been made since 1987, it was during Collor's administration that old statist ideas were confronted and combated (...) by a brave agenda of economic reforms geared towards free trade and privatization." According to Philippe Faucher, professor of political science at McGill University, the combination of the political crisis and the hyperinflation continued to reduce Collor's credibility and in that political vacuum an impeachment process took place, precipitated by Pedro Collor's (Fernando Collor's brother) accusations and other social and political sectors which thought they would be harmed by his policies.

=== Awards ===
In 1991, UNICEF chose three health programs: community agents, lay midwives and eradication of measles as the best in the world. These programs were promoted during Collor's administration. Until 1989, the Brazilian vaccination record, was considered the worst in South America. During Collor's administration, Brazil's vaccination program won a United Nations prize, as the best in South America. Collor's project Minha Gente (My People) won the UN award Project Model for the Humanity in 1993.

=== Corruption charges and impeachment ===
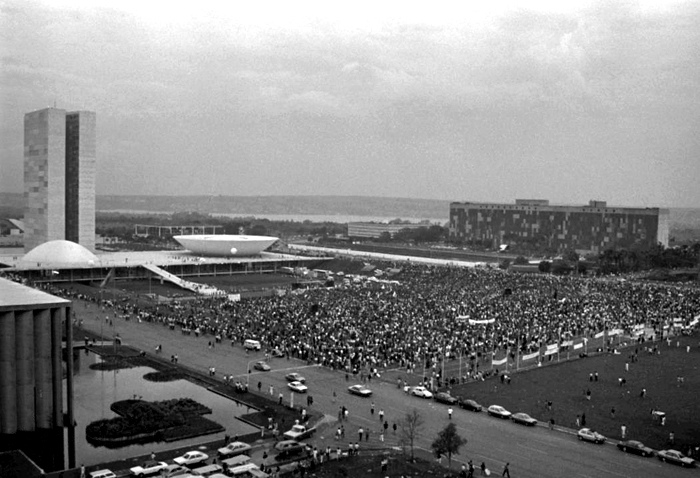
Protesters call for Collor's impeachment in front of the National Congress in September 1992

In May 1992, Fernando Collor's brother Pedro Collor accused him of condoning an influence peddling scheme run by his campaign treasurer, Paulo Cesar Farias. The Federal Police and the Federal Prosecution Service opened an investigation. On 1 July 1992, a Joint Parliamentary Commission of Inquiry, composed of senators and members of the Chamber of Deputies, formed in Congress to investigate the accusation and review the evidence uncovered by police and federal prosecutors. Senator Amir Lando was chosen as the rapporteur of the Commission of Inquiry, chaired by Congressman Benito Gama. Farias, Pedro Collor, government officials and others were subpoenaed and gave depositions before it. Some weeks later, with the investigation progressing and under fire, Collor asked on national television for the people's support in going out in the street and protesting against "coup" forces. On 11 August 1992, thousands of students organized by the National Union of Students (União Nacional dos Estudantes – UNE), protested on the street against Collor. Their faces, often painted in a mixture of the colors of the flag and protest-black, lead to them being called "Caras-pintadas" ("Painted Faces").

On 26 August 1992, the final congressional inquiry was approved 16–5. The report concluded that there was proof that Fernando Collor had had personal expenses paid for by money raised by Paulo Cesar Farias through his influence peddling scheme.

As a result, a petition to the Chamber of Deputies by citizens Barbosa Lima Sobrinho and Marcelo Lavenère Machado, respectively the then president of the Brazilian Press Association and the then-president of the Brazilian Bar Association formally accused Collor of crimes of responsibility (the Brazilian equivalent of "high crimes and misdemeanors", such as abuse of power) warranting removal from office per the constitutional and legal norms for impeachment. In Brazil, a formal petition for impeachment of the president must be submitted by one or more private citizens, not by corporations or public institutions. The formal petition, submitted on 1 September 1992, began impeachment proceedings. The Chamber of Deputies set up a special committee on 3 September 1992 to study the impeachment petition. On 24 September 1992, the committee voted (32 votes in favour, one vote against, one abstention) to approve the impeachment petition and recommend that the full Chamber of Deputies accept the charges of impeachment. Under the Constitution of Brazil, the impeachment process required two thirds of the Chamber of Deputies to vote to allow the charges of impeachment to be escalated to the Senate. On 29 September 1992, Collor was impeached by the Chamber of Deputies, with more than two thirds of its members concurring. In the decisive roll call vote, 441 deputies voted for and 38 deputies voted against the admission of the charges of impeachment.

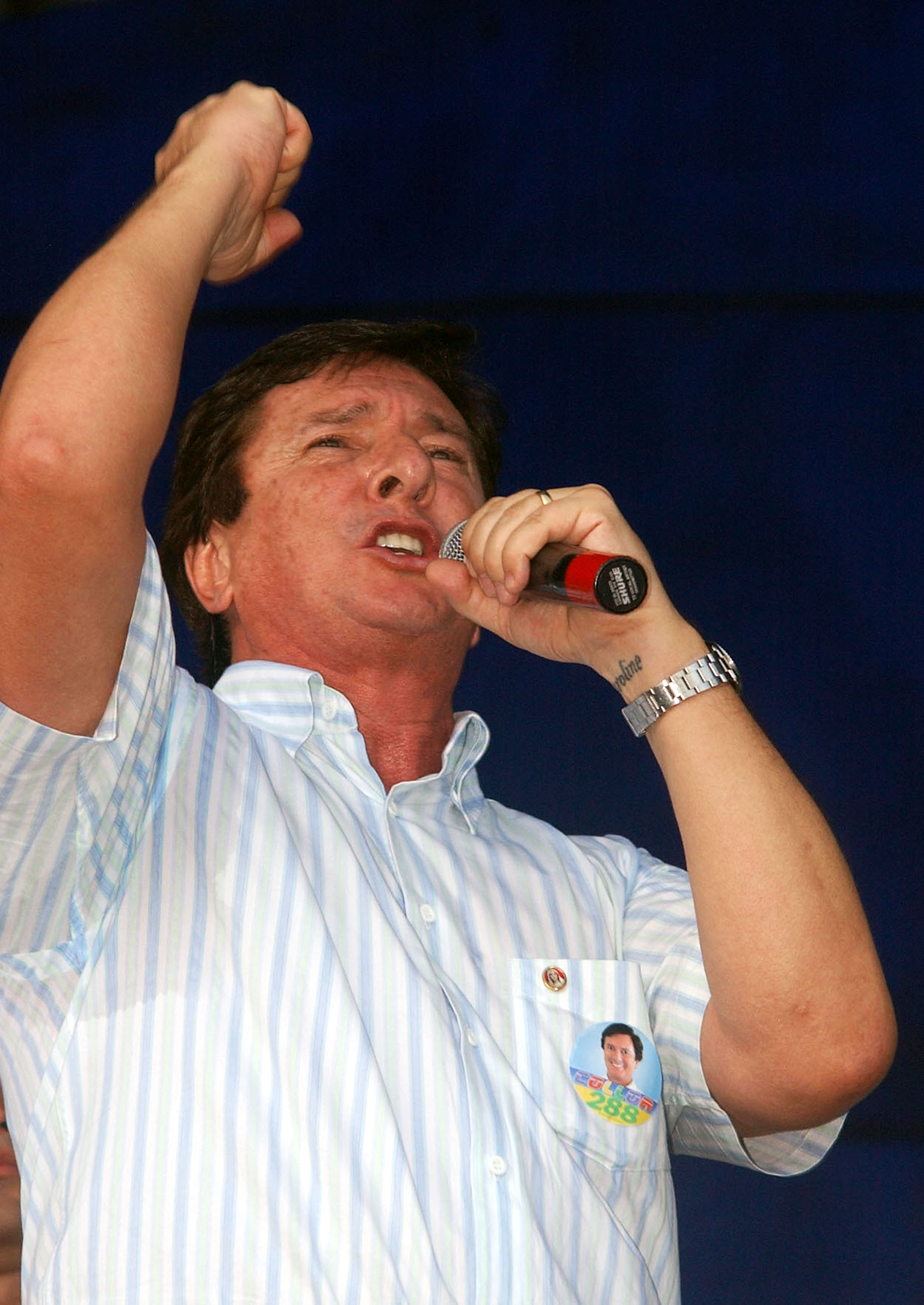
Collor campaigning for Senate in Maceió, 2006

On 30 September 1992, the accusation was formally sent from the Chamber of Deputies to the Senate, and proceedings for impeachment began in the upper house. The Senate formed a committee to examine the case file and determine whether all legal formalities had been followed. The Committee issued its report, recognizing that the charges of impeachment had been presented in accordance with the Constitution and the laws, and proposed that the Senate organize itself into a court of impeachment to conduct the trial of the president. On 1 October 1992, this report was presented on the floor of the Senate, and the full Senate voted to accept it and to proceed. That day the then-president of the Federal Supreme Court, Justice Sydney Sanches, was notified of the opening of the trial process in the Senate, and began to preside over the process. On 2 October 1992, Collor received a formal summons from the Brazilian Senate notifying him that the Senate had accepted the report, and that he was now a defendant in an impeachment trial. Per the Constitution of Brazil, upon receipt of that writ of summons, Collor's presidential powers were suspended for 180 days, and vice president Itamar Franco became acting president. The Senate also sent an official communication to the office of the vice-president to formally acquaint him of the suspension of the president, and to give him notice that he was now the acting president.

By the end of December, it was obvious that Collor would be convicted and removed from office by the Senate. In hopes of staving this off, Collor resigned on 29 December 1992 on the last day of the proceedings. Collor's resignation letter was read by his attorney in the floor of the Senate, and the impeachment trial was adjourned so that the Congress could meet in joint session, first to take formal notice of the resignation and proclaim the office of president vacant, and then to swear in Franco.

However, after the inauguration of Franco, the Senate resumed sitting as a court of impeachment with the president of the Supreme Court presiding. Collor's attorneys argued that with Collor's resignation, the impeachment trial could not proceed and should close without ruling on the merits. The attorneys arguing for Collor's removal, however, argued that the trial should continue, to determine whether or not the defendant should face the constitutional penalty of suspension of political rights for eight years. The Senate voted to continue the trial. It ruled that, although the possible penalty of removal from office had been rendered moot, the determination of the former president's guilt or innocence was still relevant because a conviction on charges of impeachment would carry with it a disqualification from holding public office for eight years. The Senate found that, since the trial had already begun, the defendant could not use his right to resign the presidency as a means to avoid a ruling.

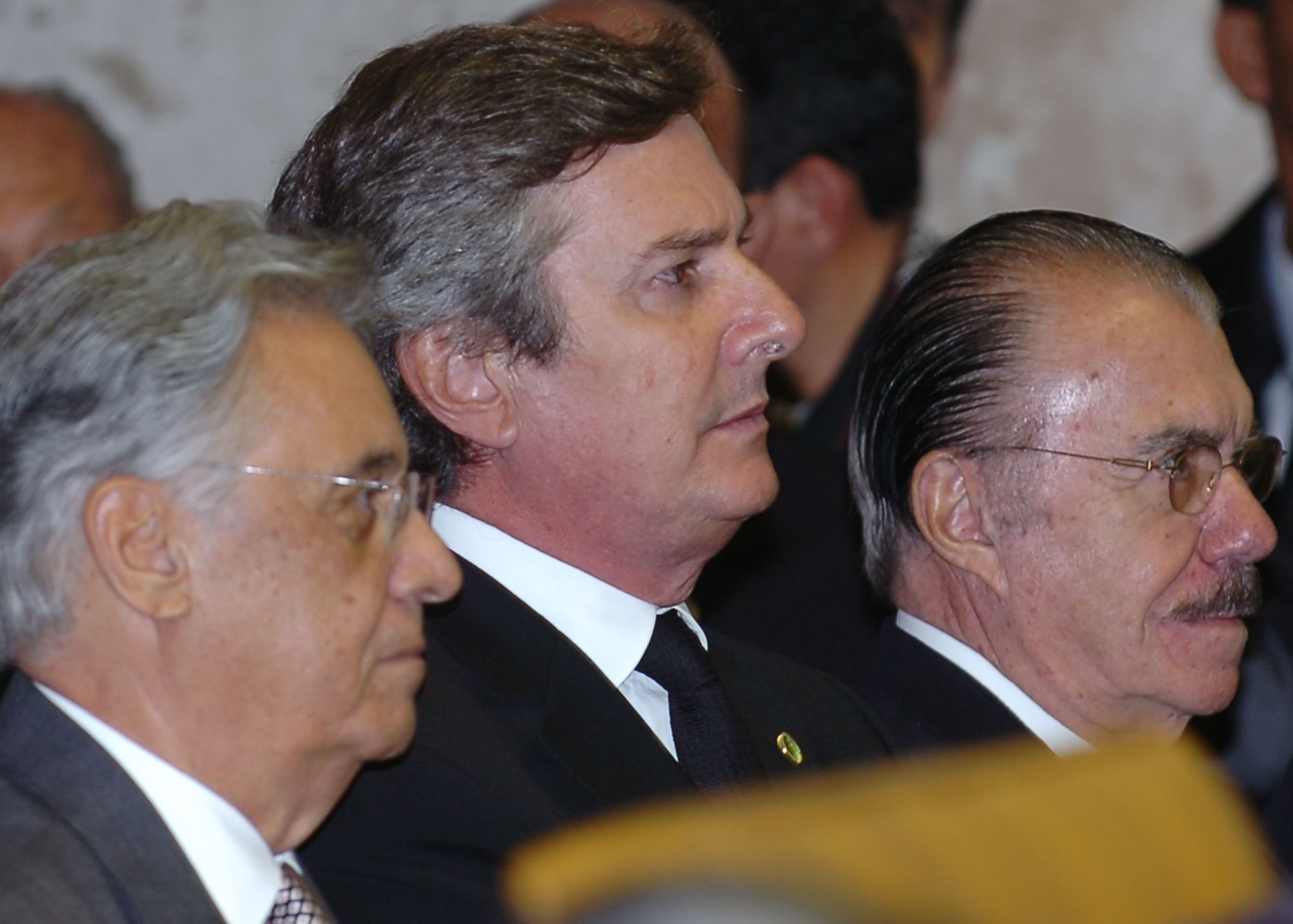
The former presidents Fernando Collor (center), Fernando Henrique Cardoso (left), and José Sarney (right), 2008

Later, in the early hours of 30 December 1992, by the required two-thirds majority, the Senate found the former president guilty of the charges of impeachment. Of the 81 members of the Senate, 79 took part in the final vote: 76 senators voted to convict the former president, and 3 voted to acquit. The penalty of removal from office was not imposed as Collor had already resigned, but as a result of his conviction the Senate barred Collor from holding public office for eight years. After the vote, the Senate issued a formal written opinion summarizing the conclusions and orders resulting from the judgement, as required by Brazilian law. The Senate's formal written sentence on the impeachment trial, containing its conviction of the former president and disqualification from public office for eight years, signed by the president of the Supreme Court and by the senators on 30 December 1992, was published in the Diário Oficial da União (the Brazilian Federal Government's official journal) on 31 December 1992.

In 1993, Collor challenged before the Brazilian Supreme Court the Senate's decision to continue the trial after his resignation but the Supreme Court ruled the Senate's action valid.

In 1994, the Supreme Court tried the ordinary criminal charges stemming from the Farias corruption affair; the ordinary criminal accusation was presented by the Brazilian federal prosecution service (Ministério Público Federal). The Supreme Court had original jurisdiction under the Brazilian Constitution because Collor was one of the defendants and the charges mentioned crimes committed by a president while in office. If found guilty of the charges, the former president would face a jail sentence. However, Collor was found not guilty. The Federal Supreme Court threw out the corruption charges against him on a technicality, citing a lack of evidence linking Collor to Farias' influence-peddling scheme. A key piece of evidence, Paulo César Farias' personal computer, was ruled inadmissible as it had been obtained during an illegal police search conducted without a search warrant. Other pieces of evidence that were only gathered because of the information first extracted from files stored in Farias' computer were also voided, as the Collor defense successfully invoked the fruit of the poisonous tree doctrine before the Brazilian Supreme Court. Evidence that was only obtained because of the illegally obtained information was also struck from the record.

After his acquittal in the criminal trial, Collor again attempted to void the suspension of his political rights imposed by the Senate, without success, as the Supreme Court ruled that the judicial trial of the ordinary criminal charges and the political trial of the charges of impeachment were independent spheres. Collor thus only regained his political rights in 2000, after the expiration of the eight-year disqualification imposed by the Brazilian Senate.

=== Collor's version of the impeachment ===
For several years after his removal from office, Collor maintained a website which has since been taken offline. In discussing the events surrounding the corruption charges, the former website stated: "After two and half years of the most intense investigation in Brazilian history, the Supreme Court of Brazil declared him innocent of all charges. Today he is the only politician in Brazil to have an officially clear record validated by an investigation by all interests and sectors of the opposition government. Furthermore, President Fernando Collor signed the initial document authorizing the investigation."

== Post-presidency ==
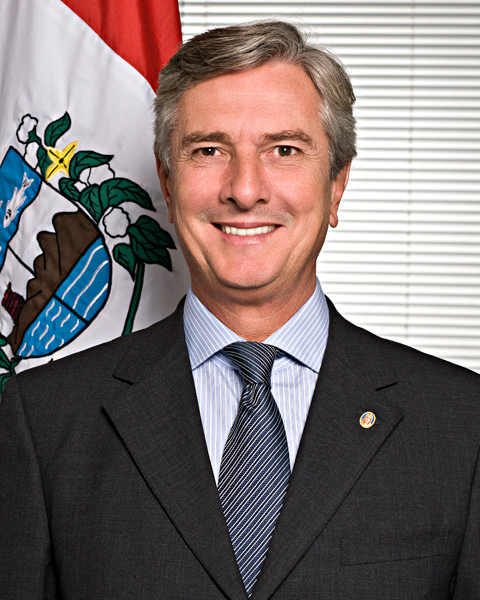
Collor's official photo as senator

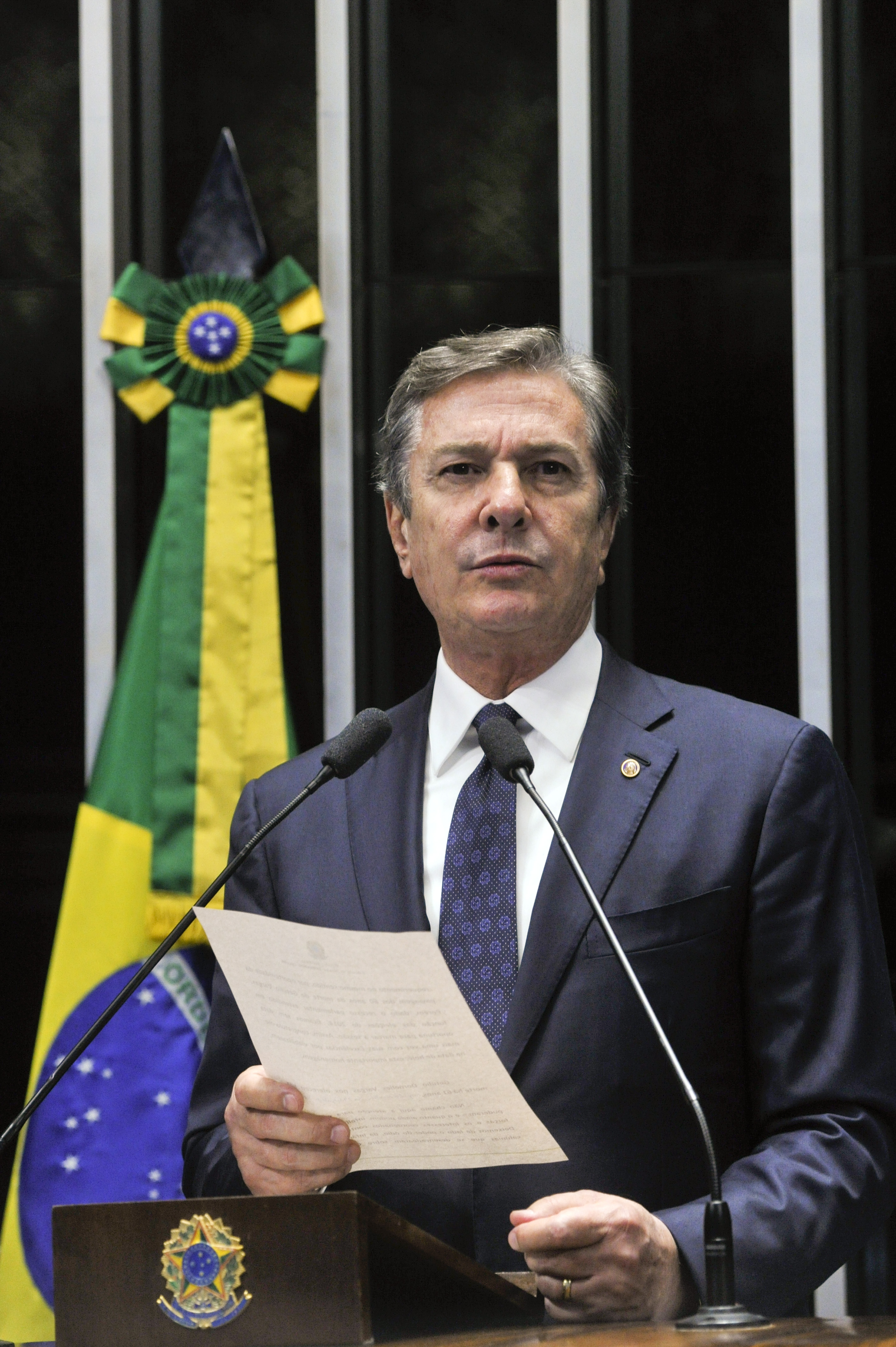
Collor speaks at the Federal Senate in August 2015

In 2000, Collor joined the Brazilian Labour Renewal Party (PRTB) and ran for mayor of São Paulo. His candidacy was declared invalid by the electoral authorities, as his political rights were still suspended by the filing deadline. In 2002, with political rights restored, he ran for Governor of Alagoas, but lost to incumbent Governor Ronaldo Lessa, who was seeking reelection.

In 2006, Collor was elected to the Federal Senate representing his state of Alagoas, with 44.03% of the vote, running again against Lessa. The following year he abandoned PRTB and switched to the Brazilian Labour Party (PTB). Collor has been, since March 2009, Chairman of the Senate Infrastructure Commission. Collor ran again for Governor of Alagoas in 2010. However, he lost the race, finishing a narrow third after Lessa and incumbent Teotonio Vilela Filho, thus eliminated from the runoff. This was Collor's second electoral loss.

In 2014, Collor was re-elected to the Senate with 55% of the vote.

On 20 August 2015, Collor was charged by the Prosecutor General of Brazil with corruption, as a development of Operation Car Wash (Portuguese: Operação Lava Jato). Details of the charge were kept under wraps so as not to jeopardize the investigation.

In 2016, Collor abandoned PTB and joined the Christian Labour Party (PTC), a small Christian democratic party which had no representatives in the Congress at the time. Collor also voted to impeach Rousseff as Senator.

In 2019, Collor left PTC and joined the Republican Party of the Social Order.

In 2022, Collor left the Republican Party of the Social Order and rejoined the Brazilian Labour Party (current). Also in 2022, Collor ran for Governor of Alagoas, placing 3rd and not making the run-off. Collor garnered 14,57% of the votes.

=== Conviction and arrest ===
In 2023, the Brazilian Supreme Federal Court voted to convict Collor on charges of money laundering and corruption. He was accused of receiving R$30 million in bribes from Petrobras. On 24 April 2025, Justice Alexandre de Moraes rejected Collor's appeal and reinstated his nine-year prison sentence. Collor was arrested the next day at Maceió's Zumbi dos Palmares International Airport in order to serve his corruption conviction. On 1 May, de Moraes allowed Collor to undergo house arrest on medical grounds.

== Electoral history ==
Year	Election	Party	Office	Coalition	Partners	Party	Votes	Percent	Result
1982	State Elections of Alagoas	PDS	Federal Deputy	—N/a			55,124	10.46%	Elected
1986	State Elections of Alagoas	MDB	Governor	Change and Renewal (PMDB, PCdoB, PJ, PTB, PSC)	Moacir Andrade	MDB	400,246	52.83%	Elected
1989	Presidential Election	PRN	President	New Brazil (PRN, PTR, PSC, PST)	Itamar Franco	PRN	20,611,030	30.48%	Runoff
1989	Presidential Election	PRN	President	New Brazil (PRN, PTR, PSC, PST)	Itamar Franco	PRN	35,090,206	53.03%	Elected
2002	State Elections of Alagoas	PRTB	Governor	People's Labour Front (PRTB, PTB, PPS, PPB, PFL)	Cacalo Rezente	PTB	419,741	40.17%	Not elected
2006	State Elections of Alagoas	PRTB	Senator	—N/a	Euclydes de Mello	PRTB	550,725	44.04%	Elected
2006	State Elections of Alagoas	PRTB	Senator	—N/a	Ada Mello	PRTB	550,725	44.04%	Elected
2010	State Elections of Alagoas	PTB	Governor	The People in the Government (PTB, PRB, PSL, PHS, PMN, PTC)	Galba Novais	Republicanos	389,337	28.8%	Not elected
2014	State Elections of Alagoas	PTB	Senator	With the People for Alagoas to Change (PMDB, PV, PTdoB, PROS, PCdoB, PSC, PHS, PTB, PSD, PDT, PT)	Renilde Bulhões	PTB	689,266	55.69%	Elected
2014	State Elections of Alagoas	PTB	Senator	With the People for Alagoas to Change (PMDB, PV, PTdoB, PROS, PCdoB, PSC, PHS, PTB, PSD, PDT, PT)	Severino Leão	PTB	689,266	55.69%	Elected
2022	State Elections of Alagoas	PTB	Governor	Green and Yellow Alagoas (PTB, PL, Agir)	Leonardo Dias	PL	223,585	14.71%	Not elected

== Honour ==
=== Foreign honours ===
- Malaysia:
  - Honorary Recipient of the Order of the Crown of the Realm (1991)
- Portugal:
  - Grand Cross of the Order of the Tower and Sword (1991)
- Spain:
  - Collar of the Order of Isabella the Catholic (10 May 1991)

== See also ==
- List of mayors of Maceió
- List of scandals in Brazil

Political offices
Preceded by José de Medeiros Tavares	Governor of Alagoas; 1987–1989	Succeeded by Moacir Lopes de Andrade
Preceded by José Sarney	President of Brazil; 15 March 1990 – 29 December 1992; Suspended: 2 October – 29 December 1992	Succeeded by Itamar Franco
