= 2024 Maceió mayoral election =

- October 6, 2024
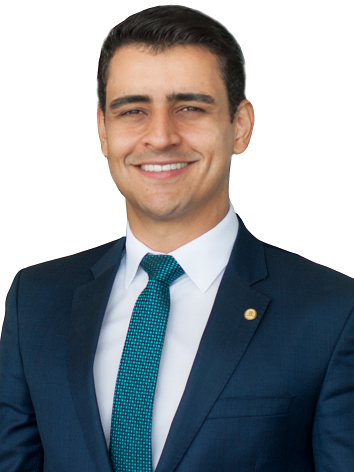

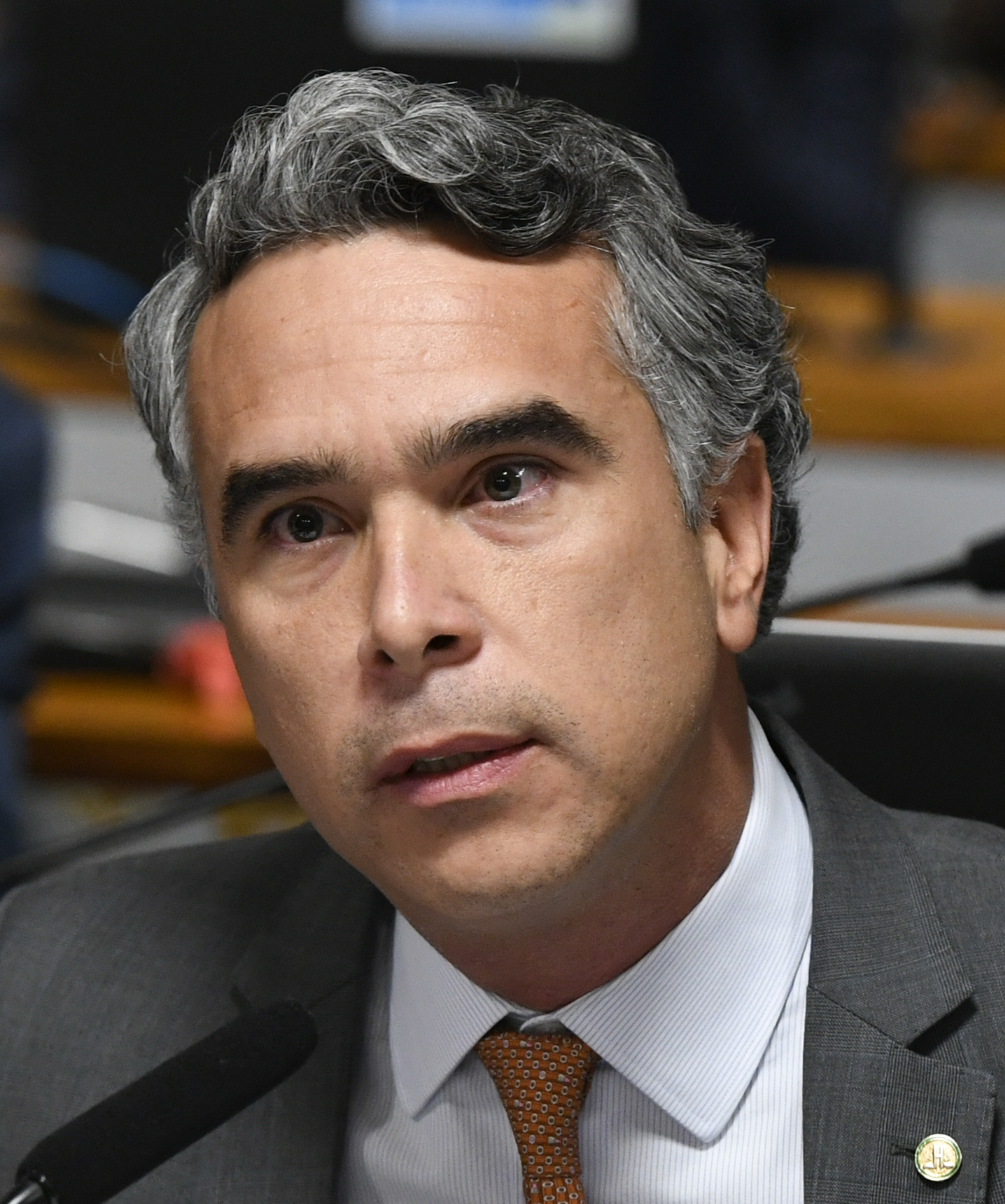
Nominee	João Henrique Caldas	Rafael Brito
Party	PL	MDB
Alliance	The Force of Work	Maceió Taken Seriously
Running mate	Rodrigo Cunha	Gaby Ronalsa
Popular vote	379,544	58,084
Percentage	83.25%	12.74%
Mayor before election
João Henrique Caldas
PL
Elected mayor
João Henrique Caldas
PL

The 2024 Maceió municipal election took place in the city of Maceió, Brazil on 6 October 2024. Voters elected a mayor, vice mayor, and 21 councillors.

The incumbent mayor is João Henrique Caldas or JHC of the PL. JHC was formerly elected mayor in 2020 as a member of the PSB. JHC was previously a Federal Deputy and a State Deputy.

JHC was elected in the first round, facing scattered opposition.

Popular vote (first round)
JHC	83.25%
Rafael	12.74%
Luna	2.05%
Lobão	1.88%
Nina	0.08%
