= Ada Mello =

Brazilian politician (1953-2023)

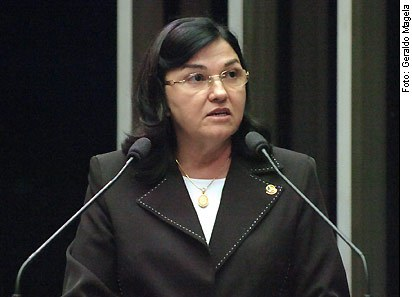
- Mello in 2008

Senator for Alagoas
- In office 15 September 2008 – 10 January 2009

Personal details
- Born: Ada Mercedes de Mello Marques Luz; 16 December 1953 Maceió, Alagoas, Brazil
- Died: February 20, 2023 (aged 69) Maceió, Alagoas, Brazil
- Party: PTB
- Relatives: Fernando Collor de Mello (cousin)
- Education: Federal University of Alagoas
- Profession: Politician; social worker; psychologist

Ada Mello (16 December 1953 - 20 February 2023) was a Brazilian politician and social worker. A member of the Brazilian Labour Party, she served on the Federal Senate from 2008 to 2009.

== Early life and education ==
Ada Mercedes de Mello Marques Luz was born on 16 December 1953 in Maceió. She graduated from Federal University of Alagoas with a degree in social work.

== Career ==
She became a leader in the Alagoas Brazilian Labour Party in 2008. On 15 September 2008, Mello was appointed to the Federal Senate after Fernando Collor de Mello took a leave of absence. She served on the Federal Senate until 10 January 2009. She served as an alternate senator for Alagoas from 2007 to 2015. She was the second woman from Alagoas to hold a seat in the Federal Senate.

Aside from her political career, she worked as a social worker and psychologist.

== Personal life and death ==
She was a cousin of Fernando Collor de Mello. She was Catholic and a follower of Saint Augustine. She died of lung cancer on 20 February 2023 at the age of 69 in Maceió.
