= Lindolfo Collor, Rio Grande do Sul =

Municipality of Rio Grande do Sul, Brazil

Lindolfo Collor
- Municipality
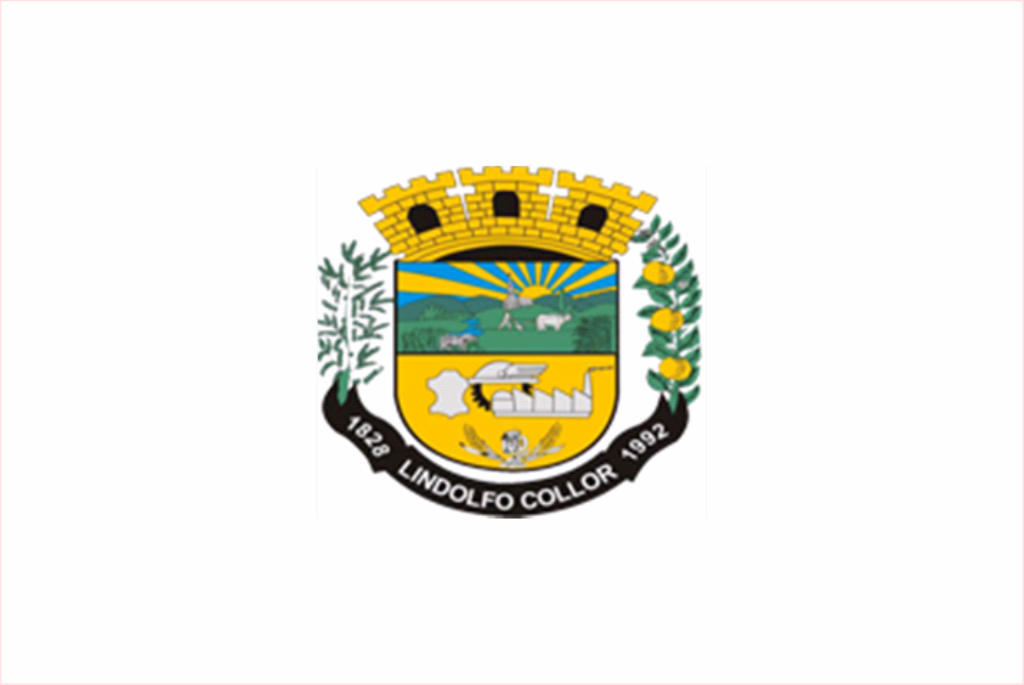
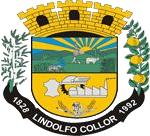
- Flag Coat of arms

- Location within Rio Grande do Sul

- Location in Brazil
- Coordinates: 29°35′49″S 51°12′32″W
- Country: Brazil
- State: Rio Grande do Sul
- Founded: March 26, 1992

Government
  - Mayor: Gaspar Behne (PP)

Area
  - Total: 32.99 km^{2} (12.74 sq mi)
- Elevation: 37 m (121 ft)

Population (2020)
  - Total: 6,125
  - Density: 185.7/km^{2} (480.9/sq mi)
- Time zone: UTC−3 (BRT)
- Postal code: 93900
- Area code: (+55) 51

Lindolfo Collor is a municipality in the state of Rio Grande do Sul, Brazil. It is named after the Minister of Labor during the Estado Novo. The population is 6,125 (2020 est.) in an area of 32.99 km².

== History ==
Lindolfo Collor was first colonized by German immigrants to Brazil. It was originally known as "Picada Capivara," a reference to the numerous capybaras in the region. When the town was incorporated the name "Lindolfo Collor" was adopted to honor the former Minister of Labor Lindolfo Leopoldo Boeckel Collor, who served in the government of Getúlio Vargas.

== Health ==
A study by the Instituto de Pesquisa Econômica Aplicada (Ipea), released in June 2008, named Lindolfo Collor as the second best city in Brazil in terms of public health. The study compared mortality rates and life expectancy between 1991 and 2000.

== See also ==
- List of municipalities in Rio Grande do Sul
