= Rafael Brito (politician) =

Brazilian politician (born 1981)

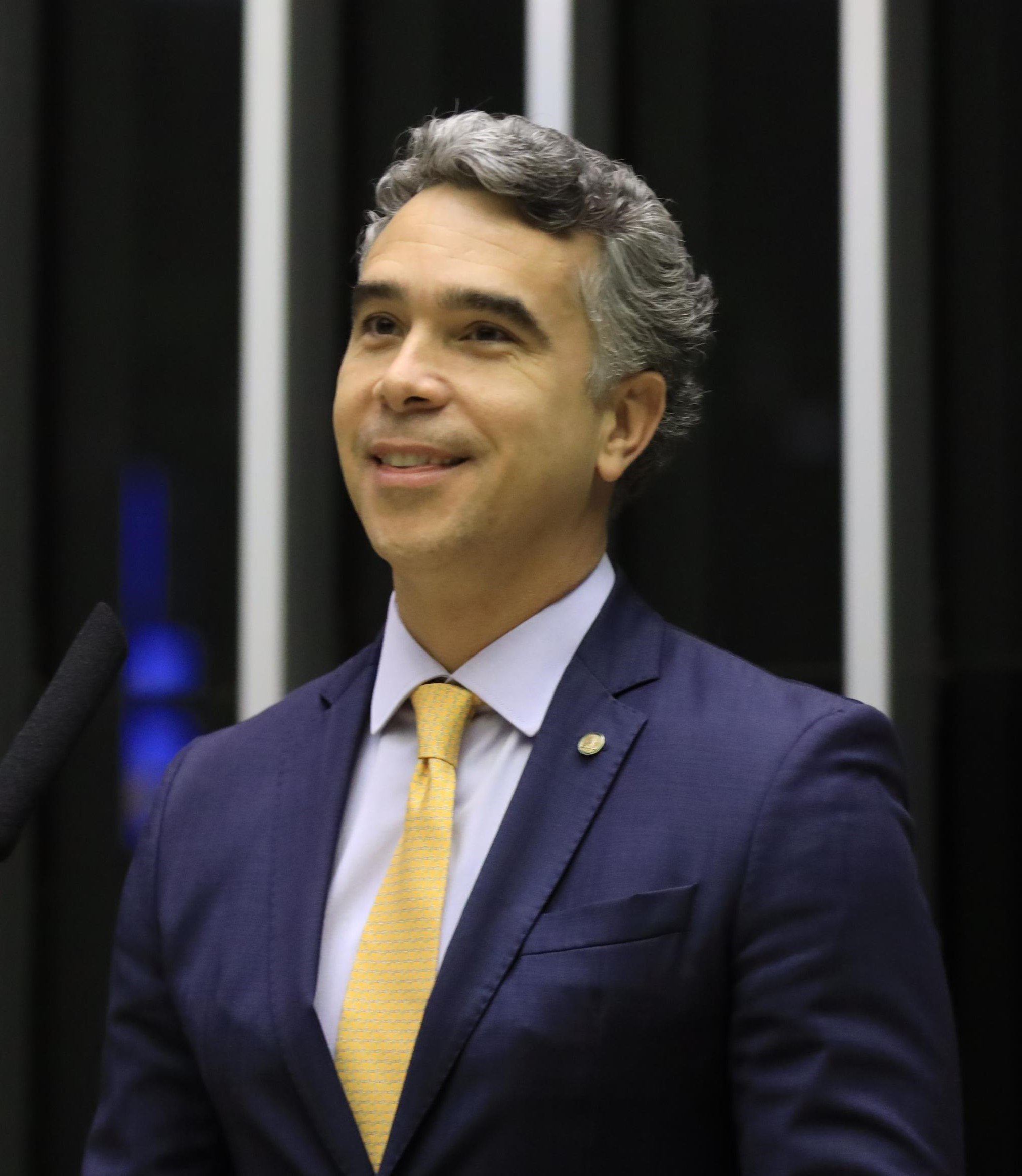
- Brito in 2023

Member of the Chamber of Deputies
- Incumbent
- Assumed office 1 February 2023
- Constituency: Alagoas

Personal details
- Born: Rafael de Goes Brito; 25 August 1981 (age 45) Maceió, Alagoas, Brazil
- Party: MDB (since 2021)
- Education: Federal University of Alagoas

Rafael de Goes Brito (born 25 August 1981) is a Brazilian politician serving as a member of the Chamber of Deputies since 2023. From 2017 to 2021, he served as secretary of economic development and tourism of Alagoas. From 2021 to 2022, he served as secretary of education of Alagoas.
