= Marina JHC =

Brazilian politician (born 1990)

- Marina JHC in 2026

Senator-elect for Alagoas
- Assuming office 1 February 2027

First Lady-designate of Alagoas
- Assuming office 6 January 2027
- Governor: João Henrique Caldas (elect)
- Succeeding: Júlia Dantas

First Lady of Maceió
- In role 1 January 2021 – 4 April 2026
- Mayor: João Henrique Caldas
- Preceded by: Tatiana Palmeira
- Succeeded by: Millane Hora

Personal details
- Born: Marina Antunes Candia e Figueiredo; 27 December 1990 (age 35) Cuiabá, Mato Grosso, Brazil
- Party: PSDB (2026–present)
- Other political affiliations: PSB (2022–2026)
- Spouse: João Henrique Caldas (m. 2022)

Marina Antunes Candia e Figueiredo (born 27 December 1990), better known as Marina JHC, is a Brazilian politician who was elected member of the Senate in 2026. She is married to João Henrique Caldas. From 2021 to 2026, she served as first lady of Maceió.

Honorary titles
Preceded by Tatiana Palmeira	First Lady of Maceió; 2021–2026	Succeeded by Millane Hora
Preceded by Júlia Dantas	First Lady of Alagoas; Taking role 2027	Designate
