= 2014 Alagoas general election =

Gubernatorial election of Algoas in October 2014

2014 Alagoas gubernatorial election
- October 5, 2014
Nominee	Renan Filho	Benedito de Lira	Julio Cezar
Party	MDB	PP	PSDB
Running mate	Luciano Barbosa	Alexandre Toledo	Vô
Popular vote	670,310	435,827	101,757
Percentage	52.16%	33.91%	7.92%
Governor before election
Teotônio Vilela Filho
PSDB
Elected Governor
Renan Filho
MDB

The Alagoas gubernatorial election was held on 5 October 2014 to elect the next governor of the state of Alagoas. If no candidate had received more than 50% of the vote, a second-round runoff election would have been held on 26 October. Governor Teotônio Vilela Filho was ineligible due to term limits. Federal Deputy Renan Filho of the PMDB won election to the open seat in the first round.

== Results ==
Alagoas Gubernatorial Election
Party	Candidate	Votes	%	±%
MDB	Renan Filho	670,310	52.16%	
PP	Benedito De Lira	435,827	33.92%	
PSDB	Julio Cezar	101,757	7.92%	
PSOL	Mário Agra	60,816	4.73%	
PTC	Joathas Albuquerque	7,879	0.61%	
PCB	Golbery Lessa	3,950	0.31%	
PEN	Coronel Goulart	2,732	0.21%	
PTN	Luciano Balbino	1,820	0.14%	
Majority		234,483	18.24%	
MDB gain from PSDB		Swing		
