= Dr. João =

Brazilian politician (born 1990)

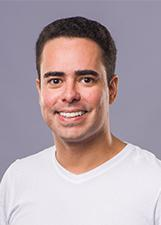
- João in 2022

Member of the Chamber of Deputies
- In office 29 May 2020 – 29 September 2020
- Preceded by: Tito Cordeiro
- Succeeded by: Tito Cordeiro
- Constituency: Bahia

Personal details
- Born: 21 March 1990 (age 36)
- Party: Solidarity (since 2023)
- Parent: João Caldas (father)
- Relatives: João Henrique Caldas (brother)

João Antonio Holanda Caldas (born 21 March 1990), better known as Dr. João, is a Brazilian politician. From May to September 2020, he was a member of the Chamber of Deputies. He is the son of João Caldas and the brother of João Henrique Caldas.
