= Ibateguara =

Municipality in Alagoas, Brazil

- Municipality of Alagoas, Brazil
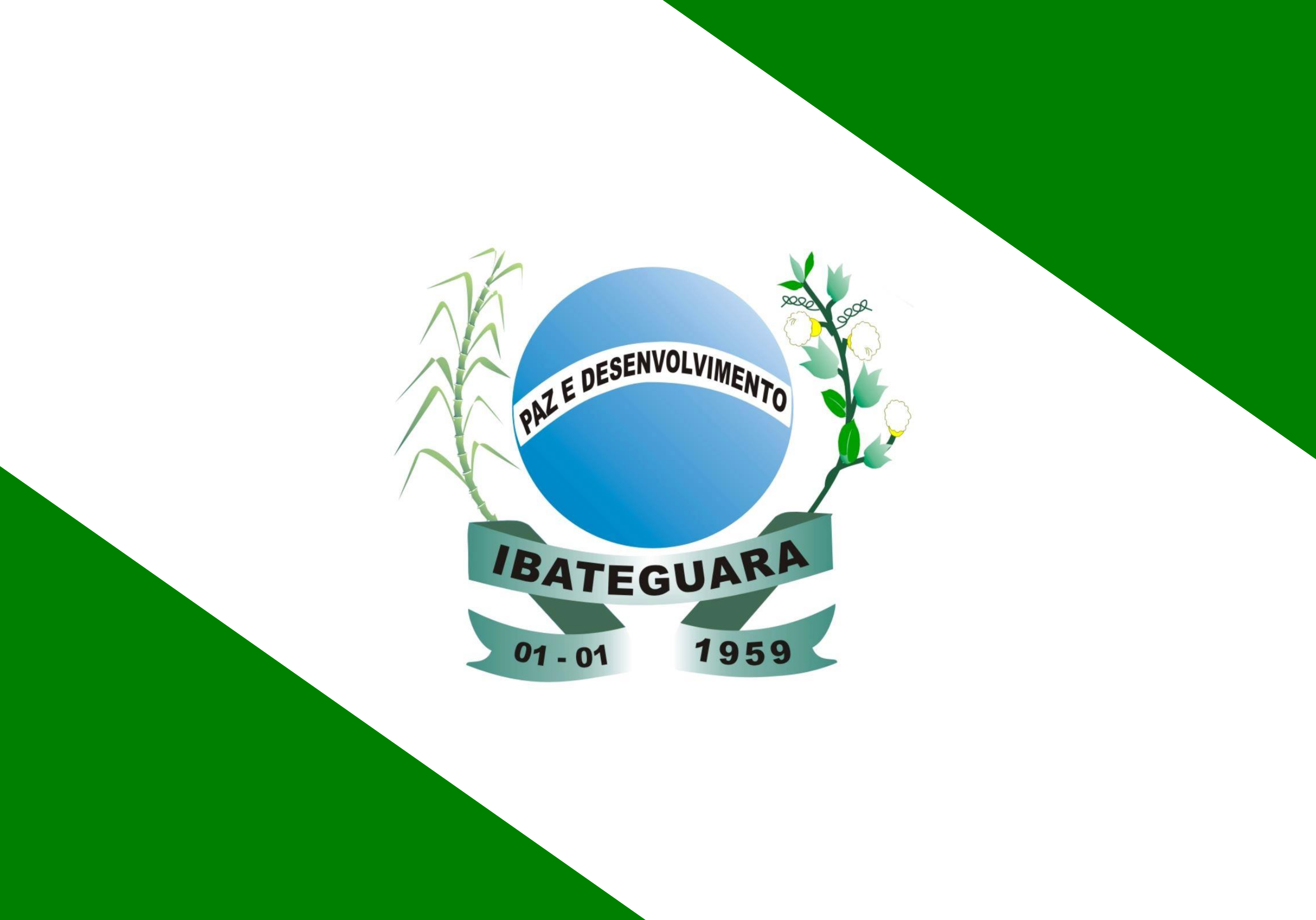
- Flag
- Etymology: In English "high place", originating from an indigenous origin
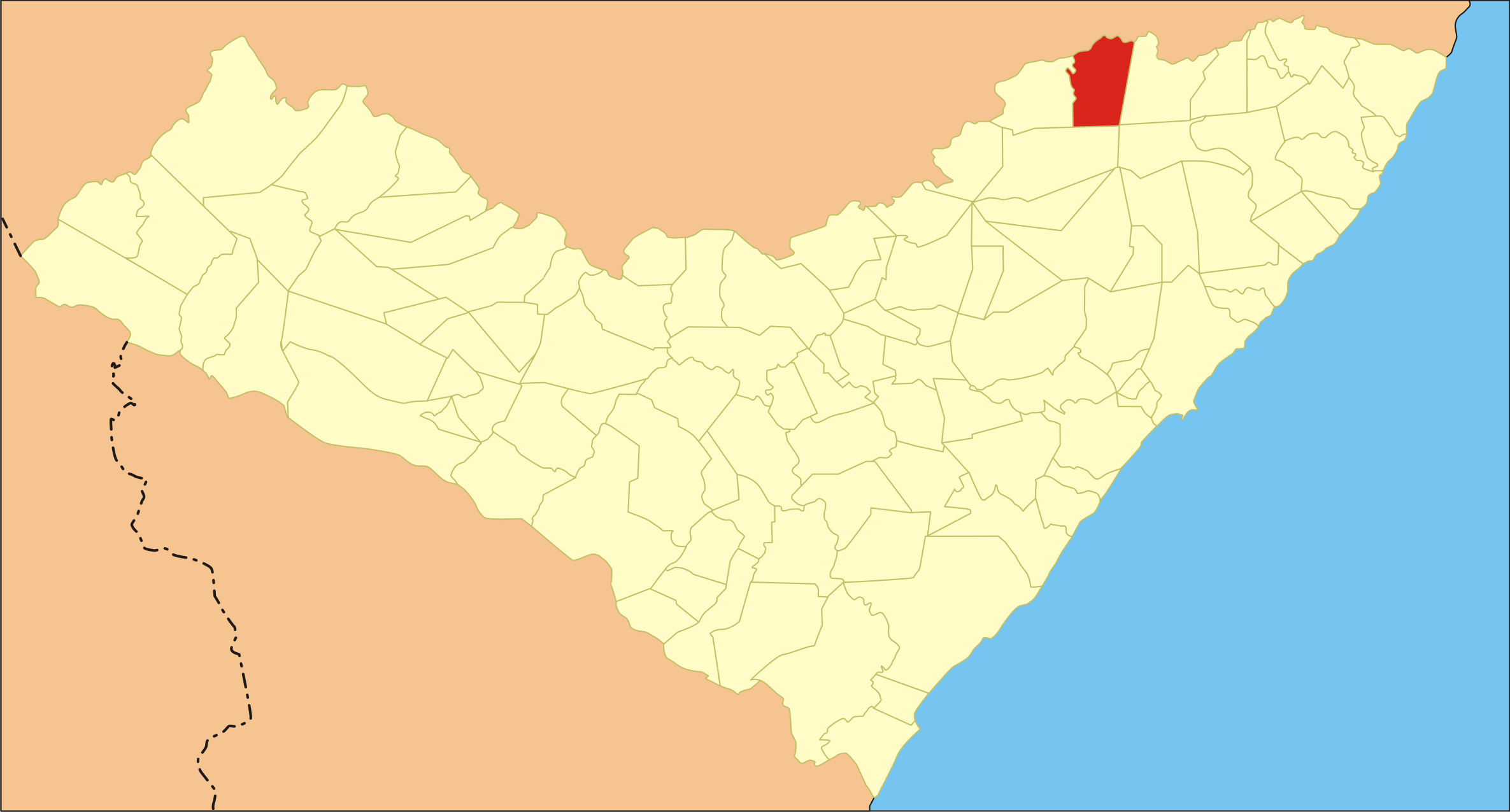
- Location of Ibateguara in Alagoas

- Location within Brazil Location within South America
- Coordinates: 8°58′20″S 35°55′55″W
- Country: Brazil
- Region: Northeast
- State: Alagoas
- Founded: 19 November 1957

Government
  - Mayor: Manoel Geraertes Alves Cruz (MDB) (2025-2028)
  - Vice Mayor: Francisco de Assis Leal (MDB) (2025-2028)

Area
  - Total: 265.312 km^{2} (102.438 sq mi)
- Elevation: 488 m (1,601 ft)

Population (2022)
  - Total: 13,731
  - Density: 51.75/km^{2} (134.0/sq mi)
- Demonym: Ibateguarense (Brazilian Portuguese)
- Time zone: UTC-03:00 (Brasília Time)
- Postal code: 57890-000, 57895-000
- HDI (2010): 0.518 – low
- Website: ibateguara.al.gov.br

Ibateguara (Central northeastern portuguese pronunciation: [ibɐtiˈgwɐɾa]) is a municipality located in the western of the Brazilian state of Alagoas. Its population is 15,627 (2020) and its area is 261 km^{2}.

== See also ==
- List of municipalities in Alagoas
