= Lindolfo Collor =

Brazilian journalist and politician

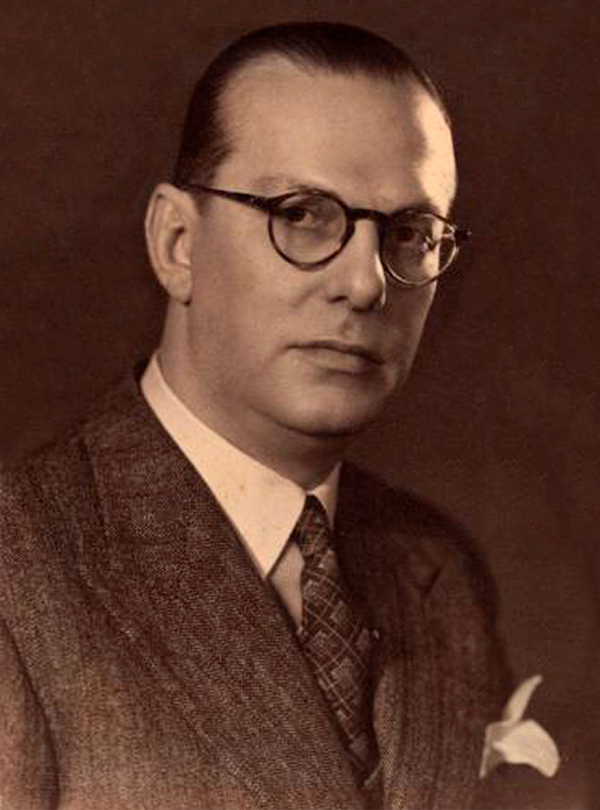

Minister of Labour
- In office 26 November 1930 – 4 April 1932
- President: Getúlio Vargas
- Preceded by: Office created
- Succeeded by: Joaquim Salgado Filho

Federal Deputy for Rio Grande do Sul
- In office 3 May 1924 – 11 November 1930

State Deputy for Rio Grande do Sul
- In office 22 September 1921 – 3 May 1924

Personal details
- Born: Lindolf Leopold Boeckel Collor; 4 February 1890 São Leopoldo, Rio Grande do Sul, Brazil
- Died: 21 September 1942 (aged 52) Rio de Janeiro, Brazil

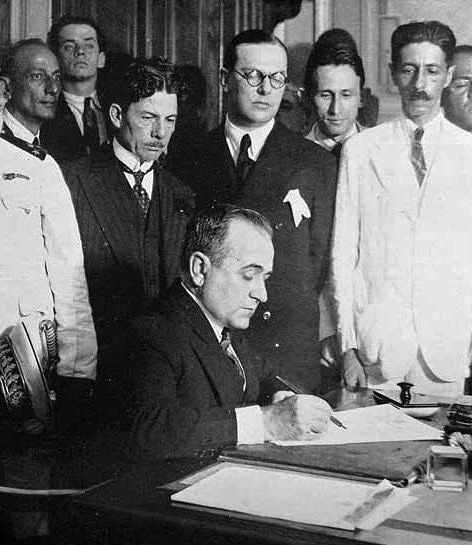
Lindolfo Collor (wearing glasses) standing behind President Getúlio Vargas, on 3 November 1930.

Lindolf Leopold Boeckel Collor, known as Lindolfo Collor (4 February 1890 – 21 September 1942) was a Brazilian journalist and politician.

He served as the first Labor minister under President Getúlio Vargas (1930–1932).

The town of Lindolfo Collor, Rio Grande do Sul is named after him.

His grandson, Fernando Collor de Mello, was President of Brazil (1990–1992).
