= Ronaldo Lessa =

Brazilian politician

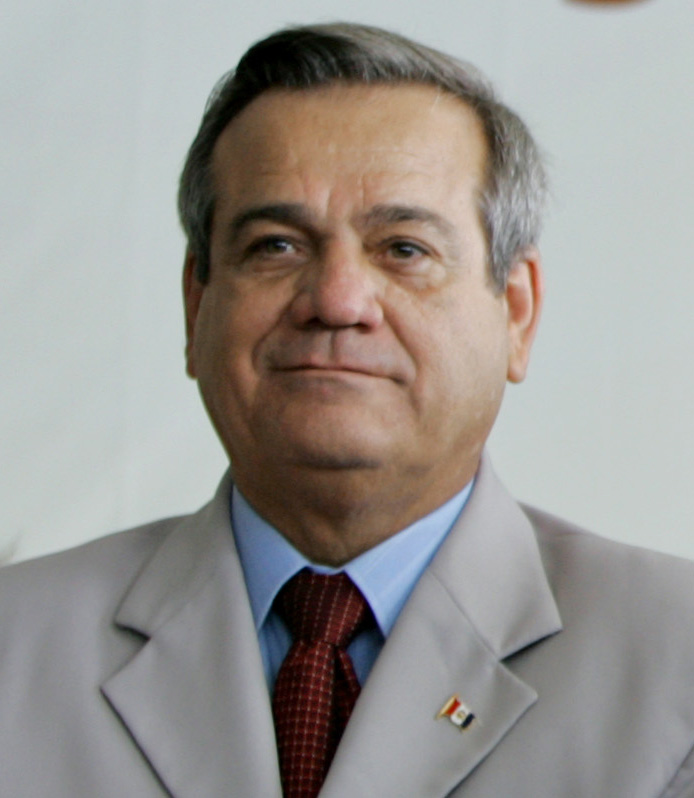
- Born: April 25, 1949 (age 77); Brazil

Ronaldo Augusto Lessa Santos GOMM (Maceió, April 25, 1949) is a Brazilian civil engineer and politician, former vice-president of Maceió, former governor of Alagoas for two states, former federal deputy for this state and former vice president from Maceió. He is currently vice-governor of Alagoas, affiliated with the Democratic Labor Party (PDT). He is the cousin of Federal Deputy, Maurício Quintella Lessa.

== Biography ==
Ronaldo Lessa is the father of three children: Nivaldo, born in 1992, adopted by the politician at the age of ten; Nina, born in 1986; and Dário, born in 1973, adopted by the politician at the age of seventeen.

He began his political activism with the Brazilian Communist Party (PCB). He studied civil engineering at the Federal University of Alagoas (Ufal), and there he led the student directories that opposed the military regime established in March 1964. In 1966, he joined the Brazilian Democratic Movement (MDB), a party opposing the government. He was also president of the Alagoan University Sports Federation (FADU) from 1969 to 1971. Because of his involvement in student circles, he was imprisoned for a few days in 1969. From 1973 onwards, Lessa worked on projects such as the renovation of the Duque refinery in Caxias, the maritime terminal in Ilha Grande Bay, the Rio de Janeiro Metro, and the Rio-Niterói Bridge.

He began his political career in 1982, when he was elected state deputy in Alagoas for the PMDB. He ran for state government in 1986, coming in third. He was elected mayor of Maceió in 1992, and in 1996, he supported and elected Kátia Born as his successor. In 1998, already affiliated with the PSB, he became governor of Alagoas, elected in the first round and re-elected in 2002 after beating former President of the Republic Fernando Collor de Mello. In the same year, he published his book Coragem para Sonhar e Fazer.

In February 2005, he joined the PDT, for which he would contest the 2006 election to the Federal Senate. This time, he would end up defeated by Collor. In the 2010 elections, he again ran for government in Alagoas, where he reached the second round but was defeated by Teotônio Vilela Filho. In the 2012 elections, Ronaldo ran for mayor of Maceió but had his candidacy denied. Candidate Rui Palmeira won in the first round.

In March 2016, he left the coordination of the Alagoas bench in the Chamber of Deputies for health reasons. The parliamentarian reported that he was suffering from a headache, which is why he has been on medical leave since January. He resumed his position in the Chamber at the end of March and coordinated the bench at the beginning of April.

In 2018, he was again a candidate for federal deputy for the PDT but failed to be re-elected. He was the first substitute in his coalition, with 55,474 votes. In 2020, he was elected vice mayor of Maceió on the ticket of João Henrique Caldas. In 2022, he was elected vice governor on Paulo Dantas' ticket.

== Controversies ==
Electoral Slander

Ronaldo Lessa was sentenced to eight months in prison, converted to providing services to the community, and paid a fine for electoral slander. As stated in the records, in October 2010, the PDT campaign committee was broken into, and, at the time, two computers were stolen from the premises. Lessa, then a candidate for governor, would have stated that the government was the biggest suspect in the crime, referring to the then candidate for re-election, Teotônio Vilela Filho, from the PSDB, in an interview published in the newspaper Gazeta de Alagoas, according to the complaint. The court considered that there was intent to offend the honor of the opponent in an electoral dispute. The parliamentarian appealed the decision, which was upheld.

According to the rapporteur of the action at the Federal Supreme Court, Minister Gilmar Mendes, the defense's claim that the then candidate's statements to the press did not lead to the identification of Teotônio Vilela as being offended is not sustainable. For the minister, Ronaldo Lessa points out, in his statements, as the main or biggest suspect in the theft, "the candidate who is our opponent", in the published version, and "the government" in the recording. "By mentioning our opponent or the government, the appellant directed his statements to the opponent", stated the rapporteur. According to the minister, there was no direct attribution of the crime in Lessa's statement, but rather her suspicion. "However, the criminal nature of slander does not require the attribution of certainty to the imputation", he stated. One can slander, according to the minister, placing doubt on the authorship of a crime without saying so explicitly.

Operation Razor

The deputy was sentenced for embezzlement and crimes against public administration to 13 years and 4 months in prison and payment of a fine. In the same process, businessman Zuleido Soares de Veras, from the Gautama construction company, was sentenced to 8 years in prison. The complaint, proposed by the Federal Public Ministry, was based on the MPF's own investigations and the final report of Operation Navalha, sent by the Federal Police. The parliamentarian appealed the sentence and was acquitted on appeal, in October 2017, by the Federal Supreme Court.

In October 2017, the deputy was acquitted by the 2nd Panel of the Federal Supreme Court due to lack of evidence.

Operation Gabiru

Ronaldo Lessa was cleared by the judge in the case due to lack of evidence.

Administrative misconduct

Lessa and Eduardo Henrique Ferreira, former Secretary of Finance, were convicted in a public civil action of administrative improbity due to mismanagement and misappropriation of R$50 million from the State Fund for Combating and Eradicating Poverty (FECOEP). The court ordered the loss of public service, the suspension of his political rights for three years, the prohibition of contracting with public authorities or receiving tax or credit incentives, and the imposition of a fine.

According to the decision, the State Public Prosecutor's Office reported that the fund, made up of revenue resulting from the ICMS levied on products classified as superfluous, despite having been established in 2004, only in 2005, by means of a decree, began to be collected with the additional Cool. "The accusations of committing administrative improbity brought to court refer to the irregularity in the management of the fund, as they state that only its form of collection was established, but violating the rules that determine the expenditure and its linking to specific purposes," the judges justified. Added to this, no specific bank account was created for the fund, with the amounts being deposited in the state's single account, which resulted in the expenditure of funds belonging to the fund without observing the fixed destination, using resources to cover other expenses of the fund. state, which would be prohibited. "There were more than R$ 50,000,000.00 that should have been directly allocated to combating the eradication of poverty that plagues the state of Alagoas, amounts that were, exceptionally, charged to citizens on the increase in ICMS, but which, in the end, were used to cover everyday expenses of the state of Alagoas, those that they were already naturally obliged to carry out." Lessa appealed the sentence, and the appeal is still ongoing.

Focoep was established on December 30, 2004, and receives 2% of the ICMS rate charged on products considered 'superfluous', such as alcoholic beverages, fireworks, weapons and ammunition, sports boats, jewellery, gasoline, ethanol and hydrated for fuel purposes, and electrical energy—in supply that exceeds the consumption range of 150 KWh per month—for home and commercial consumption—cigarettes, cigars, and perfumes. In 2010, under Teotônio Vilela Filho's administration, it was extended for an indefinite period.

Embezzlement of resources from the General Hospital and controversy with the prosecutor

Ronaldo Lessa and the former state secretary of health, Kátia Born, were accused by the Federal Public Ministry of misappropriation of public resources in the amount of R$5 million during the renovation of the Dr. Armando Lages Emergency Unit, currently the State General Hospital (HGE), in Maceió. According to the lawsuit, the defendants defrauded the bidding process using overpricing and non-performance of the contract. Also, according to the complaint, the company that won the bid for the reform of the HGE, Arquitec, would have given the money to the campaigns of Ronaldo Lessa, his brother Antônio Lessa, and secretary Kátia Born.

On February 20, in an interview published by the G1 portal, Lessa informed us that she was filing a representation against prosecutor Anselmo Henrique, considering that the accusations were arbitrary. He compared the MPF's decisions with those that occurred during the military dictatorship and said he was persecuted. The former governor said, "They are persecuting me. This prosecutor is a thief. I want him to prove that I embezzled all this money."

Following this accusation, on March 8, 2013, the MPF filed a complaint against the former governor for the crimes of slander, insult, and threat, for having described the public prosecutor Anselmo Henrique Cordeiro Lopes as a thief, irresponsible, and frivolous in press interviews in February 19th and 20th. Lessa would also have attacked the institution when she stated, when referring to the proposed action, that this was "another frivolous attitude from agents of the Public Ministry. These people should respect the institution, which has a lot of bums within the Public Ministry." On that occasion, the National Association of Public Prosecutors (ANPR) issued a note repudiating the former governor's statements.

Lessa and former secretary Kátia Born were acquitted of the charges.
