= Teotonio Vilela Filho =

Brazilian politician (born 1951)

Teotônio Vilela Filho
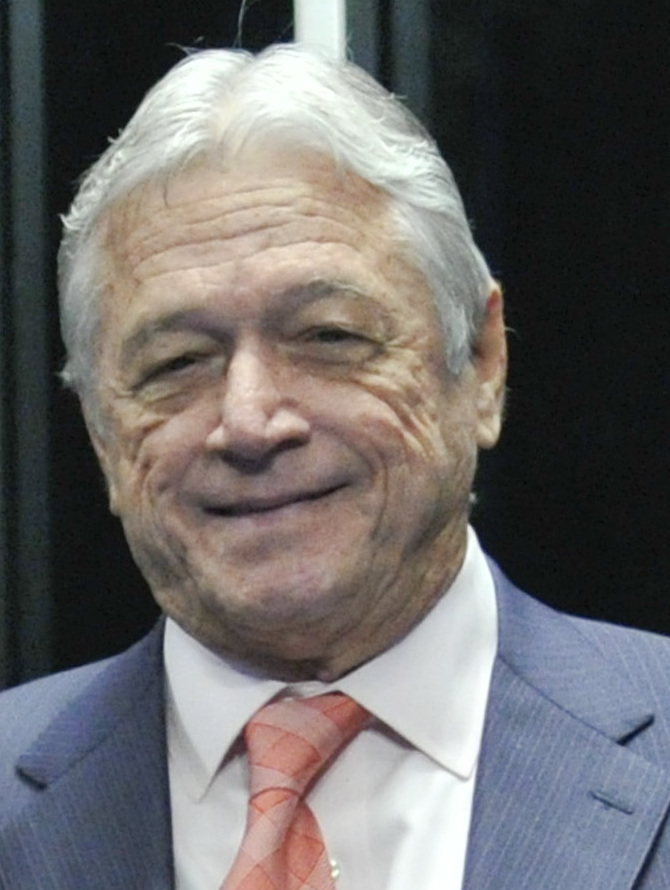

Governor of Alagoas
- In office January 1, 2007 – January 1, 2015
- Vice Governor: Wanderley Neto
- Preceded by: Luís Abílio
- Succeeded by: Renan Filho

Senator for Alagoas
- In office February 1, 1987 – January 1, 2007

Personal details
- Born: Teotônio Brandão Vilela Filho; January 29, 1951 (age 75) Viçosa, Alagoas, Brazil
- Party: PSDB (1988–present)
- Other political affiliations: PMDB (1986–88)
- Parent: Teotônio Vilela (father)
- Education: University of Brasília (BEc)
- Profession: Economist

Teotônio Brandão Vilela Filho (Viçosa, Alagoas, January 29, 1951) is a Brazilian economist, politician and Governor of Alagoas from 2007 to 2015. He graduated at the Universidade de Brasília and then specialized in Business Administration at the Fundação Getúlio Vargas. He is a son of Teotônio Brandão Vilela and Lenita Quintela. Brandão Vilela's degree in economics from the University of Brasilia (UNB), majoring in Business Administration from Fundação Getúlio Vargas (FGV).

He is one of the sons of the former senator Teôtonio Vilela, and was one of the founders of the PSDB. In 1986, he won his first Senate elections, becoming, at the time, the youngest senator to ever take office in Brazil. He was re-elected for that in 1994 and 2002. In 2006 he was elected the governor of Alagoas, being re-elected in 2010.

In 1997, Vilela was made an Honorary Knight Commander of the Order of the British Empire (KBE). The same year he received the Order of Military Merit of Brazil, and in 2000 the Order of Merit of Portugal.

Political offices
Preceded by Luís Abílio	Governor of Alagoas; 2007–2015	Succeeded by Renan Filho
