= Federal University of Alagoas =

University in Alagoas, Brazil

- Universidade Federal de Alagoas
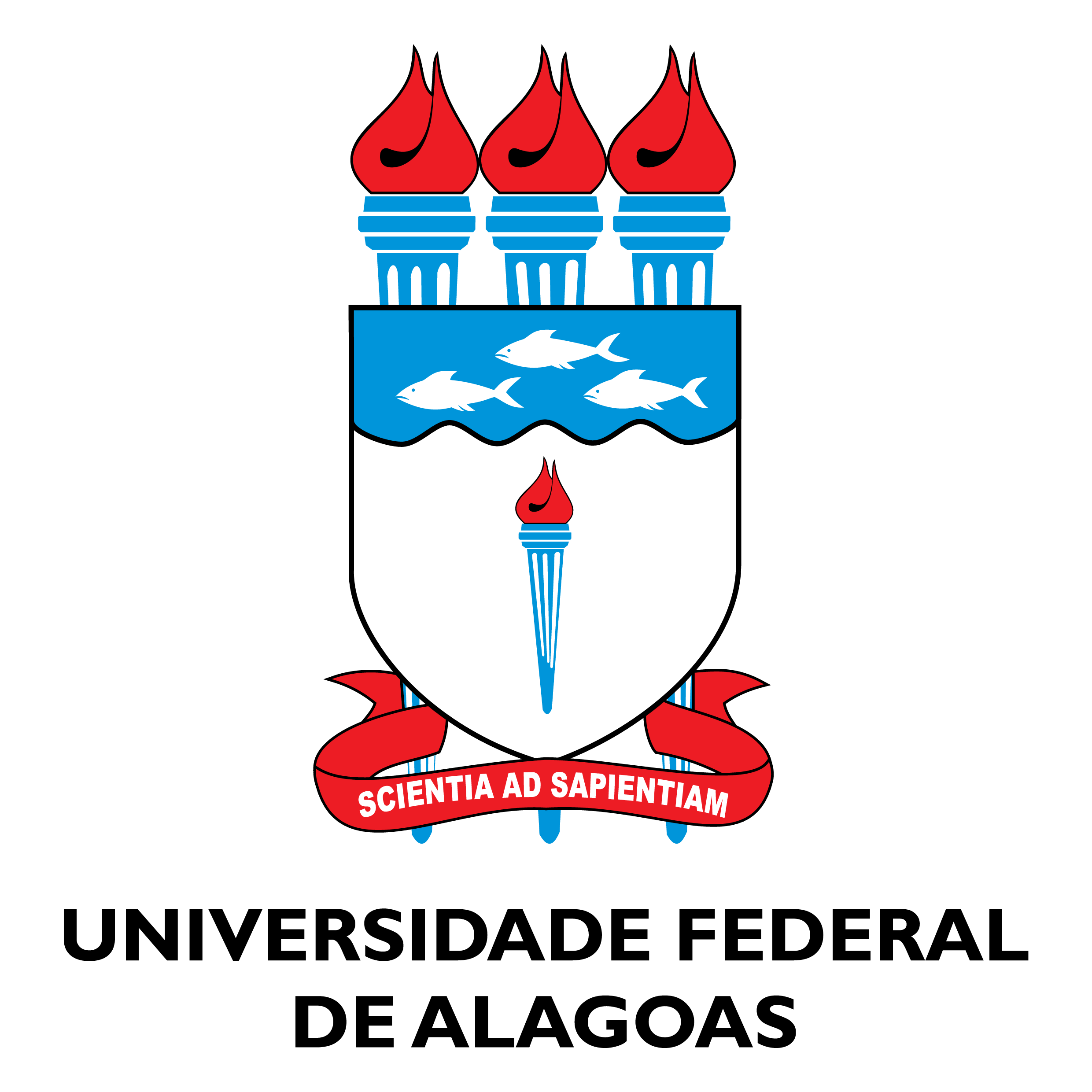
- Other name: UFAL
- Motto: Scientia ad Sapientiam
- Type: Public university system, Federal
- Established: January 25, 1961 (Law School dates from 1933)
- Endowment: R$ 907.655.404,00 (2021)
- Rector: Josealdo Tonholo
- Faculty: 1,826 (2017)
- Administrative staff: 1,774 (2017)
- Students: 28,312 (2022)
- Undergraduates: 22,522 (2017)
- Postgraduates: 1,326 (2017)
- Location: Maceió, Alagoas, Brazil
- Campus: 3 campuses: (Maceió/A. C. Simões, Arapiraca and Delmiro Gouveia/Sertão);
- Website: www.ufal.br

The Federal University of Alagoas (Portuguese: Universidade Federal de Alagoas, UFAL) is a public university, located in the city of Maceió, in the coastal state of Alagoas. It is one of the main research centers in Brazilian north eastern region (one of the five regions of Brazil). It is located very near the city's airport.

== Academic units ==
- EEF - School of Nursing and Pharmacy;
- ICF - Institute of Pharmaceutical Sciences
- CONTACT - Faculty of Arts;
- ICS - Institute of Social Sciences;
- IC - Institute of Computing;
- IF - Institute of Physics;
- ICAT - Institute of Atmospheric Sciences;
- IM - Institute of Mathematics;
- IQB - Institute of Chemistry and Biotechnology;
- CTEC - Center for Technology;
- FALE - Faculty of Letters;
- FAU - College of Architecture and Urbanism;
- FOUFAL - School of Dentistry;
- FEAC - Faculty of Economics, Management and Accounting;
- FN - School of Nutrition;
- FSSO - School of Social Service;
- FAMED - School of Medicine;
- ECSC - Center for Agricultural Sciences;
- CEDU - Education Center;
- FDA - Faculty of Law of Alagoas;
- ICBS - Institute of Biological Sciences and Health;
- IGDEMA - Institute of Geography, Development and Environment;
- ICHCA - Institute of Social Sciences, Communication and Arts.
- IP - Institute of Psychology

== See also ==
- Brazil University Rankings
- List of federal universities of Brazil
- Universities and Higher Education in Brazil
