= Nunes Marques =

Brazilian judge

His Excellency Nunes Marques
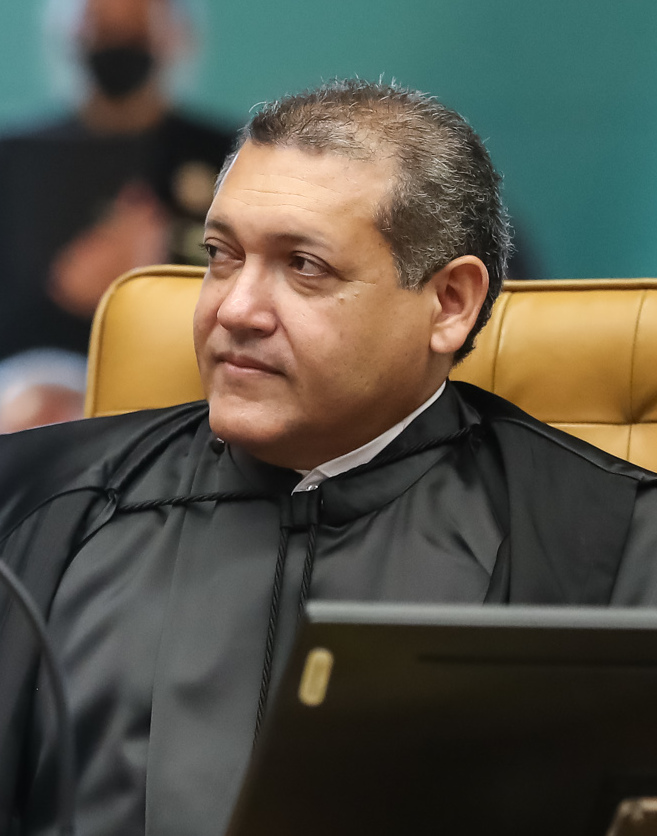

Justice of the Supreme Federal Court
- Incumbent
- Assumed office 5 November 2020
- Nominated by: Jair Bolsonaro
- Preceded by: Celso de Mello

Desembargador of the Regional Federal Court of the 1st Region
- In office 12 May 2011 – 5 November 2020
- Nominated by: Dilma Rousseff
- Preceded by: Carlos Mathias
- Succeeded by: Gustavo Soares Amorim

Personal details
- Born: Kássio Nunes Marques; 16 May 1972 (age 54) Teresina, Piauí, Brazil
- Education: Federal University of Piauí (LL.B.); Autonomous University of Lisbon (LL.M.); University of Salamanca (S.JD.)

Kássio Nunes Marques (born 16 May 1972) is a Brazilian magistrate, currently a Justice at the Supreme Federal Court.

On 1 October 2020, president Jair Bolsonaro confirmed the nomination of Nunes to assume a seat in the Supreme Federal Court, due to the retirement of justice Celso de Mello. Nunes' nomination was confirmed by both Senate Justice Committee and Senate floor on 21 October 2020.

== Academic career ==
Nunes was the first in his family to attend college. After receiving his Bachelor of Laws from the Federal University of Piauí (UFPI), Nunes concluded a specialization in tax law at the Federal University of Ceará (UFCE), as well as Master of Constitutional Law at the Autonomous University of Lisbon. Nunes recently defended his thesis for his doctorate at the University of Salamanca.

== Judicial career ==
In May 2008, Nunes became a judge of the Electoral Regional Court of Piauí (TRE-PI).

On 12 July 2011, Nunes was nominated by president Dilma Rousseff to serve as desembargador of the Federal Regional Court of the 1st Region (TRF-1), due to the "Constitutional Fifth", after the retirement of desembargador Carlos Mathias.

On 30 September 2020, president Jair Bolsonaro told the justices of the Supreme Federal Court of his intention to nominate Nunes to be member of the court, replacing justice Celso de Mello, due to his retirement. His choice was considered, by allies of the president and by the press, as a surprise, given that Nunes wasn't in the lists of potential nominees for the seat. Nunes was classified as "balanced and discreet". At the same time, two members of the high court commented, in a reserved talk with the press, that they were relieved by the nomination, since Nunes wasn't "highly identified with Bolsonaro".

== Personal life ==
Nunes declares himself as a Catholic. He is married to Maria do Socorro Marques, who in 2020 worked as a commissioned employee for the staff of senator Elmano Férrer (PODE-PI), and who, previously, served in the staff of senator Wellington Dias (PT-PI) between 2011 and 2014, his first substitute, Regina Sousa (PT-PI), between 2015 and 2018, and second substitute Zé Santana (MDB-PI) in 2019.

Nunes has a son, Kevin de Carvalho Marques. Kevin's law firm received BRL 281,630.00 between August 2024 and July 2025, paid as legal fees by Consult Intelligence. Consult, which "declared revenues of R$ 25.5 thousand", received R$6.6 million from Banco Master and R$11.3 million from JBS (owned by brothers Joesley and Wesley Batista), which led the Council for the Control of Financial Activities (Coaf) to classify the transactions as "incompatible with the financial capacity" of the company and indicating a possible "non-formal" origin of the amounts. The office of Kevin Marques, who presented himself on the website itself as a lawyer "with one year of experience at the OAB", denied any irregularity in the payment of fees and reported that Kevin Marques never defended cases in the STF, also rejecting "attempts to criminalize the practice of law and to interfere with professional secrecy".

Legal offices
Preceded by Carlos Mathias	Desembargador of the Regional Federal Court of the 1st Region; 2011–2020	Succeeded by Gustavo Soares Amorim
Preceded by Celso de Mello	Justice of the Supreme Federal Court; 2020–present	Incumbent
