= 1966 in Brazil =

Events in the year 1966 in Brazil.

== Incumbents ==
=== Federal government ===
- President: Marshal Castelo Branco
- Vice President: José Maria Alkmin

=== Governors ===
- Acre: Vacant
- Alagoas:
  - Luis Cavalcante (until 31 January)
  - João José Batista Tubino (31 January-15 August)
  - Antônio Simeão de Lamenha Filho (from 15 August)
- Amazonas:
  - Artur César Ferreira Reis (until 12 September)
  - Danilo Duarte de Matos Areosa (from 12 September)
- Bahia: Lomanto Júnior
- Ceará:
  - Virgilio Távora (until 12 August)
  - Franklin Chaves (12 August-12 September)
  - Plácido Castelo (from 12 September)
- Espírito Santo:
  - Francisco Lacerda de Aguiar (until 5 April)
  - Rubens Rangel (from 5 April)
- Goiás:
  - Emílio Rodrigues Ribas Jr (until 31 January)
  - Otávio Lage (from 31 January)
- Guanabara:
  - Raphael de Almeida Magalhães (until 5 December)
  - Francisco Negrão de Lima (from 5 December)
- Maranhão:
  - Newton de Barros Belo (until 31 January)
  - José Sarney (from 31 January)
- Mato Grosso:
  - Fernando Corrêa da Costa (until 31 January)
  - Pedro Pedrossian (from 31 January)
- Minas Gerais:
  - José de Magalhães Pinto (until 31 January)
  - Israel Pinheiro da Silva (from 31 January)
- Pará:
  - Jarbas Passarinho (until 31 January)
  - Alacid Nunes (from 31 January)
- Paraíba:
  - Pedro Gondim (until 31 January)
  - João Agripino Maia (from 31 January)
- Paraná:
  - Algacir Guimarães (until 31 January)
  - Pablo Cruz Pimentel (from 31 January)
- Pernambuco: Paulo Pessoa Guerra
- Piauí:
  - Petrônio Portella (until 12 August)
  - José Odon Maia Alencar (12 August-12 September)
  - Helvídio Nunes (from 12 September)
- Rio de Janeiro:
  - Pablo Torres (until 12 August)
  - Teotonio Araujo (from 12 August)
- Rio Grande do Norte:
  - Aluízio Alves (until 31 January)
  - Walfredo Gurgel Dantas (until 31 January)
- Rio Grande do Sul:
  - Ildo Meneghetti (until 12 September)
  - Walter Peracchi Barcelos (from 12 September)
- Santa Catarina:
  - Celso Ramos (until 12 September)
  - Ivo Silveira (from 12 September)
- São Paulo:
  - Ademar de Barros (until 6 June)
  - Laudo Natel (from 6 June)
- Sergipe:
  - Celso Carvalho (until 31 January)
  - Lourival Baptista (from 31 January)

=== Vice governors ===
- Alagoas: Manoel Sampaio Luz
- Bahia: Orlando Moscoso
- Ceará:
  - Joaquim de Figueiredo Correia (until 12 September)
  - Humberto Ellery (from 12 September)
- Espírito Santo:
  - Rubens Rangel (until 5 April)
  - Vacant thereafter (from 5 April)
- Goiás:
  - Antônio Rezende Monteiro (until 31 January)
  - Osires Teixeira (from 31 January)
- Maranhão:
  - Alfredo Salim Duailibe (until 31 January)
  - Antonio Jorge Dino (from 31 January)
- Mato Grosso:
  - Jose Garcia Nieto (until 31 January)
  - Lenine de Campos Póvoas (from 31 January)
- Minas Gerais:
  - Clóvis Salgado da Gama (until 31 January)
  - Pio Soares Canedo (from 31 January)
- Pará:
  - Agostinho de Meneses de Monteiro (until 31 January)
  - João Renato Franco (from 31 January)
- Paraíba:
  - André Avelino de Paiva Gadelha (until 31 January)
  - Antônio Juarez Farias (from 31 January)
- Paraná: Plínio Franco Ferreira da Costa
- Pernambuco: Vacant
- Piauí: João Clímaco d'Almeida
- Rio de Janeiro:
  - Teotônio Araújo (until 12 August)
  - Vacant thereafter (from 12 August)
- Rio Grande do Norte:
  - Teodorico Bezerra (until 31 January)
  - Clóvis Motta (from 31 January)
- Santa Catarina:
  - Armindo Marcílio Doutel de Andrade (until 31 January)
  - Francisco Roberto Dall'Igna (31 January-19 July)
  - Vacant thereafter (from 19 July)
- São Paulo:
  - Laudo Natel (until 6 June)
  - Vacant thereafter (from 6 June)
- Sergipe: Vacant

== Events ==
=== February ===
- 5 February: Institutional Act Number Three (AI-3) is issued, which introduces indirect elections for governors and vice-governors, as well as the appointment of mayors.
- 21 February: Pelé marries Rosemeri dos Reis Cholbi.

=== June ===
- 5 June: Adhemar de Barros is removed as Governor of São Paulo and has his political rights revoked by President Castelo Branco.
- 6 June: Brazilian Communist Party leader Luís Carlos Prestes is sentenced to 14 years in prison.

=== July ===
- 25 July: A bomb attack attempting to assassinate presidential candidate Artur da Costa e Silva at Recife International Airport, leaves three dead and several injured.

=== August ===
- 20 August: The corpses of two electronic technicians wearing lead masks are found near Rio de Janeiro in an advanced state of decomposition. The cause of their death has never been determined and has been subject to much speculation.

=== September ===
- 13 September: President Humberto de Alencar Castelo Branco signs the law establishing the Severance Indemnity Fund, in order to protect dismissed workers, without just cause.

=== October ===
- 3 October: National Renewal Alliance candidate Artur da Costa e Silva is elected President of Brazil by the National Congress with 295 votes in an indirect presidential election.

== Births ==
=== January ===
- 18 January: André Ribeiro, racing driver
- 19 January: Aílton Ferraz, retired footballer
- 29 January: Romário, retired footballer and politician
- 31 January: Müller, retired footballer and pundit

=== April ===
- 2 April: Supla, musician
- April 14: Suzana Cavalheiro, Brazilian footballer

=== May ===
- 8 May: Cláudio Taffarel, footballer

=== July ===
- 2 July: Rigan Machado, 8th degree red and black belt from Brazilian Jiu-Jitsu
- 12 July: Mendonça Filho, ex-governor of Pernambuco
- 15 July: Samuel Rosa, singer and guitarist of Skank

=== December ===
- 5 December: Rick Sollo, singer-songwriter (d. 2026)
- 12 December: Royce Gracie, mixed martial artist
- 23 December: Cláudia Raia, actress, dancer and singer

== Deaths ==
=== May ===
- 15 May: Venceslau Brás, 9th President of Brazil (b. 1868)

== See also ==
- 1966 in Brazilian football
- 1966 in Brazilian television
