= Bona Medeiros =

Brazilian lawyer and politician

Member of the Legislative Assembly of Piauí
- In office 1991–1999

Governor of Piauí
- In office May 14, 1986 – March 15, 1987
- Preceded by: Hugo Napoleão
- Succeeded by: Alberto Tavares Silva

Vice Governor of Piauí
- In office March 15, 1983 – May 14, 1986
- Preceded by: Waldemar de Castro Macedo
- Succeeded by: Lucídio Portela Nunes

Mayor of Teresina
- In office March 23, 1979 – May 14, 1982
- Preceded by: Raimundo Wall Ferraz
- Succeeded by: Jesus Tajra

Mayor of Teresina
- In office October 10, 1969 – May 31, 1970
- Preceded by: Jofre do Rego Castelo Branco
- Succeeded by: Joel da Silva Ribeiro

Member of the Legislative Assembly of Piauí
- In office 1963–1983

Personal details
- Born: December 24, 1930 União, Piauí, Brazil
- Died: April 6, 2017 (aged 86) Teresina, Piauí
- Party: Liberal Front Party
- Spouse: Helena Medeiros
- Profession: Lawyer

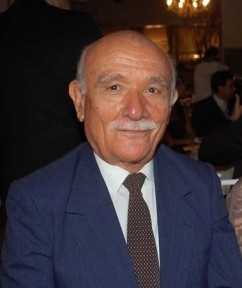

José Raimundo Bona Medeiros, most commonly known as Bona Madeiros, (December 24, 1930 – April 6, 2017) was a Brazilian lawyer and politician. He served as the Governor of Piauí from 1986 to 1987, Vice Governor of Piauí from 1983 to 1986, and Mayor of Teresina, the state capital, from 1969 to 1970 and again from 1979 to 1982. He also served in the state Legislative Assembly of Piauí for seven terms.

Madeiros was born in União, Piauí, on December 24, 1930. He studied at the Universidade Federal do Piauí (Federal University of Piauí).

Medeiros was first elected to the Legislative Assembly of Piauí in 1962. he eventually served as the President of the Legislative Assembly.

In 1982, Bona Medeiros was elected Vice Governor of Piauí on the same ticket as Governor Hugo Napoleão as a member of the now-defunct Liberal Front Party (PFL). In 1986, Medeiros became the Governor of Piauí following the resignation of Governor Napoleão, who left office to run for Federal Senate. Medeiros served as Governor during the remainder of Napoleão's unexpired term from 1986 to 1987.

Medeiros suffered a heart attack at his home on April 6, 2017. He was rushed to the private Hospital São Marcos in Teresina, where he died on April 6, 2017, at the age of 86. A public funeral was held at the Legislative Assembly in Teresina on April 7, 2017. Medeiros was buried in the União cemetery in União.

== See also ==
- List of mayors of Teresina
