= Firmino Filho =

Brazilian politician and economist (1963–2021)

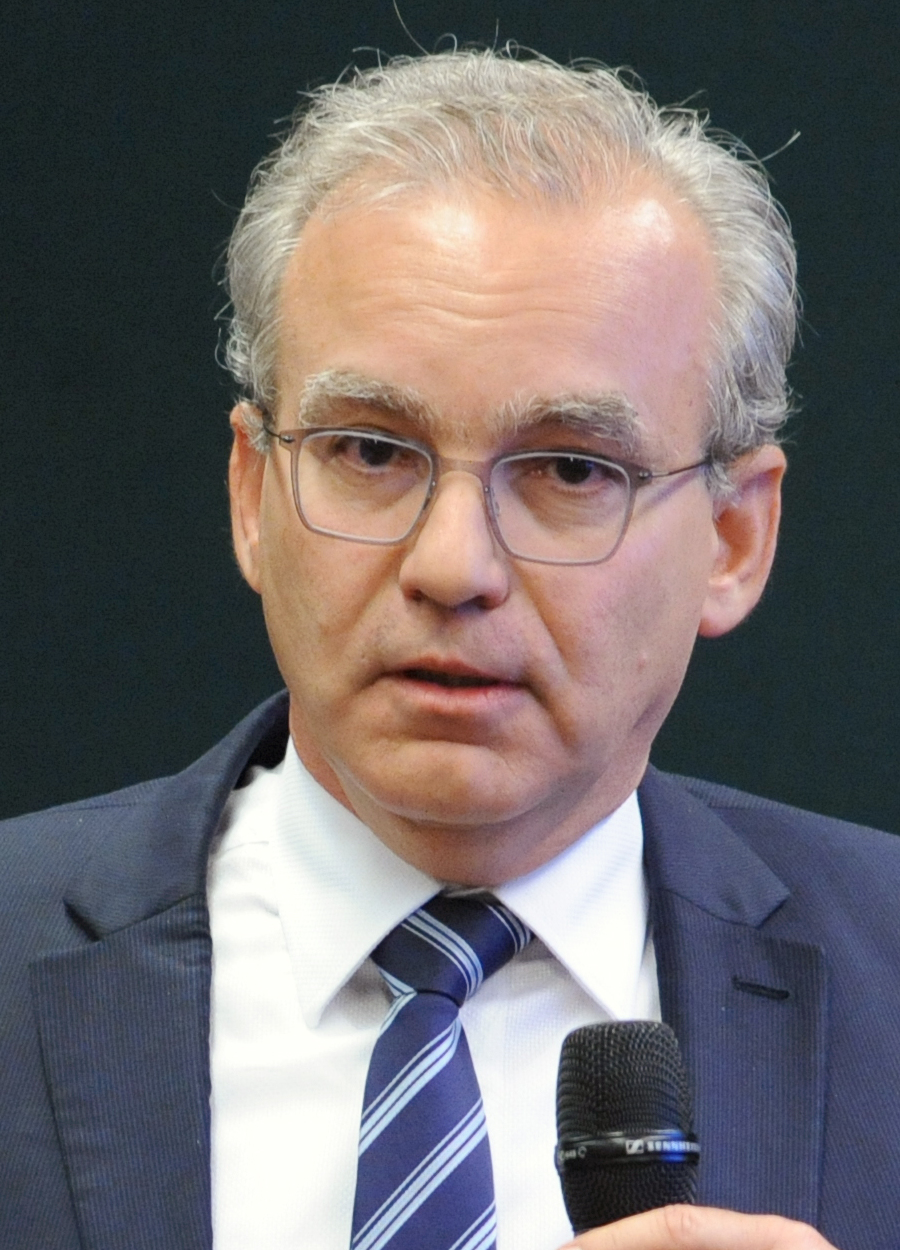
- Filho in 2019

Mayor of Teresina
- In office 1 January 2013 – 31 December 2020
- Preceded by: Sílvio Mendes
- Succeeded by: José Pessoa Leal
- In office 1 January 1997 – 31 December 2004
- Preceded by: Francisco Gerardo
- Succeeded by: Sílvio Mendes

Member of the Legislative Assembly of Piauí
- In office 1 January 2011 – 31 December 2012

President of the Municipal Health Foundation of Teresina
- In office 1 January 2009 – 31 December 2010

Municipal Councillor of Teresina
- In office 1 January 2009 – 31 December 2010

Municipal Secretary of Finance of Teresina
- In office 1993–1996

Personal details
- Born: 16 December 1963 Teresina, Piauí, Brazil
- Died: 6 April 2021 (aged 57) Teresina, Piauí, Brazil
- Party: PDSB
- Children: Bárbara do Firmino
- Relatives: Breno Macedo (son-in-law)

Firmino da Silveira Soares Filho (16 December 1963 – 6 April 2021) was a Brazilian economist and politician. A member of the Brazilian Social Democracy Party, he served as Mayor of Teresina from 1997 to 2004 and again from 2013 to 2020. With three terms, he matched the amount of his predecessor, Raimundo Wall Ferraz. He also served on the Legislative Assembly of Piauí.

== Biography ==
Filho graduated from the Federal University of Pernambuco with a degree in economics. He earned his master's degree from the University of Illinois. Subsequently, he worked for the Tribunal de Contas da União and as a professor for the Federal University of Piauí.

Filho began his political career at the age of 30 in 1993, when he was appointed by Mayor of Teresina Raimundo Wall Ferraz to become Municipal Secretary of Finance. After the Mayor's death on 22 March 1995, Filho kept his administrative position under the leadership of Francisco Gerardo.

A member of the Brazilian Social Democracy Party, Filho was elected Mayor of Teresina in 1996, defeating Alberto Tavares Silva of the Brazilian Democratic Movement in the second round. Filho was one of the youngest mayors in Brazil and defeated his previous opponent's son, Marcos Silva in 2000. He received the Amigo da Criança award from UNICEF and the Fundação Abrinq, awarded by UNICEF ambassador Daniela Mercury in 1999.

Filho was heavily concerned with development of Teresina's working class residents. He introduced the Vila-Bairro project, which greatly improved quality of life on the outskirts of the city. It was recognized as a great success by Caixa Econômica Federal, which recommended the practice to the United Nations in a 2000 conference in China. As a result of this development, he received awards from the United Nations Human Settlements Programme, the Ford Foundation, the Fundação Getulio Vargas, the Brazilian Development Bank, and others.

In 2006, two years after he left the post of Mayor, Filho ran for Governor of Piauí, where he was defeated by incumbent Governor Wellington Dias. In 2008, he was elected to serve on the Municipal Council of Teresina, achieving the second highest vote total for Teresina Municipal Council history, behind only Carlos Augusto de Araújo Lima in 1972.

Filho was elected to the Legislative Assembly of Piauí after earning 47,634 votes. In 2012, he defeated Wellington Dias in the first round and Elmano Férrer in the second, and once again assumed the office of Mayor of Teresina.

On 6 April 2021, Firmino Filho was found dead in Teresina, where he reportedly fell from the 14th floor of the Manhattan River Center, the location of his office with the Tribunal de Contas da União.
