= Rafael Fonteles =

Brazilian politician (born 1985)

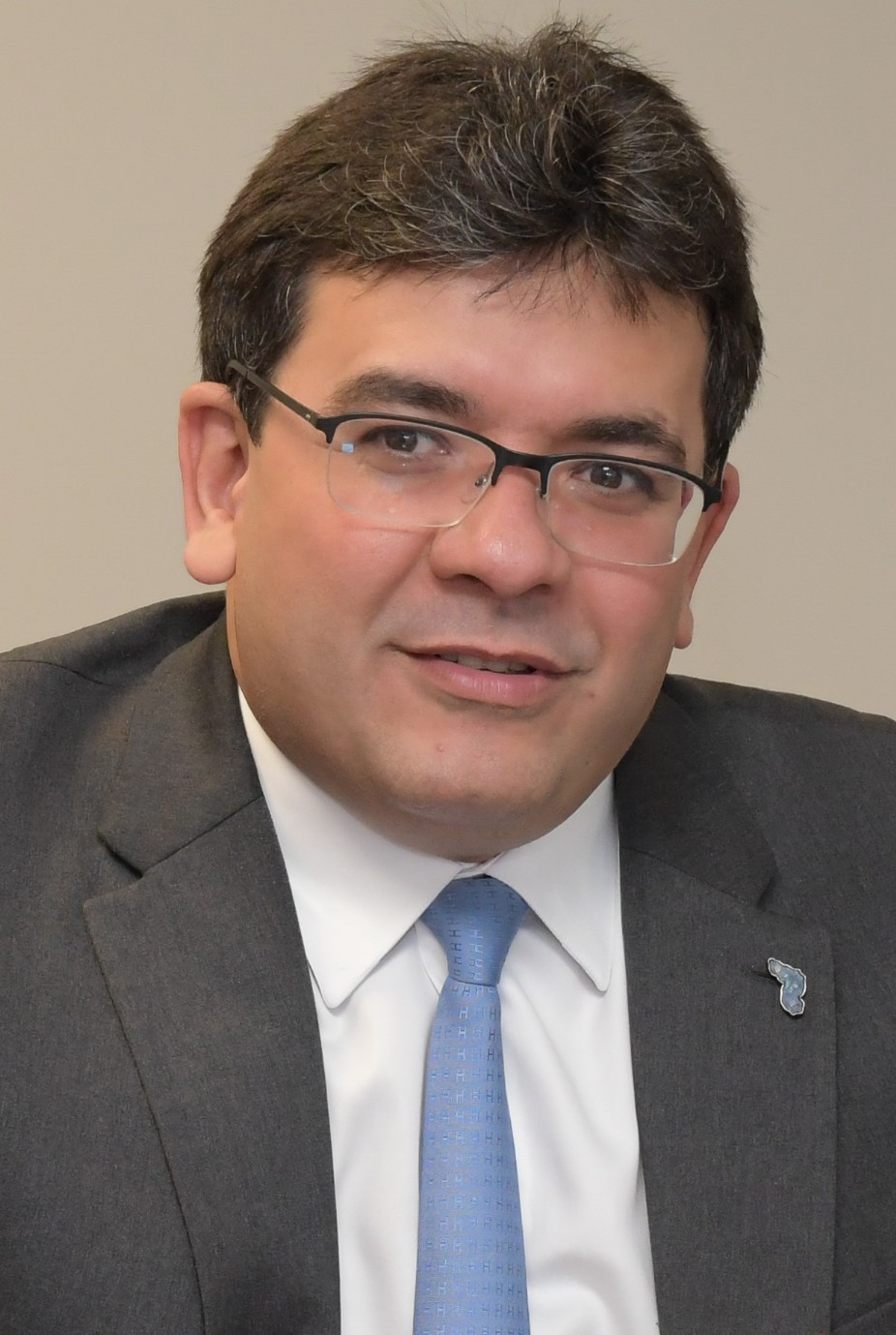
- Fonteles in 2025

Governor of Piauí
- Incumbent
- Assumed office 1 January 2023
- Vice Governor: Themístocles Filho
- Preceded by: Regina Sousa

Secretary of Finance of Piauí
- In office 1 January 2015 – 31 March 2022
- Governor: Wellington Dias
- Preceded by: Silvano Alencar
- Succeeded by: Emílio Júnior

Personal details
- Born: 6 May 1985 (age 41) Teresina, Piauí, Brazil
- Party: Workers' Party (since 2003)
- Spouse: Isabel Araújo (m. 2011)
- Children: 3
- Parents: Nazareno Fonteles (father); Nereira Tajra (mother)
- Education: Federal University of Piauí; Institute for Pure and Applied Mathematics

Rafael Tajra Fonteles (born 6 May 1985) is a Brazilian mathematician and politician, a member of the Workers’ Party (PT). In 2022, at the age of 37, he was elected governor of Piauí in the first round for the 2023–2027 term, becoming the youngest governor in the history of the state.

In 2015, he took office as State Secretary of Finance. In 2019, he was elected president of Comsefaz (National Committee of the Finance Secretaries of the States and the Federal District) for the 2019/2021 term. That same year, he was re-elected for the 2021/2023 term. In March 2022, however, he resigned from the position to run for governor of the state of Piauí for the PT, and was elected in the first round.

He is a partner and one of the founders of the Instituto de Ensino Superior (ICEV), a higher education institution focused on applied law, business, management, and technology. During his term as governor, he was responsible for the public-private partnership program for basic sanitation in Piauí.

== Education and professional career ==
Rafael Tajra Fonteles was born in Teresina, Piauí, on 6 May 1985. He is the son of physician and mathematician Nazareno Fonteles, a federal deputy for the Workers' Party (PT) and one of the party's founders in the state, and of nurse Nereida Tajra. He studied at Instituto Dom Barreto in Teresina, where he later worked as a mathematics teacher. During his schooling, he represented Brazil in international science competitions, winning a bronze medal at the 2002 International Chemistry Olympiad, held in the Netherlands, and an honorable mention at the International Physics Olympiad in Indonesia.

In 2002, at the age of 17, he placed first overall in the entrance examination of the Federal University of Piauí (UFPI), where he enrolled in the bachelor's program in mathematics. He completed the degree in 2004, at the age of 19, after two years of study, with top marks in all 29 courses, according to academic transcripts obtained by Folha de S.Paulo. That same year, he won a bronze medal at the International Mathematics Competition for University Students, held in what is now North Macedonia. He later earned a master's degree in mathematical economics from the Institute for Pure and Applied Mathematics (IMPA) in Rio de Janeiro.

In 2003, while still a university student, he founded a college entrance exam preparatory school in Teresina called Cursos Específicos para Vestibulares (CEV), initially focused on teaching mathematics, physics and chemistry. The venture gave rise to Grupo Educacional CEV, which began offering preparatory courses for civil service examinations in 2008 and opened its first school in 2010. In 2018, the group expanded into higher education with the opening of the Instituto de Ensino Superior (iCEV).

In addition to his work in education, Fonteles worked as an investment consultant registered with the Securities and Exchange Commission of Brazil (CVM). He also took part in a program on TV Clube, the TV Globo affiliate in Piauí, in which he gave advice on personal finance and investing. In January 2015, at the age of 29, he entered public administration when he took office as Piauí's Secretary of Finance at the invitation of Governor Wellington Dias.

== Awards and honors ==
Rafael is the only student in the world to have won awards at the International Physics, Chemistry and Mathematics Olympiads.

Year	Competition	Award	Ref.
2001	(Brazil) Brazilian Chemistry Olympiad (OBQ)	Gold medal	
2002	(Brazil) Brazilian Chemistry Olympiad (OBQ)	Gold medal	
2002	(Netherlands) 34th International Chemistry Olympiad (IChO)	Silver medal	
2002	(Argentina) 7th Ibero-American Chemistry Olympiad (OIAQ)	Silver medal	
2002	(India) 33rd International Physics Olympiad (IPhO)	Honorable mention	
2004	(North Macedonia) International Mathematics Competition for University Students (IMC)	Bronze medal	

== Electoral history ==
Year	Election	Party	Office	Coalition	Partners	Party	Votes	Percent	Result
2022	State Elections of Piauí	PT	Governor	A Força do Povo (PT, PCdoB, PV, PSB, PSD, PROS, Solidariedade, MDB, Agir)	Themístocles Filho	MDB	1,115,139	57.17	Elected
2026	State Elections of Piauí	PT	Governor	A Força do Povo (PT, PCdoB, PV, PSB, MDB, PDT, PSD, Republicanos)	Washington Bandeira	PT	1,436,697	70.90	Elected
