= List of mayors of Teresina =

Mayor of Teresina
- Flag of Teresina
- Incumbent; Sílvio Mendes since 1 January 2025
- Inaugural holder: João da Cruz e Santos
- Formation: 1 January 1880

The following is a list of mayors of the city of Teresina, in Piauí state, Brazil.

- João da Cruz e Santos, 1880-1887
- Mariano Gil Castelo Branco, 1887-1893
- Manoel Raimundo da Paz, 1893-1897
- Antônio Gonçalves Pedreira Portelada, 1897-1901
- Benjamim de Sousa Martins, 1901-1905
- Afonso Ribeiro de Albuquerque, 1905
- Domingos Monteiro, 1905-1909
- Emílio César Burlamaqui, 1909
- Adão de Medeiros Soares, 1909, 1910
- José Pires Rebelo, 1909-1910
- Tersandro Gentil Pedreira Paz, 1910-1917
- Antônio da Costa Araújo, 1917-1921
- Manoel Raimundo da Paz Filho, 1921-1924
- João da Cruz Monteiro, 1924-1925
- Anfrísio Lobão Veras Filho, 1925-1929
- Domingos Monteiro, 1929-1930
- Raimundo de Arêa Leão, 1930
- João Martins do Rego, 1930-1931
- Domingos Monteiro, 1931-1932
- Agenor Monte, 1932
- Luís Pires Chaves, 1932-1935
- Osvaldo da Costa e Silva, 1935
- Francisco do Rego Monteiro, 1935-1936
- Lindolfo do Rego Monteiro, 1936-1945
- José Martins Leite Pereira, 1945-1946
- Celso Pinheiro Filho, 1946
- Durvalino Couto, 1947
- Godofredo Freire da Silva, 1947-1948
- José Virgílio Castelo Branco da Rocha, 1948
- José Martins Leite Pereira, 1948
- José Ribamar de Castro Lima, 1948-1951
- João Mendes Olímpio de Melo, 1951-1955
- Agenor Barbosa de Almeida, 1955-1959
- Petrônio Portella, 1959-1963
- Hugo Bastos, 1963-1967
- Jofre Castelo Branco, 1967-1969
- Raimundo Bona Medeiros, 1969-1970, 1979-1982
- Wagner Saraiva de Lima, 1970
- Haroldo Borges, 1970-1971
- Joel Ribeiro, 1971-1975
- Wall Ferraz, 1975-1979, 1986-1988, 1993-1995
- Jesus Tajra, 1982-1983
- Antônio Freitas Neto, 1983-1986
- Heráclito Fortes, 1989-1992
- Francisco Gerardo, 1995-1996
- Firmino Soares Filho, 1997-2004, 2013-2020
- Sílvio Mendes, 2005-2010, 2025-
- Elmano Férrer, 2010-2012
- José Pessoa Leal, 2021-2024
- Sílvio Mendes, 2025-present

== See also ==
- Elections in Teresina (in Portuguese)
- List of mayors of largest cities in Brazil (in Portuguese)
- List of mayors of capitals of Brazil (in Portuguese)
