= Guilherme Melo (politician) =

Brazilian politician (1952–2021)

45th Governor of Piauí
- In office 30 March 1994 – 1 January 1995
- Preceded by: Antônio de Almendra Freitas Neto
- Succeeded by: Mão Santa

Vice-Governor of Piauí
- In office 15 March 1991 – 30 March 1994
- Preceded by: Lucídio Portela Nunes
- Succeeded by: Osmar Antônio de Araújo

Member of the Legislative Assembly of Piauí
- In office 1 February 1987 – 1 February 1991

Personal details
- Born: Guilherme Cavalcante de Melo; 25 June 1952 Teresina, Fourth Brazilian Republic
- Died: 21 April 2021 (aged 68) Teresina, Brazil
- Party: PDS; PPR; PP; PDT; PMDB

Guilherme Cavalcante de Melo (25 June 1952 – 21 April 2021) was a Brazilian politician, businessman, and lawyer. He served as Governor of Piauí, Vice-Governor of Piauí, and was a member of the Legislative Assembly of Piauí.

== Biography ==
Guilherme was the son of João Mendes Olímpio de Melo and Luzia Cavalcante Melo. He earned a degree in business from the University Center of Brasília and began working at Banco do Brasil the Central Bank of Brazil. He became an advisor to the Empresa Brasileira de Assistência Técnica e Extensão Rural and the Chamber of Deputies. He then earned a degree in law from the Federal University of Piauí in 1984.

Melo was a member of the Brazilian Democratic Movement (PMDB) before joining the Democratic Social Party (PDS) and serving in the government of Hugo Napoleão do Rego Neto but stepped down and was elected to the Legislative Assembly of Piauí in 1986. In 1990, he was chosen to run as Vice-Governor of Piauí alongside Antônio de Almendra Freitas Neto, who became Governor. Melo became governor in 1994 when Neto resigned to seek a seat on the Brazilian Senate.[7] He left the Governorship the following year after he declined to seek re-election. In 2006, he ran for a seat on the Legislative Assembly of Piauí as a member of the Democratic Labour Party, but was unsuccessful.

Guilherme Melo died from brain cancer in Teresina on 21 April 2021, at the age of 68.
