= Guilherme Melo =

Guilherme Melo may refer to:

- Guilherme Melo (politician) (1952–2021), Brazilian politician
- Guilherme Melo (squash player) (born 1991), Brazilian squash player
