= 2014 Piauí gubernatorial election =

- October 5, 2014
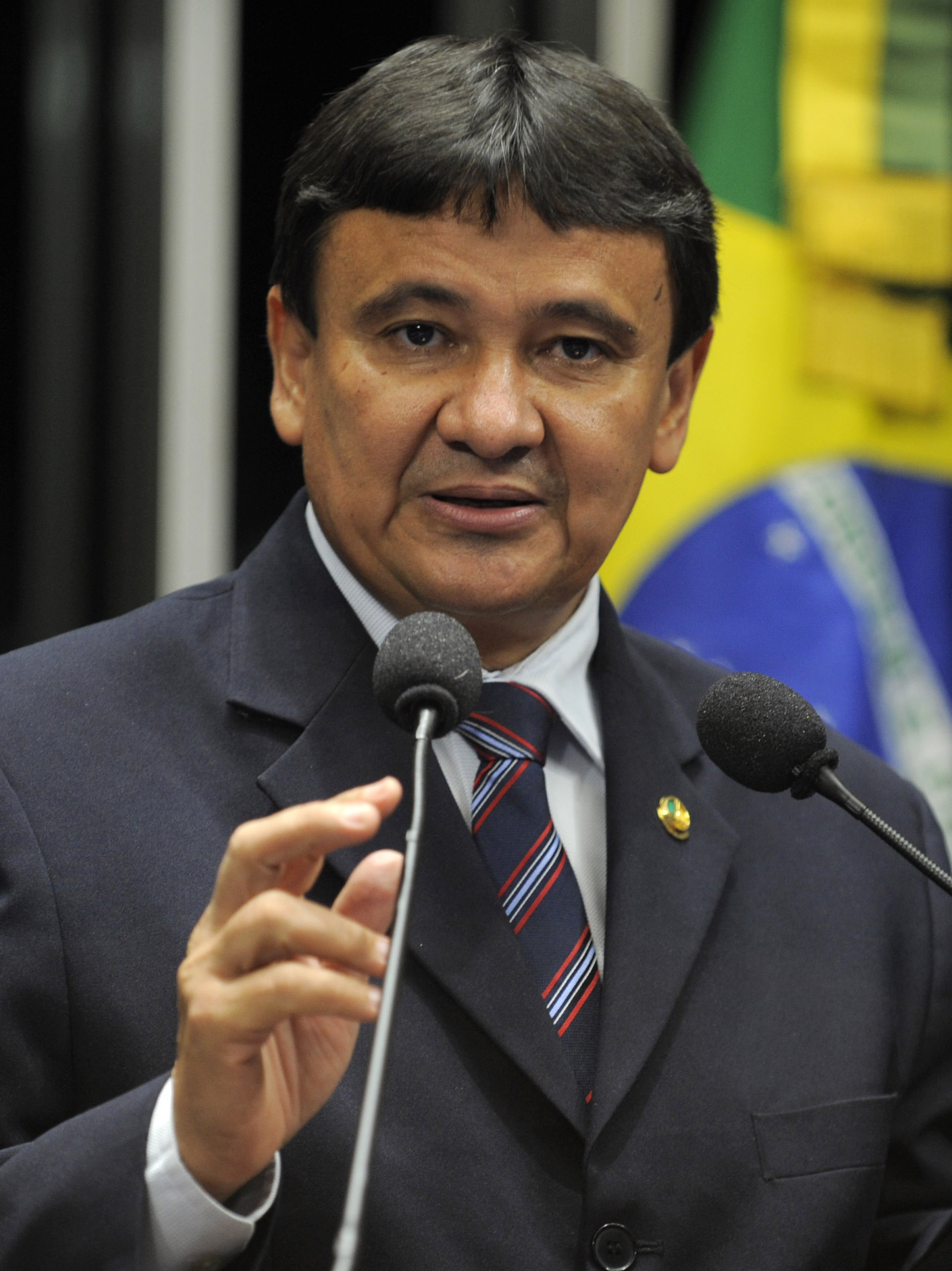

Nominee	Wellington Dias	Zé Filho (inc.)
Party	PT	MDB
Running mate	Margarete Coelho	Sílvio Mendes
Popular vote	1,053,342	555,201
Percentage	63.08%	33.25%
Governor before election
Moraes Souza Filho
MDB
Elected Governor
Wellington Dias
PT

The Piauí gubernatorial election was held on 5 October 2014 to elect the next governor of the state of Piauí. Governor Moraes Souza Filho ran for his first full term after becoming governor in 2014, but was resoundingly defeated by Senator Wellington Dias of the PT in the first round.

== Results ==
Piauí Gubernatorial Election
Party	Candidate	Votes	%	±%
PT	Wellington Dias	1,053,342	63.08%	
MDB	Zé Filho	555,201	33.25%	
PSC	Mão Santa	25,877	1.55%	
PSOL	Maklandel	22,480	1.35%	
PSTU	Daniel Solon	6,452	0.39%	
PPL	Neto Sambaíba	4,217	0.25%	
PCO	Lourdes Melo	2,180	0.13%	
Majority		498,141	29.83%	
PT gain from MDB		Swing		
