= Georgiano Neto =

Brazilian politician (born 1993)

Member of the Chamber of Deputies
- Assuming office 1 February 2027
- Constituency: Piauí

Member of the Legislative Assembly of Piauí
- Incumbent
- Assumed office 1 February 2015
- Constituency: At-large

Personal details
- Born: Georgiano Fernandes Lima Neto; 23 November 1993 (age 32) Teresina, Piauí, Brazil
- Party: PSD (2011–2022, 2026–present)
- Other political affiliations: MDB (2022–2026)
- Parent: Jussara Lima (mother)

Georgiano Fernandes Lima Neto (born 23 November 1993) is a Brazilian politician serving as a member of the Legislative Assembly of Piauí since 2015. He is the son of Júlio César and Jussara Lima.
