= Antônio José de Moraes Souza Filho =

Brazilian businessman and politician

Governor of Piauí
- In office April 4, 2014 – January 1, 2015
- Preceded by: Wilson Martins
- Succeeded by: Wellington Dias

Vice Governors of Piauí
- In office January 1, 2011 – April 4, 2014
- Preceded by: Wilson Martins
- Succeeded by: Margarete de Castro Coelho

Member of the Legislative Assembly of Piauí
- In office 2003–2011

Mayor of Parnaíba
- In office January 1, 1997 – January 1, 2001
- Preceded by: José Hamilton Furtado Castelo Branco
- Succeeded by: Paulo Eudes Carneiro

Personal details
- Born: February 13, 1970 (age 56) Parnaíba, Piauí, Brazil
- Party: Popular Socialist Party (since 2016)
- Other political affiliations: PFL (1990–1999); PSDB (1999–2004); PMDB (2004–2016)
- Spouse: Juliana Moraes Souza

Antônio José de Moraes Souza Filho, commonly known as Zé Filho, (born February 13, 1970 Parnaíba, Piauí) is a Brazilian businessman and politician. He served as Governor of the state of Piauí from 2014 to 2015 and Vice Governor of Piauí from 2011 until 2014.

Moraes Souza Filho was elected Vice Governor of Piauí in 2010 as the running mate of Governor Wilson Martins. Filho became the 51st Governor of Piauí on April 4, 2014, when Governor Martins resigned to run for the Federal Senate.

In 2014, Moraes Souza Filho ran for a full term in the Piauí gubernatorial election. However, he was defeated in the gubernatorial election by Senator and former Piauí Governor Wellington Dias in the first round on October 5, 2014. Dias won 63.08% of the vote, while Moraes Souza Filho placed second with 33.25%.
