= Wilson Martins (politician, 1953) =

Brazilian politician

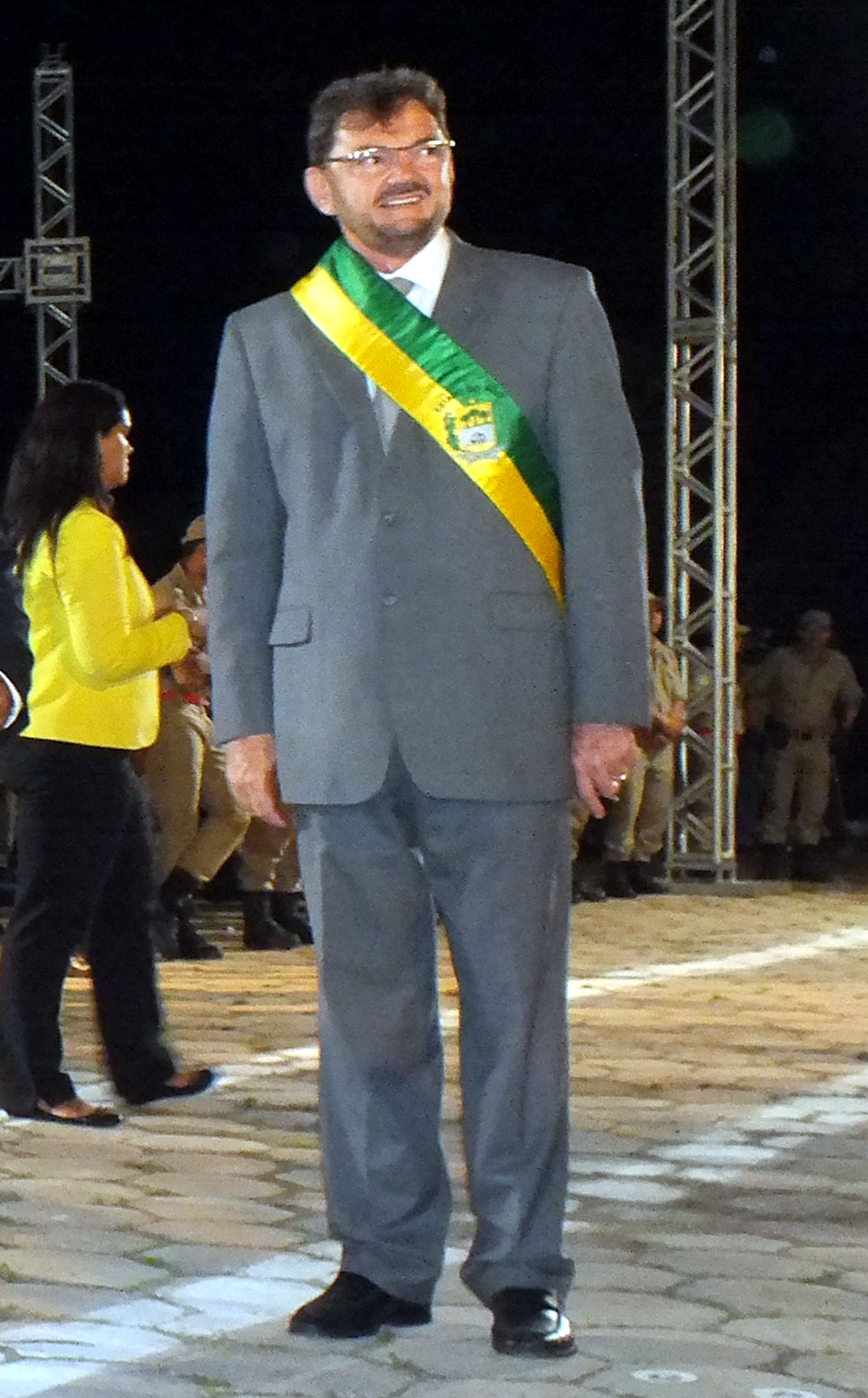

Member-elect of the Chamber of Deputies
- Assuming office 1 February 2027
- Constituency: Piauí

Governor of Piauí
- In office 1 April 2010 – 4 April 2014
- Vice Governor: Vacant (2010); Zé Filho (2011–2014)
- Preceded by: Wellington Dias
- Succeeded by: Zé Filho

Vice Governor of Piauí
- In office 1 January 2007 – 1 April 2010
- Governor: Wellington Dias
- Preceded by: Osmar Júnior
- Succeeded by: Zé Filho

Member of the Legislative Assembly of Piauí
- In office 1 February 1995 – 1 February 2007
- Constituency: At-large

Personal details
- Born: Wilson Nunes Martins; May 17, 1953 (age 73) Santa Cruz do Piauí, Piauí, Brazil
- Party: PSD (2025–present)
- Other political affiliations: PSDB (1995–2005); PSB (2005–2022); PT (2022–2025
- Relatives: Rodrigo Martins (nephew)
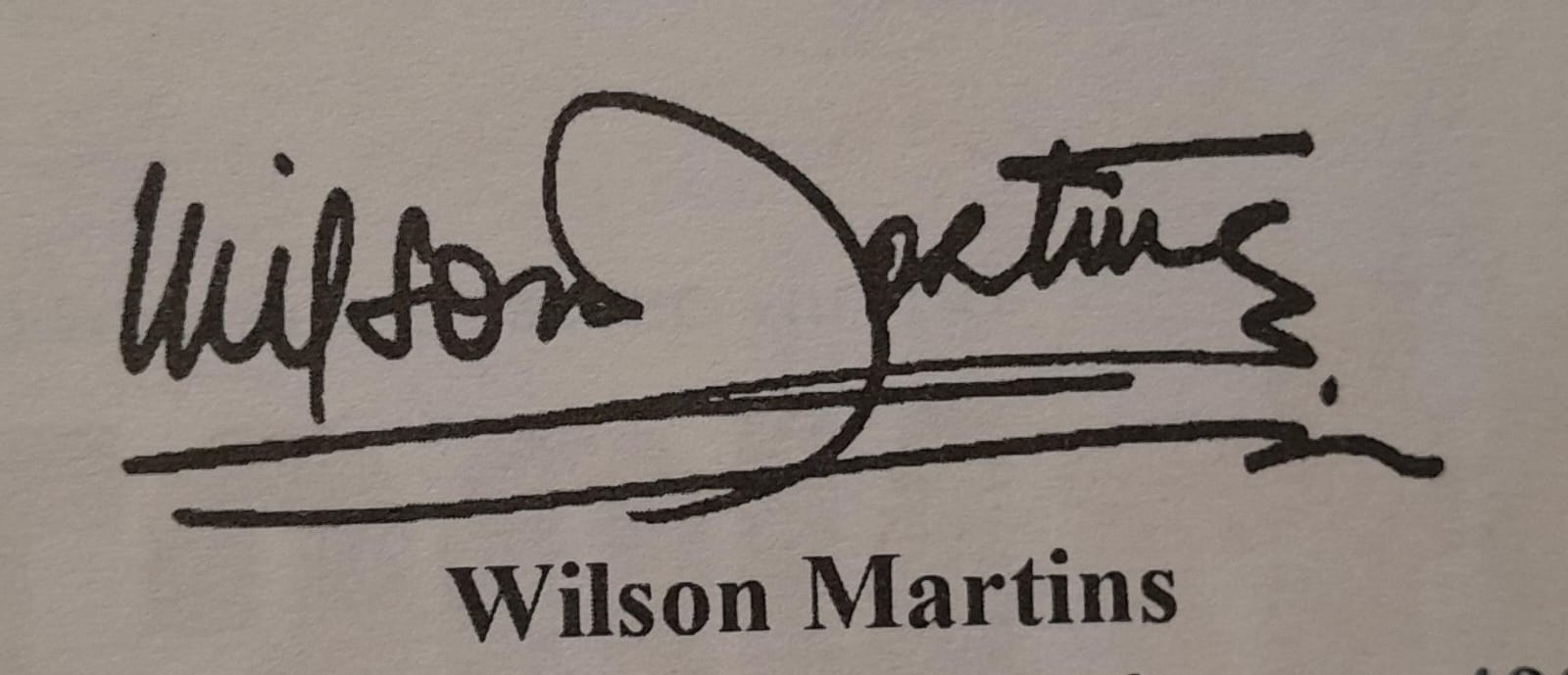
- Signature

Wilson Nunes Martins (born 17 May 1953) is a Brazilian politician and member of the Workers Party (PT). He served as Governor of Piauí from 1 April 2010, to 4 April 2014.

Political offices
Preceded by Osmar Júnior	Vice Governor of Piauí; 2007–2010	Vacant Title next held by Zé Filho
Preceded by Wellington Dias	Governor of Piauí; 2010–2014	Succeeded by Zé Filho
