= Margarete Coelho =

Brazilian lawyer and politician (born 1961)

Margaerete Coelho
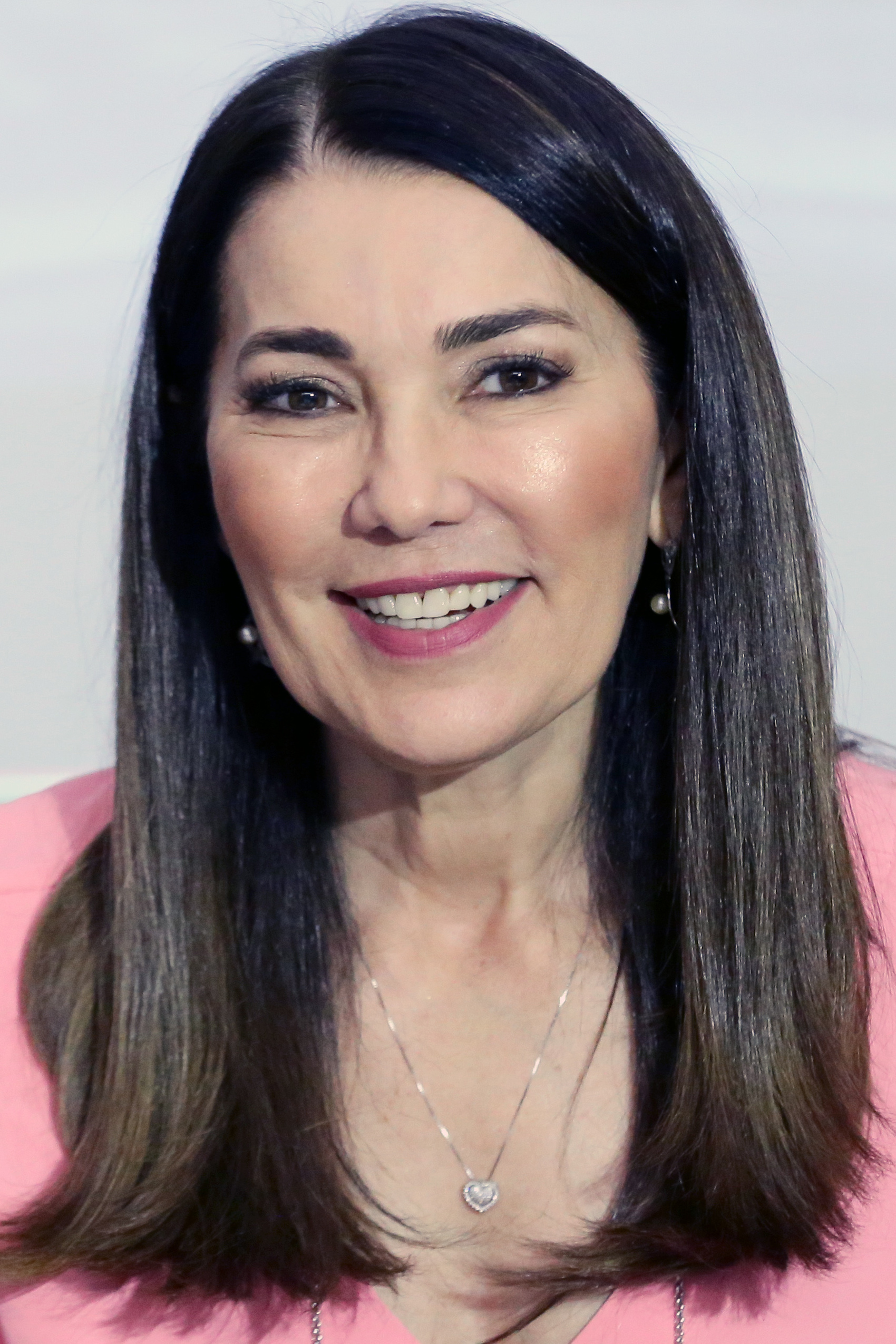

Federal Deputy for Piauí
- Incumbent
- Assumed office 1 January 2019

19th Vice Governor of Piauí
- In office 1 January 2015 – 31 December 2019
- Governor: Wellington Dias
- Preceded by: Antônio Moraes
- Succeeded by: Regina Sousa

Deputy for The State of Piauí
- In office 1 January 2011 – 31 December 2014

Personal details
- Born: 12 March 1961 (age 65) São Raimundo Nonato, Piauí Brazil
- Party: PP
- Spouse: Marcelo Coelho
- Education: State University of Piauí
- Profession: Lawyer

Margarete de Castro Coelho (São Raimundo Nonato, PI, March 12, 1961) is a Brazilian lawyer and politician, a federal deputy elected to represent Piauí. Affiliated to Progressistas, she fulfilled the mandate of vice-governor of Piauí between 2015 and 2019, having been the first woman elected in the state for the position.

== Biography ==
Daughter of Aloisio Rubem de Castro and Edvaldina Gonçalves de Castro. Specialist lawyer in Procedural Law from the Federal University of Santa Catarina, in Constitutional Law from the Federal University of Piauí and in Electoral Law, from the Electoral Judicial School of the Regional Electoral Court of Piauí in agreement with the Federal University of Piauí. She was a professor in the Law course at State University of Piauí. Married to Marcelo Coelho, she was his successor in the Legislative Assembly of Piauí and was elected state deputy in 2010 by the PP and in 2014 became the first woman to be elected vice-governor of Piauí.

In 2018, she was elected federal deputy.
