= Breno Macedo =

Brazilian politician (born 1993)

Member of the Legislative Assembly of Piauí
- Incumbent
- Assumed office 1 February 2027

Personal details
- Born: 14 June 1993 (age 33)
- Party: Green Party
- Spouse: Bárbara do Firmino (m. 2020)
- Relatives: Newton Macedo (grandfather); Waldemar Macedo (great-uncle); Firmino Filho (father-in-law); Lucy Soares (mother-in-law)

Breno Nunes Macêdo (born 14 June 1993) is a Brazilian politician who was elected member of the Legislative Assembly of Piauí in 2026. He is the grandson of Newton Macedo and the great-nephew of Waldemar Macedo. He is married to Bárbara do Firmino and the son-in-law of Firmino Filho and Lucy Soares.
