= 2024 Teresina mayoral election =

- October 6, 2024
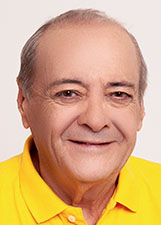

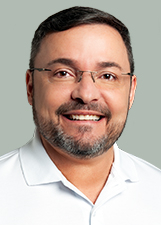
Nominee	Sílvio Mendes	Fabio Novo
Party	UNIÃO	PT
Alliance	Teresina on the Right Path	Together for Teresina
Running mate	Jeová Alencar	Paulo Márcio
Popular vote	239,848	198,794
Percentage	52.19%	43.26%
Mayor before election
Dr. Pessoa
PRD
Elected mayor
Sílvio Mendes
UNIÃO

The 2024 Teresina municipal election took place in the city of Teresina, Brazil on 6 October 2024. Voters elected a mayor, vice mayor, and 31 councillors.

The incumbent mayor is José Pessoa Leal or Dr. Pessoa of the Democratic Renewal Party. Dr. Pessoa was formerly elected mayor in 2020 as a member of the MDB.

Sílvio Mendes, the former mayor of Teresina from 2004 to 2010, lost the 2024 Piauí gubernatorial election to Rafael Fonteles. Mendes defeated Fonteles' candidate Favio Novo, his primary opponent, in the first round.

Popular vote (first round)
Mendes	52.19%
Fabio	43.26%
Dr. Pessoa	2.20%
Tony	1.34%
Others	1.01%
