= Jussara Lima =

Brazilian sociologist and politician

- Official portrait

Senator for Piauí
- Incumbent
- Assumed office 6 February 2023
- Preceded by: Wellington Dias

Vice-mayor of Fronteiras
- In office 12 October 2011 – 1 January 2013
- Preceded by: Norberto Ângelo Pereira Neto
- Succeeded by: Maria José Ayres de Sousa

Councilwoman of Fronteiras
- In office 1 January 1989 – 1 January 1993

Personal details
- Born: Antônia Jussara Gomes Alves de Sousa Lima; 5 December 1960 (age 65) Fronteiras, Piauí, Brazil
- Party: PFL (1987–2007); DEM (2007); PTB (2007–2015); PSD (2015–present)
- Spouse: Júlio César de Carvalho Lima
- Children: Georgiano Neto
- Education: Catholic University of Pernambuco

Antônia Jussara Gomes Alves de Sousa Lima (born 5 December 1960) is a Brazilian sociologist and politician who is a senator from the state of Piauí. She has been in the position since 2023, replacing Wellington Dias who became the Minister of Social Development. She had previously been the vice-mayor of and councilwoman in her hometown of Fronteiras. She is a member of the Social Democratic Party (PSD).

The daughter of José Alves de Sousa and Maria Gomes Alves de Sousa, she graduated from the Catholic University of Pernambuco and became a sociologist. She was elected as a councilwoman in Fronteiras as part of the Liberal Front Party (PFL) in 1988. The first woman elected to the city council, she served a term before running again to be vice-mayor in 2011. She was elected as part of the Brazilian Labour Party (PTB), with Eudes Agripino Ribeiro as the mayoral candidate. Due to family issues, she switched her affiliation to the PSD, losing reelection as vice-mayor in 2016.

Lima's husband is federal deputy Júlio César de Carvalho Lima and her son is state deputy Georgiano Neto. She was elected as the first substitute for Wellington Dias during the 2022 general elections, eventually succeeding him as he became a minister in the Lula cabinet.
