= Bárbara do Firmino =

Brazilian politician (born 1994)

Member of the Legislative Assembly of Piauí
- Incumbent
- Assumed office 1 February 2023

Personal details
- Born: 10 November 1994 (age 31)
- Party: Social Democratic Party (since 2025)
- Spouse: Breno Macedo (m. 2020)
- Parents: Firmino Filho (father); Lucy Soares (mother)

Barbara Carvalho da Silveira Soares Macêdo (born 10 November 1994), better known as Bárbara do Firmino, is a Brazilian politician serving as a member of the Legislative Assembly of Piauí since 2023. She is the daughter of Firmino Filho and Lucy Soares.
