= Luiz Gonzaga Paes Landim =

Brazilian politician (1941–2021)

Member of the Legislative Assembly of Piauí
- In office 1979–1991

Personal details
- Born: 31 May 1941 São João do Piauí, Piauí, Brazil
- Died: 23 May 2021 (aged 79) Teresina, Piauí, Brazil
- Party: National Renewal Alliance; Democratic Social Party; Democrats; Liberal Party

Luiz Gonzaga Paes Landim (31 May 1941 – 24 May 2021) was a Brazilian lawyer, professor and politician.

== Biography ==
He served three terms as a deputy of the Legislative Assembly of Piauí and was superintendent of Sudene.
