= José Odon Maia Alencar =

Brazilian judge, lawyer and politician

Governor of Piauí
- In office August 12, 1966 – September 12, 1966
- Preceded by: Petrônio Portella
- Succeeded by: Helvídio Nunes de Barros

Member of the Legislative Assembly of Piauí
- In office 1963–1967

Mayor of Pio IX
- In office 1959–1962
- Preceded by: José Ferreira de Alencar Mota
- Succeeded by: José Ferreira de Alencar Mota

Personal details
- Born: October 6, 1928 Picos, Piauí, Brazil
- Died: June 13, 2017 (aged 88) Teresina, Piauí
- Party: National Democratic Union; ARENA
- Profession: Lawyer

José Odon Maia Alencar (October 6, 1928 – June 13, 2017) was a Brazilian judge, lawyer, and politician. He served as the acting Governor of Piauí from August to September 1966.

Odon was born on October 6, 1928, in the city of Picos, Piauí. He received his bachelor of law and social sciences degree from the Faculdade de Direito do Piauí. Odon Maia Alencar served as the mayor of the city of Pio IX from 1959 to 1962.

He was then elected to the state Legislative Assembly of Piauí beginning in 1963, where he rose to become the President of the Legislative Assembly. In 1966, in his capacity as Legislative President, Odon became the acting Governor of Piauí from August 12, 1966, until September 12, 1966.

In 1967, Odon was appointed to the Court of Auditors of the State of Piauí (Tribunal de Contas do Estado do Piauí), where he served until he retired from the court in 1998. He simultaneously served as the President of the Court of Auditors from 1981 until 1993.

José Odon Maia Alencar died at the Hospital São Marcos in Teresina, Piauí, on June 13, 2017, at the age of 88. He had been hospitalized for several days. A public memorial service was held for him in the auditorium of the state Court of Auditors.
