= Palace of the Counts of Redondo =

- Palácio dos Condes de Redondo (Portuguese)
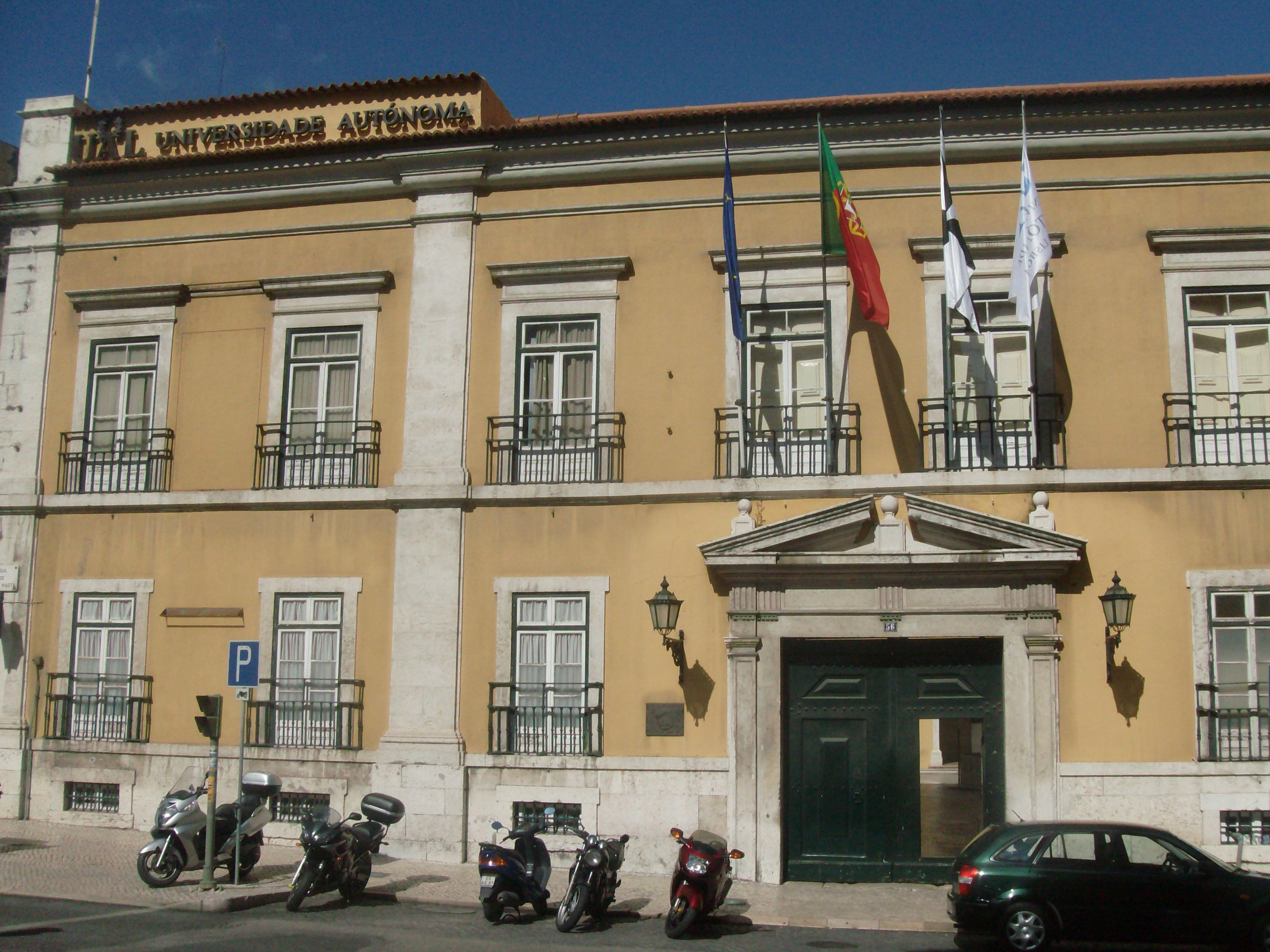
- Palace of the Counts of Redondo

- Location within Portugal
- 38.7243°N 9.1458°W
- Location: Lisbon, Portugal

Site notes
- Architectural style: Baroque
- Governing body: Universidade Autónoma de Lisboa

Portuguese National Monument
- Official name: Palácio dos Condes de Redondo
- Type: Property of Interest

The Palace of the Counts of Redondo (Portuguese: Palácio dos Condes de Redondo) is a Portuguese palace located in Lisbon, Portugal.

== History ==
The palace has its origins in the seventeenth century, having been constructed by the count of Redondo. In 1686, ownership of the palace passed shortly to the Portuguese Crown, being passed over again in 1693 to D. Manuel Coutinho.

The 1755 Lisbon earthquake caused no damage to the building which allowed improvements and remodeling to occur in the eighteenth century.

In 1939, the southern wing of the palace suffered a fire, but was later rebuilt.

The palace is currently the seat of the Universidade Autónoma de Lisboa.

== Architecture ==
The Baroque palace is in a rectangular conformation and composed of four wings around a courtyard square plan. The façade is composed of seven bodies, separated by pilasters, with two floors with two rows of twenty-two windows.

Access to the courtyard is through an archway open to the street.

== Sources ==
- Sistema de Informação para o Património Arquitectónico: Palácio dos Condes de Redondo (In Portuguese)
- Pesquisa de Património: Palácio dos Condes de Redondo (In Portuguese)
