= Rodrigo Martins (politician) =

Brazilian politician (born 1982)

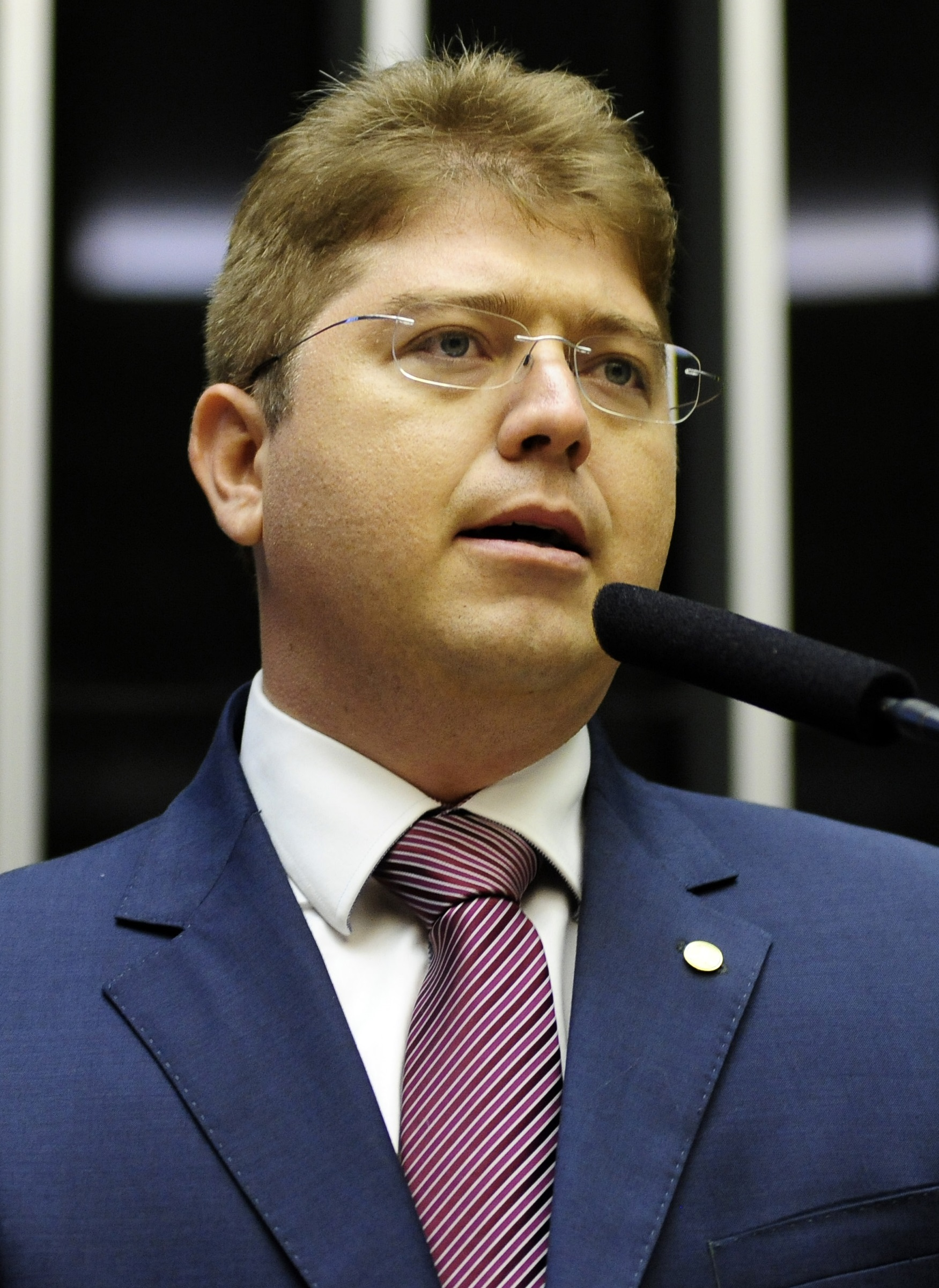
- Martins in 2015

Member of the Chamber of Deputies
- In office 1 February 2015 – 31 January 2019
- Constituency: Piauí

Personal details
- Born: 2 August 1982 (age 43)
- Party: Brazilian Socialist Party
- Relatives: Wilson Nunes Martins (uncle); Rubem Martins (uncle)

Rodrigo Rodrigues de Souza Martins (born 2 August 1982) is a Brazilian politician. From 2015 to 2019, he was a member of the Chamber of Deputies. He is the nephew of Wilson Nunes Martins and Rubem Martins.
