= 1966 in Brazilian television =

This is a list of Brazilian television related events from 1966.

== Launches ==
Network	Type	Launch date	Notes	Source
TV Borborema	Terrestrial	14 March		

== Births ==
- 13 June - Adriana Colin, model, TV host & journalist
- 13 November - Fernando Rocha, journalist & TV host

== See also ==
- 1966 in Brazil
