= Gonçalo Lobo Pinheiro =

Portuguese photojournalist

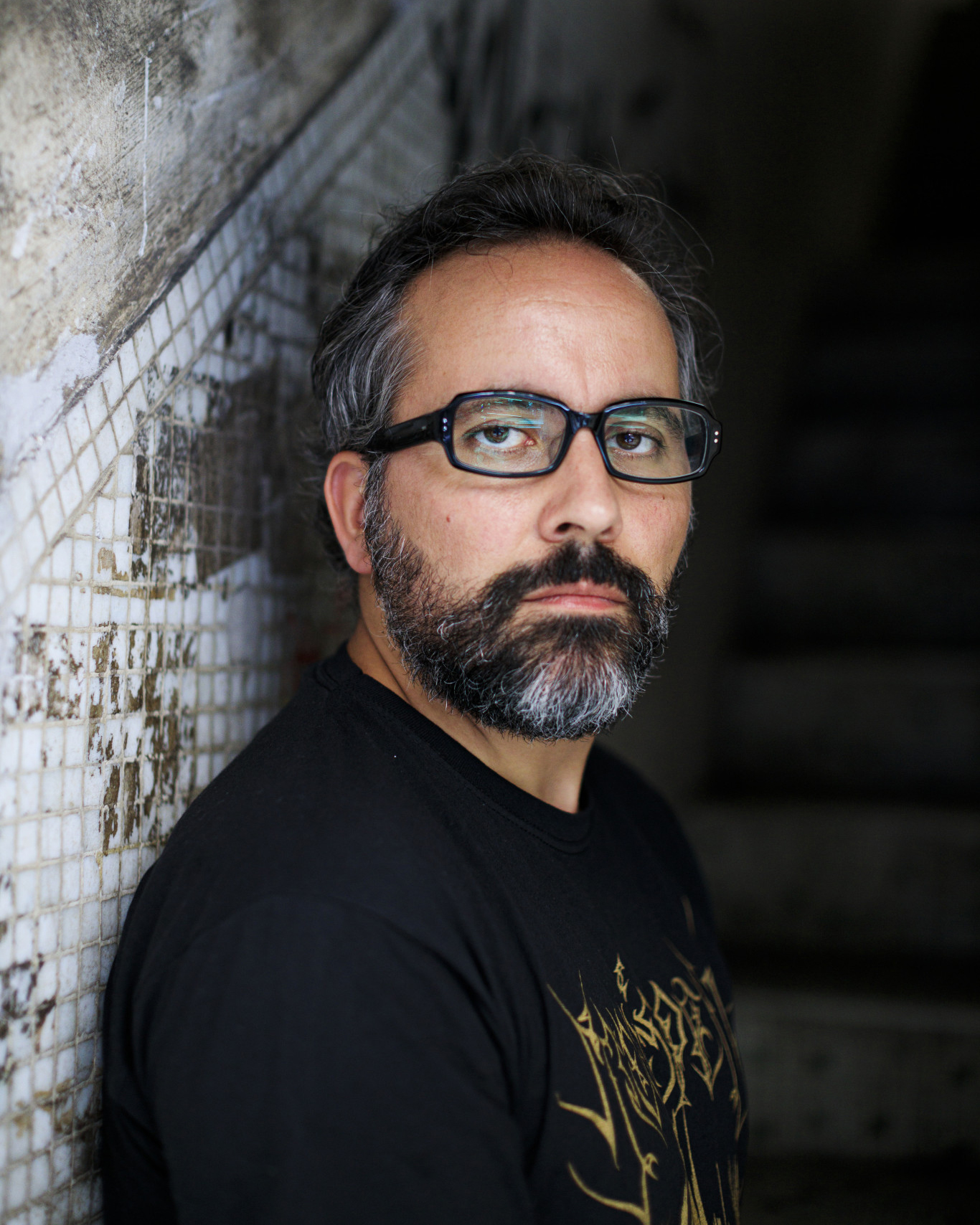
- Gonçalo Lobo Pinheiro in 2020
- Born: April 4, 1979 (age 47); Alfama, Lisbon, Portugal
- Education: Universidade Autónoma de Lisboa
- Occupations: Photojournalist; Documentary Photographer
- Website: www.goncalololobopinheiro.com

Gonçalo Lobo Pinheiro (born April 4, 1979) is a Portuguese photojournalist and documentary photographer, living in Macau, China. He has won several awards.

== Work ==
In 2021, Pinheiro partnered with the Chinese skateboard brand Maven and Macau-based skateboard store Exit to make a line of three skateboards and apparel dedicated to Macau. In 2022, he represented Macau in the ninth edition of the iNstantes – Avintes International Photography Festival in Portugal, with the black-and-white series Perto de mim, made in 2021. He has combined photography with human rights and social causes, supporting various social projects and NGOs.

== Publications ==
=== Publications by Pinheiro ===
- 2015: Macau 5.0 | 澳門 5.0 | Macao 5.0. Macao. ISBN 978-99965-909-7-9.
- 2019: Myanmar: o retrato de um povo. Rui Cunha Foundation, Macao. ISBN 978-99965-370-2-8.
- 2021: Desvelo • 關愛 • Zeal. Ipsis Verbis, Macao. ISBN 978-99965-341-4-0
- 2021: Tonle Sap. Artisan Raw, Brazil. ISBN 978-65-994509-0-7
- 2022: O que foi, não volta a ser.... Ipsis Verbis, Macao. ISBN 978-99965-341-6-4.
- 2023: Um vislumbre de luz • 一瞥光亮 • A glimpse of light. Ipsis Verbis, Macao.

=== Publications with others ===
- 2012: The Harmony of Disability. Macau Sports Press Association, Macao. ISBN 978-99965-894-1-6.
- 2013: Antologia Luso-Brasileira de Fotografia Contemporânea – Volume IV – 'Essência e Memória'. Chiado Editora, Portugal. ISBN 978-989-51-0583-0.
- 2020: Everydaycovid. Diários fotográficos em estado de emergência. Portugal. ISBN 978-989-33-1036-6.
- 2020: The Other Hundred - Healers. Global Institute For Tomorrow, Hong Kong.
- 2021: #ICPConcerned: Global Images for Global Crisis. International Center of Photography and Glitterati, USA. ISBN 978-1-943876-22-8.
- 2021: Era uma vez Jorge Sampaio - Histórias e imagens. Tinta-da-China, Portugal. ISBN 978-989-671-656-1.

== Awards ==
- 2007: 1st place, Liberty Best Moment category, Liberty Seguros Photojournalism Awards
- 2019: Finalist and Editors' favorite submission, National Geographic Travel Photos Contest
- 2019: Winner, Latin American Fotografía 8, American Illustration and American Photography (AI-AP)
- 2020: Winner, series category, "Macau 2020 - A Time for Introspection", Macau Closer
- 2021: Bronze, Press/Sports category, Prix de la Photographie, Paris (PX3)
- 2021: Winner and "Best of Best", Photography Masterprize Award - Architecture Masterprize
- 2022: Silver, Prix de la Photographie, Paris (PX3)
- 2022: Gold, People / Family category, Budapest International Foto Awards, International Awards Inc.
- 2023: 8th edition Open Call winner, Poster Mostra
- 2023: Bronze, Prix de la Photographie, Paris (PX3)
- 2023: 1st place, winner essay category, Festival Internacional de Fotografia Paraty em Foco
- 2023: 3rd place, Special/Other category, International Photography Awards (IPA)
- 2023: 1st place, editorial/other and architecture/cityscape categories, Neutral Density Photography Awards (ND)
- 2024: Award of Excellence, POY Asia - Pictures of the Year Asia 2024
- 2024: Silver, The Prix de la Photographie Paris (PX3)
- 2024: Bronze, Budapest International Foto Awards
- 2025: Silver, Tokyo International Foto Awards
- 2025: Gold, Budapest International Foto Awards
