= Autonomous University of Lisbon =

Portuguese academic publisher

- Universidade Autónoma de Lisboa
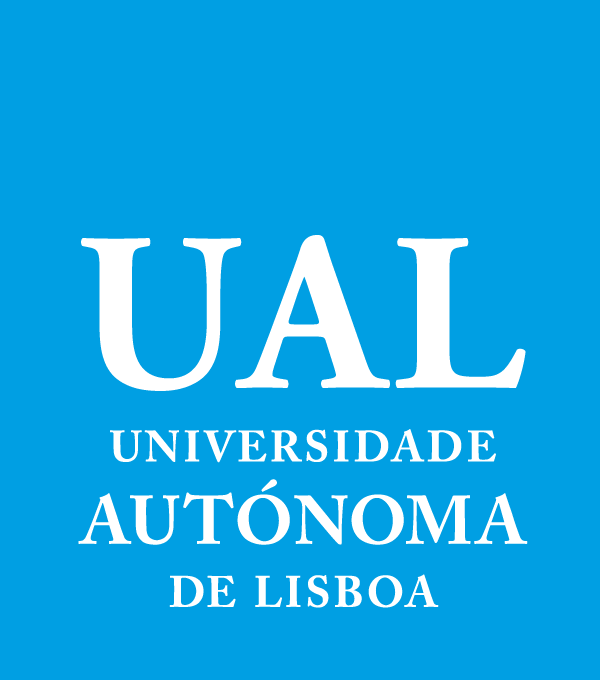
- Other names: UAL
- Motto: A Única Universidade no Centro de Lisboa
- Motto in English: The only university in the centre of Lisbon
- Type: Private University
- Established: 1985
- Rector: Professor Dr. José Amado da Silva
- Academic staff: 405
- Students: 4500
- Location: Lisbon, Portugal; 38°43′28″N 9°08′45″W
- Website: autonoma.pt

Universidade Autónoma de Lisboa (UAL; Autonomous University of Lisbon) is a private university located in Lisbon, the capital of Portugal. UAL was founded on December 13, 1985.

Its seat is in the Palace of the Counts of Redondo.

== History ==
The Autonomous University of Lisbon is a private university recognized by the Portuguese government.

The university was created by the Cooperativa de Ensino Universitário (CEU) on December 13, 1985, which is responsible for the economic and financial management of the university.

As mentor of the project, the CEU has participated in the creation of mechanisms that allow for the conception of research as a methodological process and source of knowledge, acting in the field of postgraduate degrees, through activities, both in the acquisition of academic degrees and in the achievement of skills for the world of work.

The university provides advanced training for doctoral and master's students, under the Educational Development Program for Portugal (Prodep II). UAL also has a range of support services in the didactic-pedagogical sphere, as well as in the area of support services, namely: Access to food in canteens and bars, prints, bibliographic and computer support, exemption or reduction of tuition fees, insurance scholarships, support for internships and management of careers or sporting and cultural activities.

In 2015, it served as the setting for the recordings of the TVI soap opera «A Única Mulher».

== Erasmus ==
The Institutional International Relations Office (GRII) coordinates UAL's participation in international student and teacher mobility programs and networks through the Erasmus program, and protocols with universities outside Europe, with particular emphasis on Brazil.

Mobility students have the possibility of receiving a monthly scholarship whose value varies depending on the country (minimum scholarship: 200 Euros/month), they do not pay fees at the host universities and receive a 50% reduction in the fees they continue to pay at UAL. Students who go to Brazil, or other countries outside Europe with which UAL is registered, do not receive a scholarship because it is an extra Erasmus mobility, but have a 75% reduction in the payment of tuition fees at UAL.

== Notable alumni ==
- José Jorge Letria
- António José Seguro
- Carla Tavares
- José Carlos Malato
- Inês Sousa Real
- Amílcar Bengla Mourão
- Rita Ferro Rodrigues
- Cristina Ferreira
- Maria da Luz Antunes
- Carolina Reis
- Teresa A. Oliveira
- Carlos Carranca
- Hugo Horta
- Tiago Barroso
- Susana Leal
- Gonçalo Lobo Pinheiro
- Telma de Mattos Ruas
- Nunes Marques
- Rita Pereira
- Elena Casacuberta
- Reginaldo Rodrigues de Almeida
- João Viseu
- Susana Lopes
- Vítor Gonçalves
- Fernanda Almeida
- Helena Pinheiro de Melo
- Paulo Nunes dos Santos

== Gallery ==
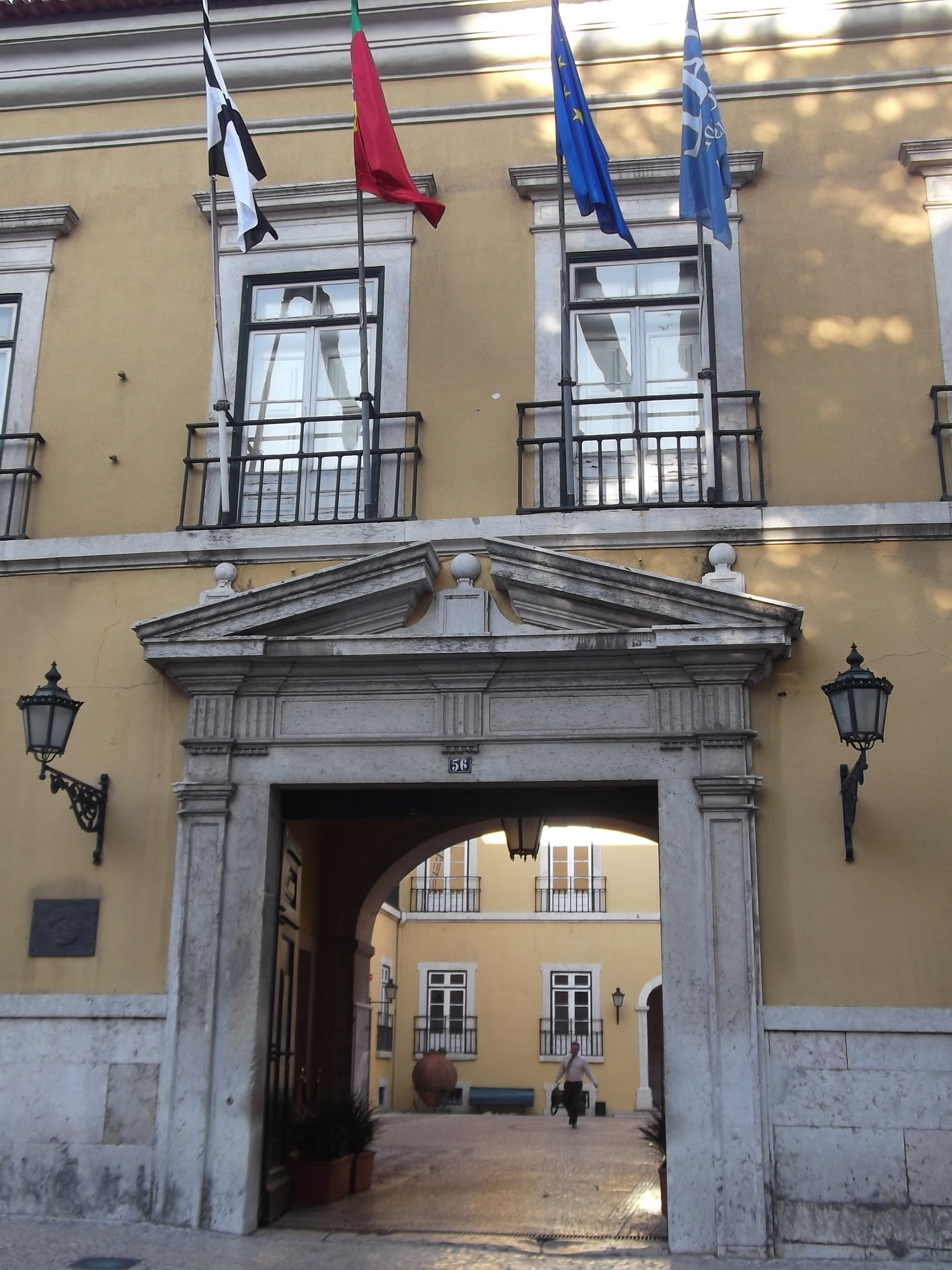
Entrance
