= Regina Sousa =

Brazilian politician

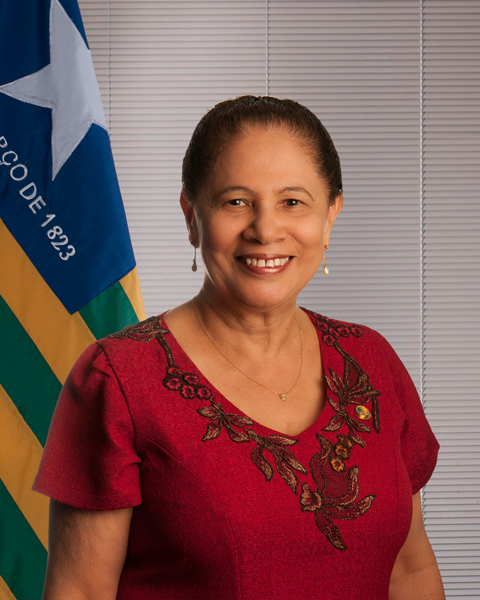

Secretary of Social Assistance, Labor and Human Rights of Piauí
- Incumbent
- Assumed office 1 January 2023
- Governor: Rafael Fonteles
- Preceded by: Zé Santana

Governor of Piauí
- In office 31 March 2022 – 31 December 2022
- Vice Governor: None
- Preceded by: Wellington Dias
- Succeeded by: Rafael Fonteles

Vice Governor of Piauí
- In office January 1, 2019 – March 31, 2022
- Governor: Wellington Dias
- Preceded by: Margarete Coelho
- Succeeded by: Themístocles Filho

Senator for Piauí
- In office January 1, 2015 – December 14, 2018

State Secretary of Administration of Piauí
- In office January 1, 2003 – January 1, 2011
- Governor: Wellington Dias

Personal details
- Born: July 4, 1950 (age 76) União, Piauí, Brazil
- Party: PT (1980–present)
- Education: Federal University of Piauí
- Profession: Banker

Maria Regina Sousa (born July 4, 1950) is a Brazilian politician who served as Governor of Piauí between March and December 2022. A member of the Workers' Party (PT), Sousa previously as Vice Governor from 2019 until her predecessor Wellington Dias' resignation in 2022.

Sousa served as secretary of state of Piauí from 2003 to 2011. From 2015 to her resignation in 2018, Sousa represented Piauí in the Federal Senate. Since January 2023 has served as Secretary of Social Assistance, Labor and Human Rights of Piauí.

== Biography ==
Sousa is a former employee of the Bank of Brazil and served as the secretary of State of Piauí in the first two governments of Wellington Dias. She has presided over the Bankers' Union and the Single Central Workers’ Union (CUT) in Piauí.

In the 2010 state elections in Piauí, she was elected the first alternate senator. She is currently president of the PT in Piauí and on January 1, 2015, assumed the term of senator with the election of Wellington Dias as governor of Piauí. In November 2015, she voted against the arrest of Delcídio Amaral. In October 2017, she voted against maintaining the mandate of Senator Aécio Neves, showing himself favorable to the decision of the First Panel of the Supreme Federal Court in the case where he is accused of corruption and obstruction of justice for requesting R$ 2 million from businessman Joesley Batista. During her term in the Federal Senate, she chaired the Commission on Human Rights and Participatory Legislation (HRC).

In the 2018 elections, she was elected vice-governor of Piauí on the Wellington Dias ticket. On December 14, 2018, she resigned as a senator and took on the coalition's second deputy, Zé Santana (MDB)

Political offices
Preceded by Margarete Coelho	Vice Governor of Piauí; 2019–2022	Succeeded by Themístocles Filho
Preceded by Wellington Dias	Governor of Piauí; 2022–2022	Succeeded by Rafael Fonteles
