= Petrônio Portella =

Brazilian lawyer and politician (1925-1980)

- Portella in 1971

Personal details
- Born: 12 September 1925 Valença do Piauí, Piauí
- Died: 6 January 1980 (54 years old) Brasília, Distrito Federal
- Spouse: Iracema Portella Nunes
- Parents: Eustáquio Portella Nunes (father); Maria Ferreira de Deus Nunes (mother)
- Education: Universidade do Brasil
- Profession: Attorney

Petrônio Portella Nunes (12 September 1925 — 6 January 1980) was a Brazilian lawyer and politician who played a prominent role in fostering the political détente initiated by Presidents Ernesto Geisel and João Figueiredo. He was regarded as the "civilian leader of the dictatorship."

== Early life ==
Portella was born in Valença do Piauí in 1925, the son of Eustáquio Portella Nunes (who served as mayor of Valença do Piauí on two separate occasions) and Maria Ferreira de Deus Nunes. He moved to Teresina aged eleven with his parents to continue his studies. Portella then moved to Rio de Janeiro, where he worked as an employee of what is now the Brazilian Post and Telegraph Company, a job he held concurrently with his university studies. After earning a law degree from the Federal University of Rio de Janeiro (then known as the University of Brazil), Portella practiced law in Teresina and also served as a professor at the Technical School of Commerce of Piauí.

As a young man, Portella played an active role in student politics. He was the leader of "Reforma", the most active party in Rio de Janeiro, which was vying for control of the coveted CACO - the Cândido de Oliveira Academic Center - at the University of Brazil Law School.

== Political career ==
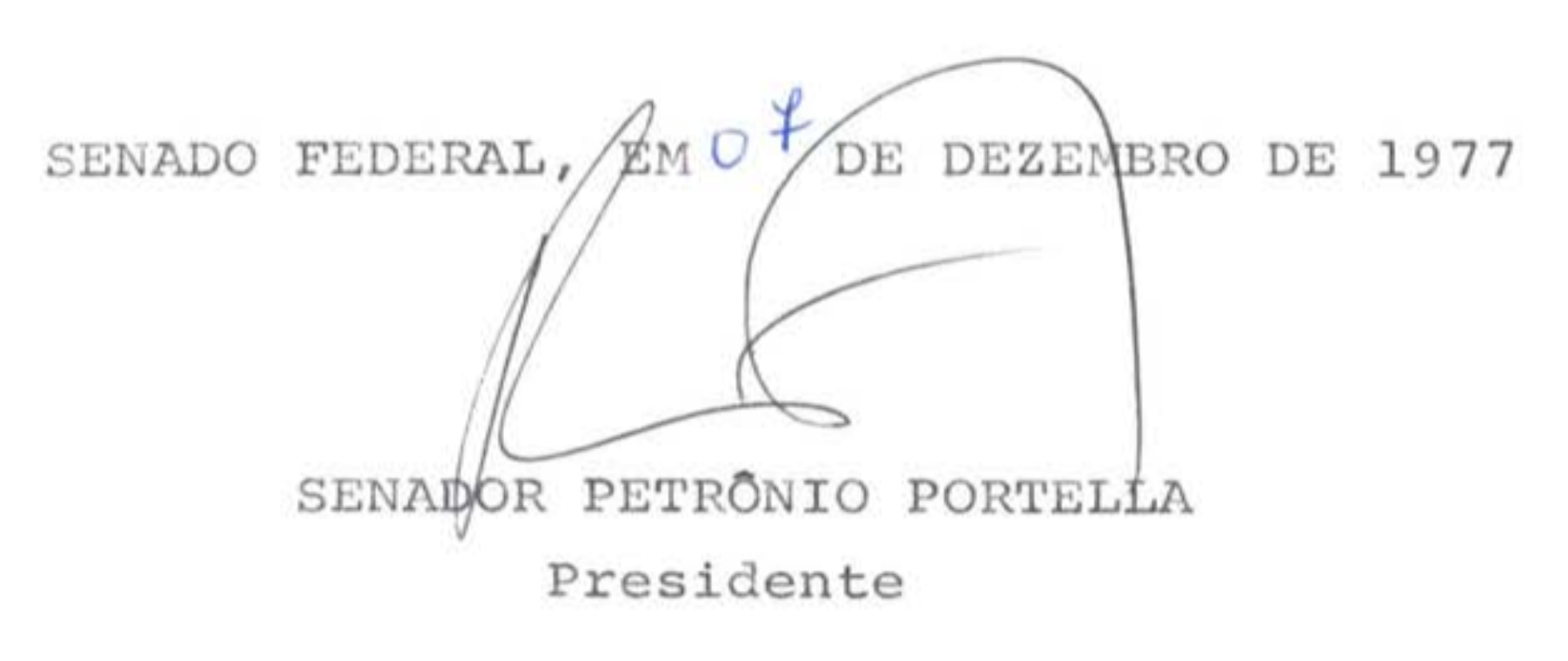
Signature as President of the Federal Senate in 1977.

Upon returning to Piauí, Petrônio Portella began providing legal advice to the National Democratic Union, the party he joined, and soon found himself immersed in the world of politics. He stood for election for the first time in 1950, when he was elected as an alternate state deputy, a position which led to him being called upon on a number of occasions to fulfil the role. In 1954, he was elected as a state deputy and, in 1958, he was elected mayor of Teresina, playing a key role in the election of Chagas Rodrigues as state governor. During his term as mayor of Teresina, he broke with Chagas and brought an end to the PTB/UDN alliance, which led him to form a coalition between his party and the PSD and paved the way for his election as governor of Piauí in 1962, defeating the state deputy Constantino Pereira de Sousa (PTB). It was during his tenure as head of the Piauí executive that a rebellion broke out within the Piauí Military Police in 1963, and the following year saw the establishment of the Military Regime, a movement to which he pledged his support, although he had initially opposed it, having initially supported João Goulart, he subsequently joined ARENA, the new ruling party, and was elected senator in 1966.

During his first term, Portella served as chair of the Constitution and Justice Committee, deputy leader of his parliamentary group and subsequently deputy leader of the government. Between 1971 and 1973, he was President of the Federal Senate and Chairman of ARENA’s national executive committee between 1973 and 1975, combining this latter role with his leadership of the Emílio Garrastazu Médici government in the Senate and of his party’s parliamentary group. Re-elected as a senator in 1974, he spearheaded the so-called ‘Portela Mission’, the first step in the policy of ‘gradual and safe détente’ undertaken by President Ernesto Geisel as part of his plans for political opening. Serving as President of the Federal Senate for a second term between 1977 and 1979, Portella was appointed Chair of the Senate’s Foreign Relations Committee in 1979, a post from which he stepped down on 15 March 1979 upon being appointed Minister of Justice by President João Figueiredo. During Portella's time away from office, the multi-party system was restored and the Amnesty Act was enacted, which helped to soothe national tensions regarding the consequences of the military regime. Owing to his ability to build consensus, Portella was tipped as one of the candidates for the presidential succession by the PDS; however, he died of a heart attack in Brasília on 6 January 1980.

== Successors ==
Following Portella's death, Bernardino Viana succeeded him as senator, whilst Ibrahim Abi-Ackel took over as Minister of Justice after Golbery do Couto e Silva had briefly held the post. Petrônio exerted influence by mentoring politicians from Piauí who went on to achieve national prominence and who remain active on the political scene to this day, such as member of the Federal Chamber of Deputies Hugo Napoleão do Rego Neto.

== Friends ==
Just for fun, Petrônio would meet up with friends at his country estate, ‘Chácara Valença’, in Brasília, on Saturdays, whilst he was a senator and later Minister of Justice. Among those joining him and his wife, Dona Iracema, were the writers H Dobal and Manoel Paulo Nunes, amongst others.

H Dobal expressed his despondency at the loss of his friend, noting:

"The small circle at Chácara Valença – the close-knit family club to whom he served cheerful wine, and the sparkle and liveliness of their conversations – is now nothing more than a memory of Saturdays gone by. " - H.Dobal

Paulo Nunes wrote:

" ...in the solitude of the Central Plateau, we formed a small, close-knit group centred around Petrônio, which would meet, almost always on Saturday afternoons, on the outskirts of the capital... These gatherings were characterised by the charming simplicity and grace of D. Iracema, his beloved companion and friend through thick and thin. "

== Family ==
At the start of his political career, Petrônio Portella was a staunch opponent of Governor Pedro Freitas, though this did not prevent him from marrying his political rival’s daughter. Two of his brothers were active in politics in Piauí: Lucídio Portela was appointed state governor in 1978 by the National Renewal Alliance and elected by the PDS as deputy in 1986 and as a senator in 1990, whilst Elói Portela was elected first alternate to Senator Freitas Neto in 1994, eventually serving the term between April 1998 and January 1999 when the incumbent was Extraordinary Minister for Institutional Reforms in Fernando Henrique Cardoso’s first government. His nephew, Marcelo Coelho, was elected as a state deputy in 1982, 1986, 1998 and 2002, always for the PDS and the parties that succeeded it. Meanwhile, his niece, Iracema Portella, was elected as a federal deputy in 2010.

== Honors ==
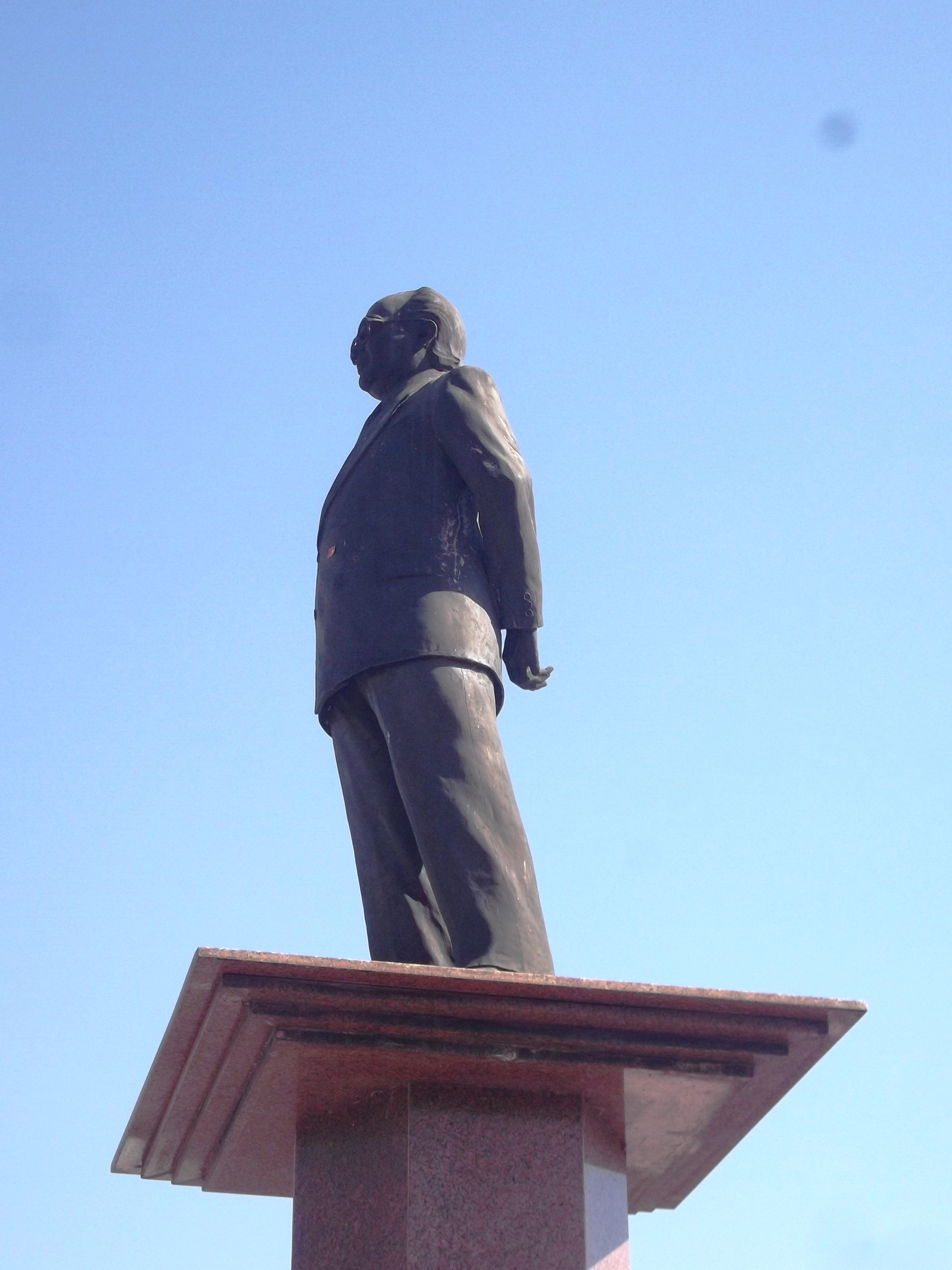
Statue on Avenida Frei Serafim, in Teresina.

Following his death, various tributes were paid in his memory, starting with the statue erected in his honour on Avenida Frei Serafim, the most traditional avenue in Teresina. His name was used to name schools such as the Senador Petrônio Portella State School in Manaus, as well as the main building of the Piauí Legislative Assembly and Teresina Airport. For a brief period, the municipality of Nova Santa Rita was named after him, but the original name was reinstated at the request of the local population. There is also a plaque in his honour, dating from 1972, recognising him as a distinguished student and President of the Federal Senate, in the staircase hall on the second floor of the National Law School building at the Federal University of Rio de Janeiro – the institution from which he graduated and which occupies the former headquarters (1824–1926) of the Senate of the Empire and the Republic. The city of São Paulo honoured him by naming an avenue after him, which connects the districts of Freguesia do Ó and Brasilândia, both located in the North Zone of the capital.

Preceded by Tibério Nunes	Governor of the State of Piauí; 1963 — 1966	Succeeded by José Odon Maia Alencar
Preceded by Joaquim Parente	Senator from Piauí; 1967 — 1979	Succeeded by Bernardino Viana
Preceded by João Cleofas	President of the Federal Senate of Brazil; 1971 — 1973	Succeeded by Filinto Müller
Preceded by Magalhães Pinto	President of the Federal Senate of Brazil; 1977 — 1979	Succeeded by Luís Viana Filho
Preceded by Armando Falcão	Minister of Justice of Brazil; 1979 — 1980	Succeeded by Golbery do Couto e Silva
