= Rejane Dias =

Brazilian politician (born 1972)

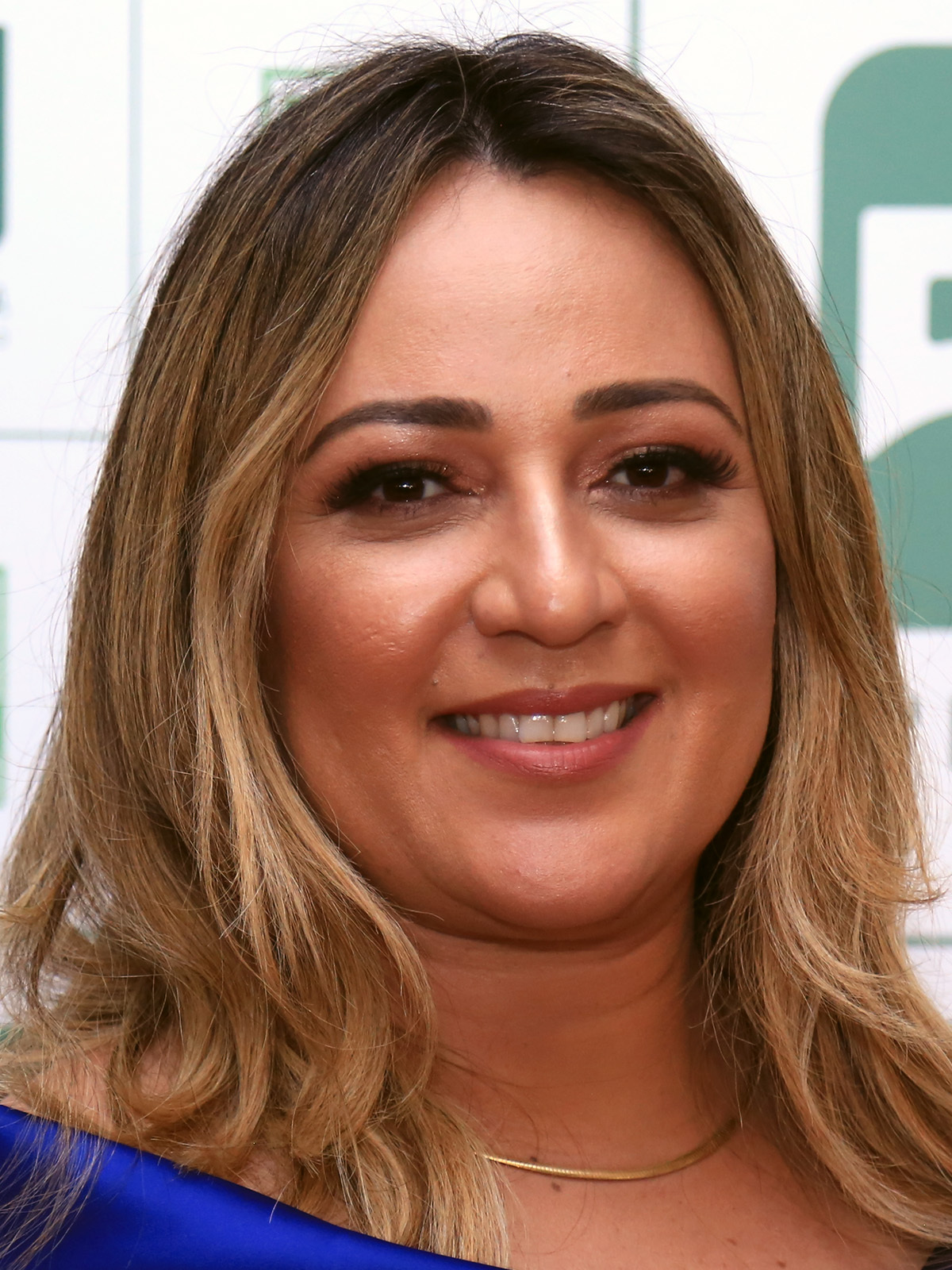
- Dias in 2019

Member of the Chamber of Deputies
- In office 1 February 2015 – 12 January 2023
- Constituency: Piauí

Personal details
- Born: 4 September 1972 (age 53)
- Party: Workers' Party (1993–2023)
- Spouse: Wellington Dias

Rejane Ribeiro Sousa Dias (born 4 September 1972) is a Brazilian politician serving as a counsellor of the Court of Accounts of Piauí since 2023. From 2015 to 2023, she was a member of the Chamber of Deputies. She is married to Wellington Dias and served as first lady of Piauí during his tenure as governor.
