= Elmano Férrer =

Brazilian politician and lawyer

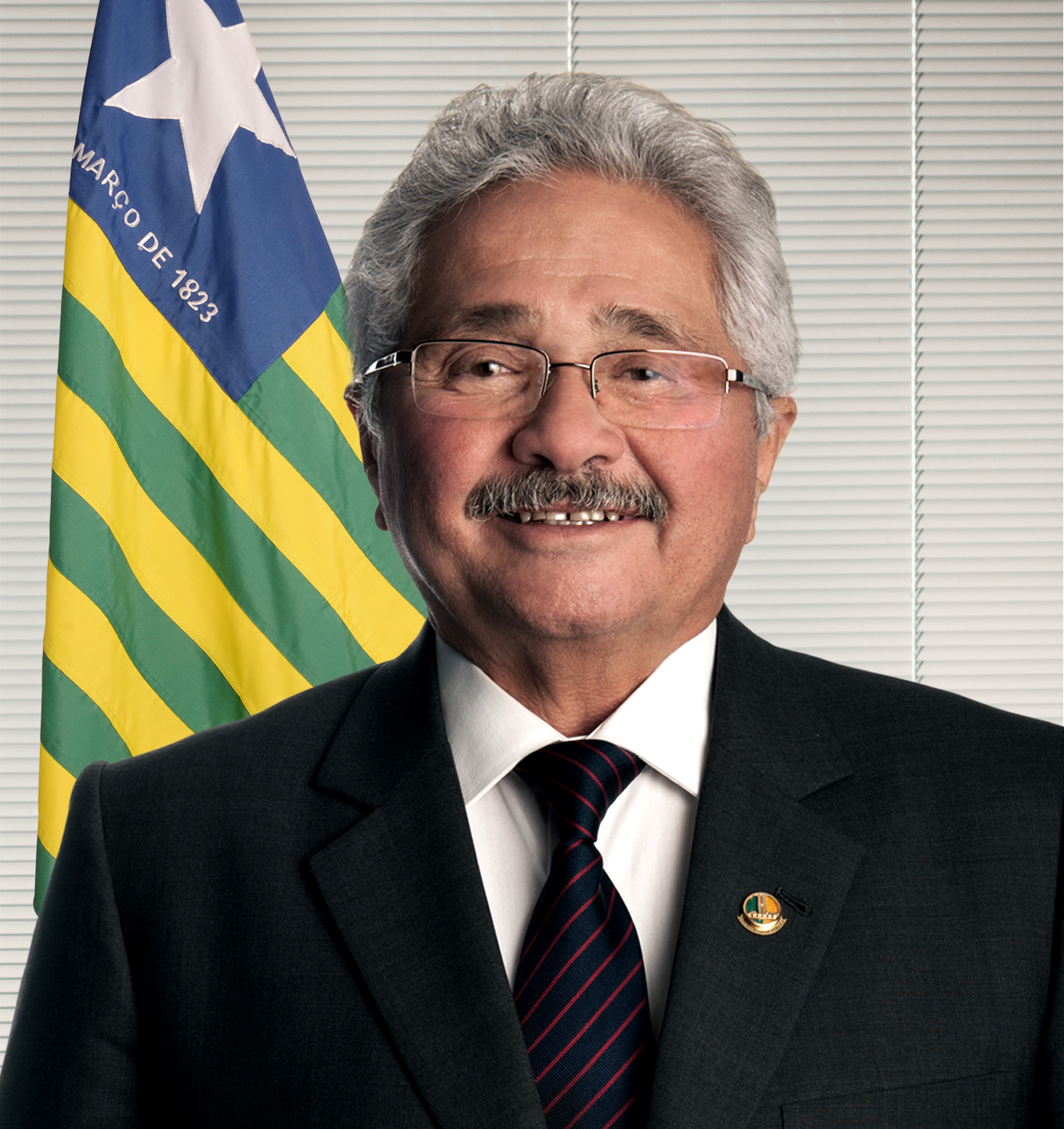

Senator for Piauí
- In office February 1, 2015 – February 1, 2023

Mayor of Teresina
- In office March 31, 2010 – January 1, 2013
- Vice Mayor: Vacant
- Preceded by: Sílvio Mendes
- Succeeded by: Firmino Filho

Vice Mayor of Teresina
- In office January 1, 2005 – March 31, 2010
- Mayor: Sílvio Mendes
- Preceded by: Marcos Silva
- Succeeded by: Ronney Lustosa

Personal details
- Born: August 1, 1942 (age 84) Lavras da Mangabeira, Ceará, Brazil
- Party: PP (2020–present)
- Other political affiliations: PTB (1999–2017); MDB (2017–18); PODE (2018–20)
- Spouse: Telezila Fortes
- Education: Federal University of Ceará
- Profession: Lawyer

Elmano Férrer (born August 1, 1942) is a Brazilian politician and lawyer. He has represented Piauí in the Federal Senate from 2015 to 2023. Previously he was mayor of Teresina from 2010 to 2013. He is a member of Progressistas (PP).

== See also ==
- List of mayors of Teresina

Political offices
| Preceded by Marcos Silva | Vice Mayor of Teresina; 2005–10 | Vacant Title next held by Ronney Lutosa |
| Preceded by Sílvio Mendes | Mayor of Teresina; 2010–13 | Succeeded by Firmino Filho |
