= Wellington Dias =

Wellington Dias may refer to:

- Wellington Dias (politician), full name José Wellington Barroso de Araújo Dias (born 1962), former governor of Piauí state
- Wellington Dias (footballer), full name Wellington Vicente Dias (born 1977)
- Wellington Leal Dias Santos (born 1967), known as Megaton Dias, Brazilian jiu-jitsu practitioner
