= Washington Bandeira =

Brazilian politician (born 1984)

- Bandeira in 2026

Vice Governor of Piauí
- Assuming office 6 January 2027
- Governor: Rafael Fonteles
- Succeeding: Themístocles Filho

Personal details
- Born: 23 October 1984 (age 41)
- Party: Workers' Party

Francisco Washington Bandeira Santos Filho (born 23 October 1984) is a Brazilian politician who was elected vice governor of Piauí in 2026. From 2023 to 2025, he served as secretary of education of Piauí.
