= Lavras da Mangabeira =

Municipality in Ceará, Brazil

Coordinates: 6°45′S 38°57′W

- Municipality
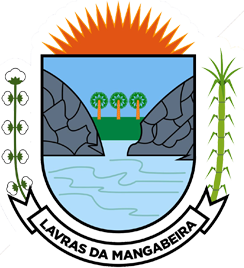
- Flag Coat of arms
- Interactive map of Lavras da Mangabeira
- Country: Brazil
- Region: Nordeste
- State: Ceará
- Mesoregion: Centro-Sul Cearense

Population (2020)
  - Total: 31,492
- Time zone: UTC−3 (BRT)

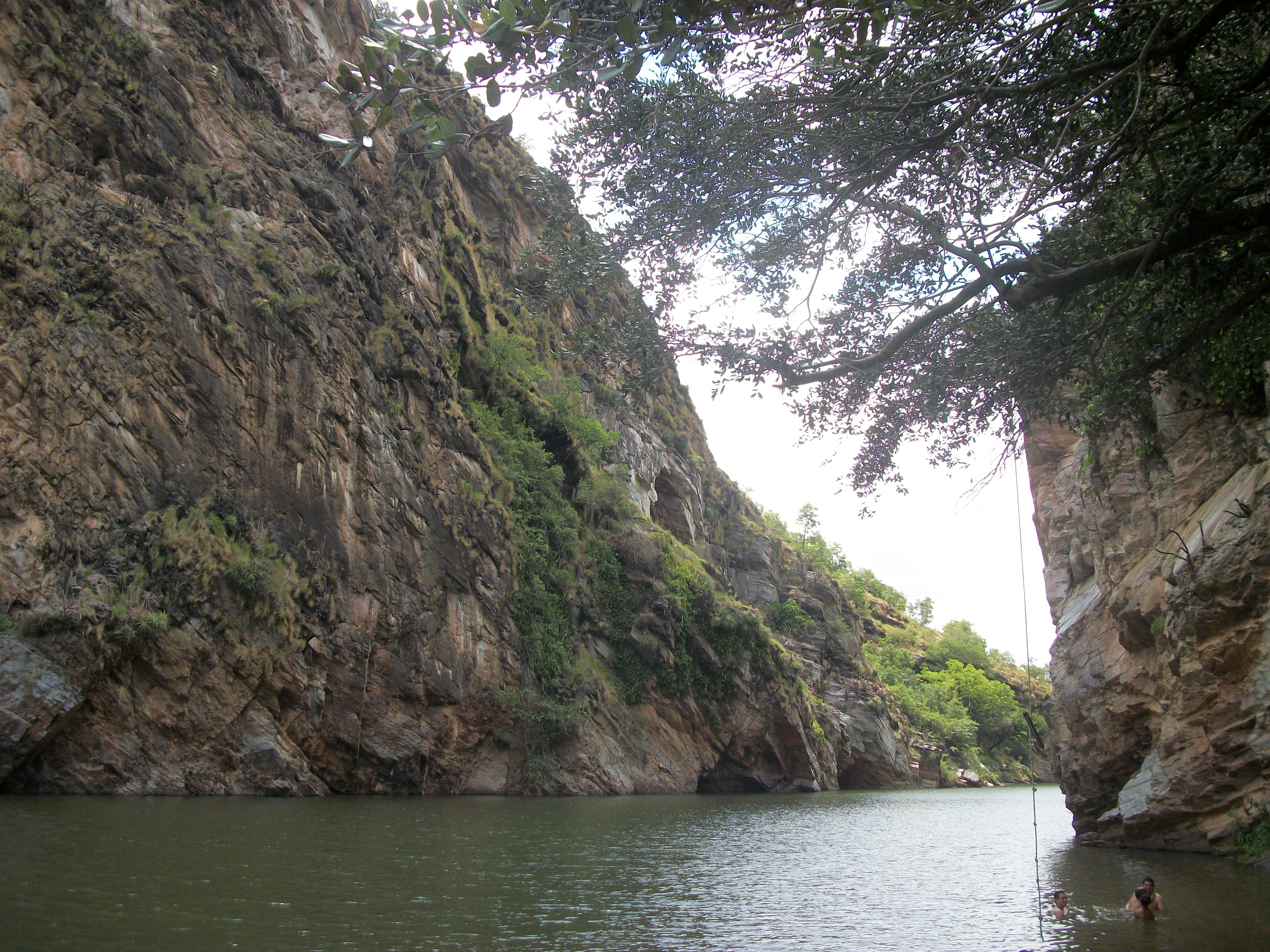
Boqueirão do Rio Salgado tourist attraction in Lavras da Mangabeira, Ceará, Brazil

Lavras da Mangabeira (Portuguese pronunciation: [ˈlavɾɐz da mɐ̃gaˈbejɾɐ]) is a municipality in the state of Ceará in the Northeast region of Brazil.

== See also ==
- List of municipalities in Ceará
