= Fronteiras =

Coordinates: 7°05′S 40°37′W

- Municipality
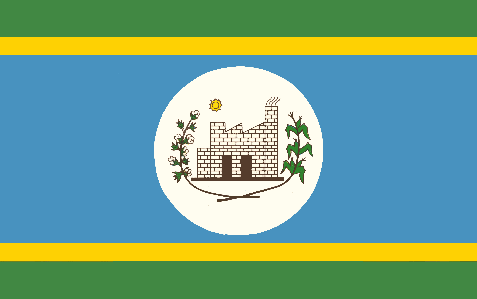
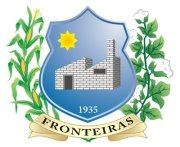
- Flag Coat of arms

- Country: Brazil
- Region: Nordeste
- State: Piauí
- Mesoregion: Sudeste Piauiense
- Elevation: 1,398 ft (426 m)

Population (2020)
  - Total: 11,659
- Time zone: UTC−3 (BRT)

Fronteiras is a municipality in the state of Piauí in the Northeast region of Brazil.

== See also ==
- List of municipalities in Piauí
