= Suzana Cavalheiro =

Brazilian footballer

Personal information
- Date of birth: 14 April 1966 (age 60)
- Place of birth: São Paulo, Brazil
- Position: Fullback

International career
Years	Team	Apps	(Gls)
- Brazil

Suzana Cavalheiro (born April 14, 1966) is a Brazilian former footballer who played as a fullback for the Corinthians and Clube Atlético Juventus.

== International career ==
Cavalheiro represented Brazil at the 1988 FIFA Women's Invitation Tournament.
