= Wellington Dias (politician) =

Brazilian politician (born 1962)

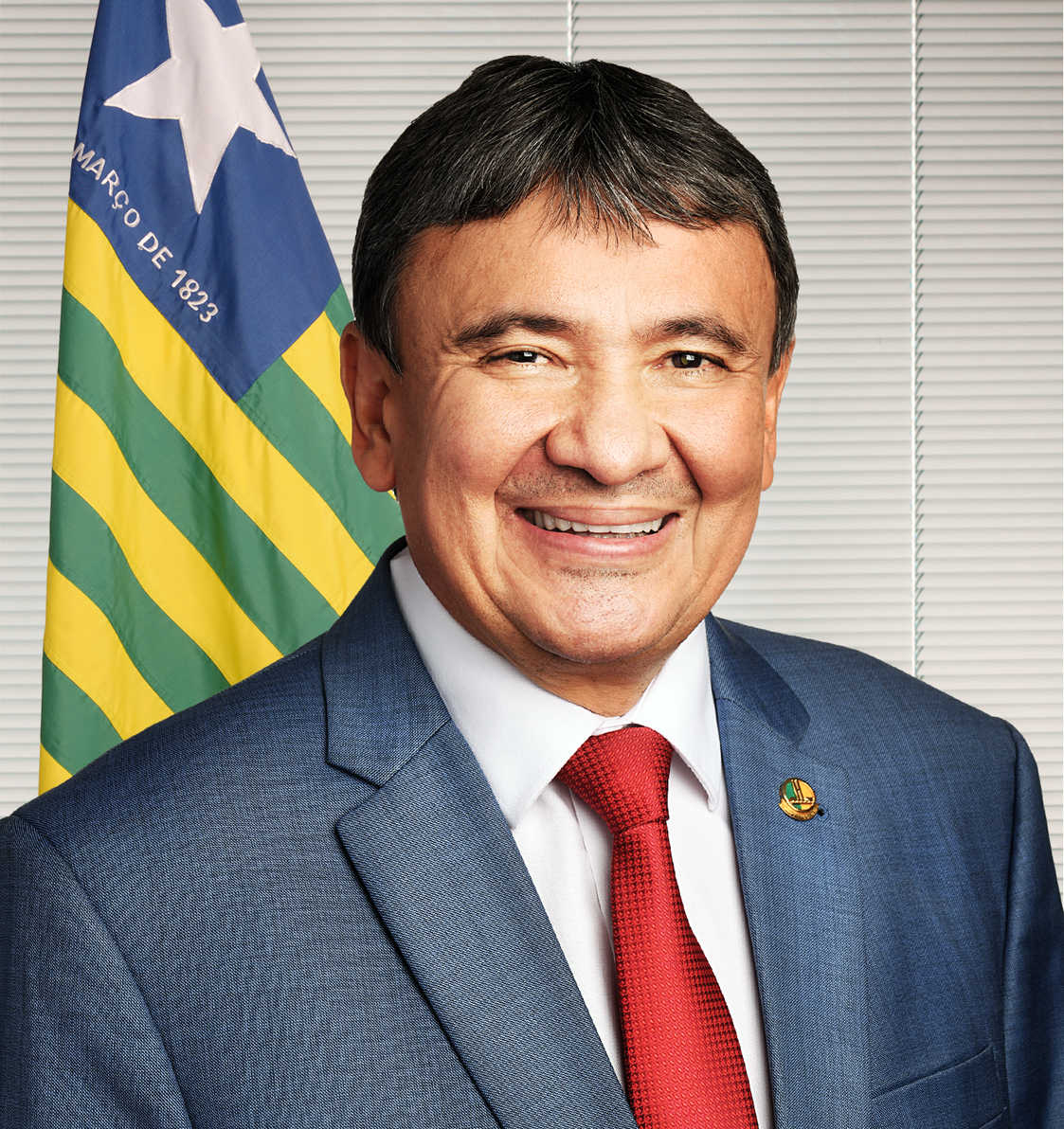

Ministry of Social Development
- Incumbent
- Assumed office 1 January 2023
- President: Luiz Inácio Lula da Silva
- Preceded by: Alberto Beltrame

Governor of Piauí
- In office 1 January 2015 – 31 March 2022
- Vice Governor: Margarete Coelho; Regina Sousa
- Preceded by: Zé Filho
- Succeeded by: Regina Sousa
- In office 1 January 2003 – 1 April 2010
- Vice Governor: Osmar Júnior; Wilson Martins
- Preceded by: Hugo Napoleão
- Succeeded by: Wilson Martins

Senator for Piauí
- In office 1 February 2011 – 1 January 2015
- In office 1 February 2023 – 6 February 2023
- Succeeded by: Jussara Lima

Member of the Chamber of Deputies for Piauí
- In office 1 February 1999 – 29 November 2002

Member of the Legislative Assembly of Piauí
- In office 1 January 1995 – 1 February 1999

Member of the Teresina City Council
- In office 1 January 1993 – 1 February 1995

Personal details
- Born: 5 March 1962 (age 64) Oeiras, Piauí, Brazil
- Party: Workers' Party (1985–present)
- Spouse: Rejane Dias
- Children: 3
- Profession: Banker

José Wellington Barroso de Araújo Dias, known as Wellington Dias, (born 5 March 1962, in Oeiras, Piauí) is a Brazilian politician, Governor of Piauí, and a former federal Senator representing Piauí. He is a member of the Workers' Party.

He is married to Rejane Dias, a member of the Legislative Assembly of Piauí from 2011 to 2015 and the First Lady of Piauí from 2003 to 2010.

== Biography ==
Son of Joaquim Antônio Neto, elected mayor of Paes Landim by ARENA in 1972, and Teresinha de Araújo Dias, elected deputy mayor of the same municipality by the PFL in 1988, Wellington Dias was born in the municipality of Oeiras, in Piauí, but was raised in Paes Lacy in the same state. [2] During his youth, he joined the undergraduate course in Portuguese Literature at the Federal University of Piauí (1982) and specialized in Public Policy and Government at the Federal University of Rio de Janeiro. He started working at the age of 19, working as a broadcaster at Rádio Difusora in Teresina, Piauí. As a bank employee, he worked as a manager at Banco do Nordeste, as a cashier and substitute manager at Banco do Estado do Piauí, in São João do Piauí and, at the age of 22, he passed the competition for Caixa Econômica Federal (CEF) of which is a career employee, holding the position of manager in 1984. Wellington Dias started political activism at a young age, working in the university student movement, getting involved with the Ecclesiastical Base Communities (CEBs) and also in the union movement. In 1985, he joined the Partido dos Trabalhadores (PT) and participated as a member of the Central Única dos Trabalhadores, becoming president of APCEF (Personnel Association of Caixa Econômica Federal) between 1986 and 1989 and president of the Union of Bank employees of the State of Piauí between 1989 and 1992. Also between 1987 and 1988, Dias chaired the deliberative board of Fenae Corretora de Seguros and, between 1988 and 1989, he was secretary of the fiscal council of the same institution. As a writer, he is the author of five literary works and has even received an honorable mention for the "Contest of Tales João Pinheiro", from the Secretariat of Culture of Piauí. In addition, Wellington Dias is married to federal deputy Rejane Dias with whom he has three children: Iasmin, Vinícius and Daniely.

== Political career ==
Affiliated to the Workers’ Party of Brazil (PT) since the age of 23, Wellington Dias began his political career in 1992 when he was elected councilor of Teresina. In 1994, he chose to resign from the municipal mandate to run for a position in the Legislative Assembly of Piauí, managing to be elected state deputy and becoming the first president of the Human Rights Commission in the state legislature. At the same time, he was also regional president of the PT between 1995 and 1997, and even ran for vice-mayor of the municipality Teresina in the Nazareno Fonteles ticket, but was unable to reach the second round. In the 1998 state elections, he was elected federal deputy by the PT and the state's first parliamentarian elected by the party. [2] During his term, he chaired the Financial Supervision and Control Commission (CFFC) and was a member of the Public Security and Combat against Organized Crime Commission (CSPCCO). [2] In the October 2000 elections, he was a candidate for the mayor of Teresina but was defeated in the first round with the reelection of Firmino da Silveira Soares Filho, of the Brazilian Social Democracy Party (PSDB). [2] On the eve of the 2002 elections, Wellington Dias was announced by the PT as a candidate for the Senate, but an articulation commanded by the party's national directory made him a candidate for the State Government. [2] He started the campaign with low rates in the polls, however, as the campaign progressed, his performance improved as his name became an alternative to the state succession, mainly thanks to the support of PMDB leaders, like the PMDB. former governor Mão Santa. [3] Elected in the first round to the post of governor of Piauí by the coalition A Vitória que o Povo Quer, defeated then governor Hugo Napoleão, who was running for reelection. [2] In 2006, Wellington Dias was a candidate for re-election to the State Government and managed to win the election even in the first round against his main opponent and former ally, the then senator Mão Santa. [4] It was during his government that the great tragedy of the Algodões Dam happened in May 2009. [5] Dias resigned on 1 April 2010, with the intention of running for the Senate, being replaced by Vice Wilson Martins. [2] In the 2010 elections, Wellington Dias was elected senator from the state of Piauí alongside Ciro Nogueira do Progressistas (PP) with the sum of 997,513 votes. [3] In 2014, he was elected for his third term as governor of Piauí, being reelected in 2018 for the 4th term as governor of the state with 55.6% of the valid votes (966 thousand), overcoming his main opponent, the doctor Dr. Pessoa of the Solidariedade party who obtained 20.4% of the votes (355 thousand). [6]
