= Valença do Piauí =

Coordinates: 6°24′S 41°45′W

- Municipality
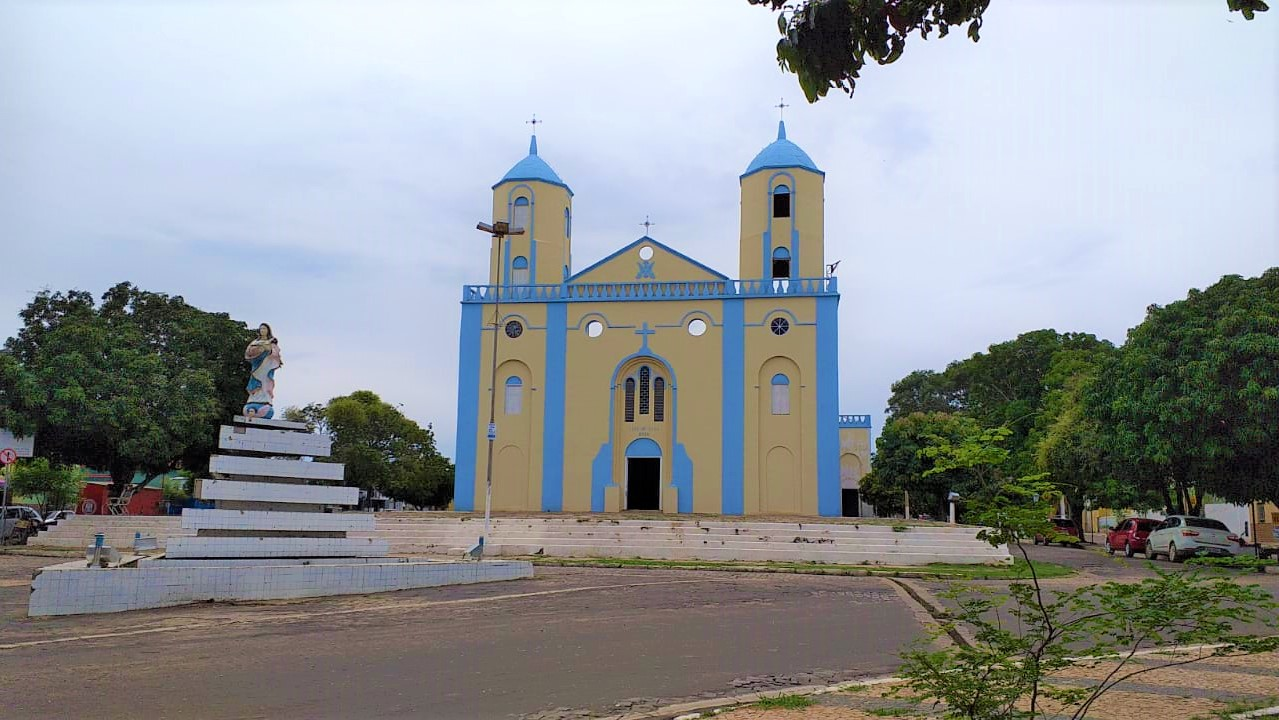

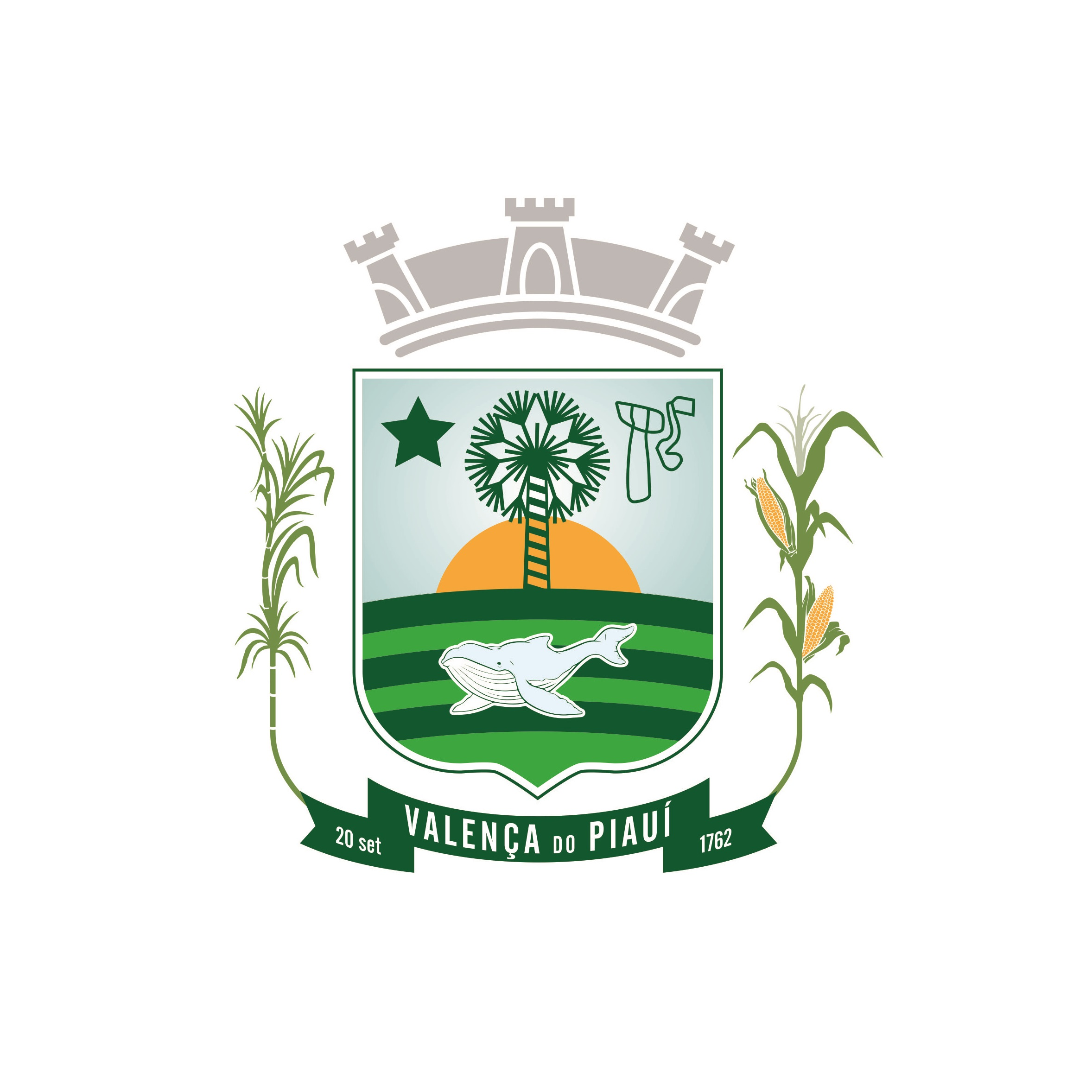
- Coat of arms

- Country: Brazil
- Region: Nordeste
- State: Piauí
- Mesoregion: Centro-Norte Piauiense

Population (2020)
  - Total: 20,929
- Time zone: UTC−3 (BRT)

Valença do Piauí is a municipality in the state of Piauí in the Northeast region of Brazil.

== See also ==
- List of municipalities in Piauí
