= Lucídio Portela =

Brazilian doctor and politician

Governor of Piauí
- In office March 15, 1979 – March 15, 1983
- Preceded by: Djalma Martins Veloso
- Succeeded by: Hugo Napoleão do Rego Neto

Personal details
- Born: Lucídio Portela Nunes; April 8, 1922 Valença do Piauí, Piauí, Brazil
- Died: October 30, 2015 (aged 93) Teresina, Piauí, Brazil
- Spouse: Myriam Nogueira Portela Nunes
- Education: Federal University of Rio de Janeiro
- Occupation: Politician

Lucídio Portela Nunes (8 April 1922 – 30 October 2015) was a Brazilian doctor and politician. He served as the governor of Piauí from 1979 to 1983.

== Biography ==
Born in Valença do Piauí in 1922, Nunes was the Governor of Piauí from 1979 to 1983. He was the elder brother of the late Petrônio Portela Nunes, an advocate for political openness during the governments of Ernesto Geisel and João Figueiredo. He died on 30 October 2015 in Teresina.
