= Hugo Napoleão =

Coordinates: 5.98889°S 42.5558°W

- Municipality
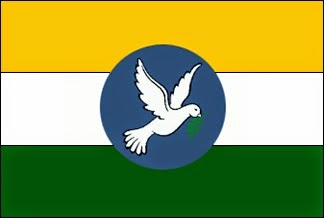
- Flag

- Country: Brazil
- Region: Nordeste
- State: Piauí
- Mesoregion: Centro-Norte Piauiense

Population (2020)
  - Total: 3,879
- Time zone: UTC−3 (BRT)

Hugo Napoleão is a municipality in the state of Piauí in the Northeast region of Brazil.

== See also ==
- List of municipalities in Piauí
