= Federal University of Piauí =

University in Teresina, Brazil

- Universidade Federal do Piauí
- Other name: UFPI
- Type: Public university system, Federal
- Established: March 1, 1971
- Endowment: R$ 470.208.590,20 (2013)
- Rector: Nadir do Nascimento Nogueira
- Students: 27,353
- Location: Teresina, Piauí, Brazil
- Campus: 5 campuses: (Teresina, Bom Jesus, Floriano, Parnaíba, and Picos)
- Website: https://ufpi.br/

The Federal University of Piauí (Portuguese: Universidade Federal do Piauí, UFPI) is a federal university in Teresina, Piauí. It is the major university in the state of Piauí and one of the main research centers in Brazil's Northeast Region. The university has research partnerships with several universities across the globe and has hosted research events during the 2024 G20 meeting, held in Teresina.

== Notable alumni ==
- Marcelo Castro, former Health Minister of Brazil

== See also ==
- Brazil University Rankings
- List of federal universities of Brazil
- Universities and Higher Education in Brazil
