= Legislative Assembly of Piauí =

Legislative Assembly of Piauí Assembleia Legislativa do Piauí

Type
- Type: Unicameral
- Seats: 30 deputies

Meeting place
- Teresina, Piauí, Brazil

Website
- www.alepi.pi.gov.br/index.php

The Legislative Assembly of Piauí (Portuguese: Assembleia Legislativa do Piauí) is the unicameral legislature of the Brazilian state of Piauí. The assembly, which is seated in the state capital of Teresina, is composed of has 30 state deputies elected by proportional representation.
