= 2018 Espírito Santo general election =

2018 Espírito Santo state election
- 7 October 2018
- Turnout: 80.74%
- Gubernatorial election
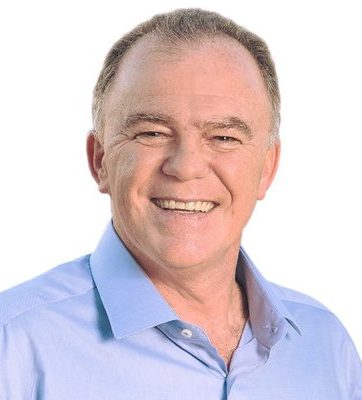

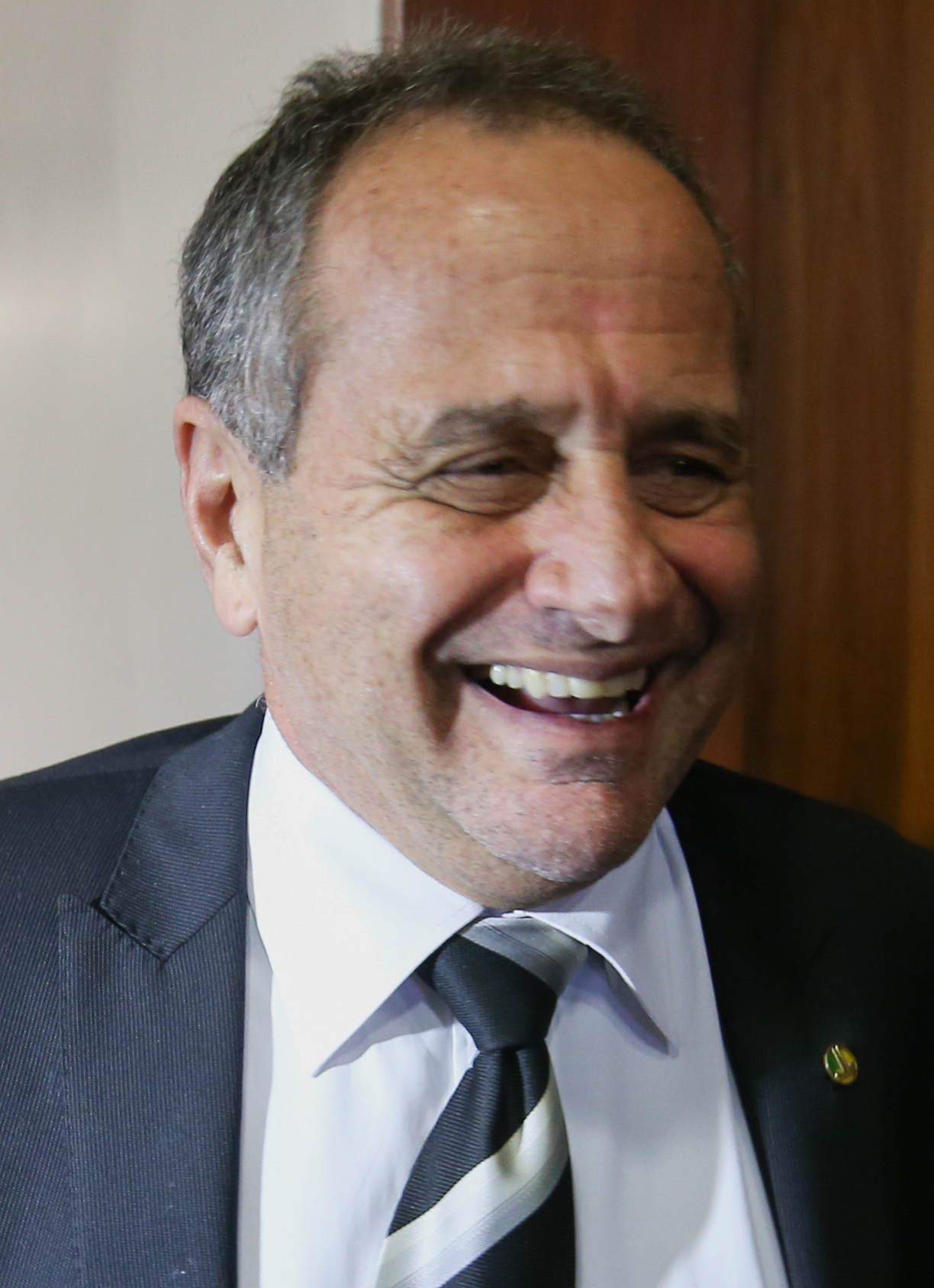
Candidate	Renato Casagrande	Carlos Manato
Party	PSB	PSL
Running mate	Jacqueline Moraes	Rogério Zamperlini
Popular vote	1,072,224	525,973
Percentage	55.50%	27.22%
- Candidate with the most votes per municipality in the 1st round (78): Renato Casagrande (77 municipalities); Carlos Manato (1 municipality)
Governor before election
Paulo Hartung
MDB
Elected Governor
Renato Casagrande
PSB
- Senatorial election
- 7 October 2018
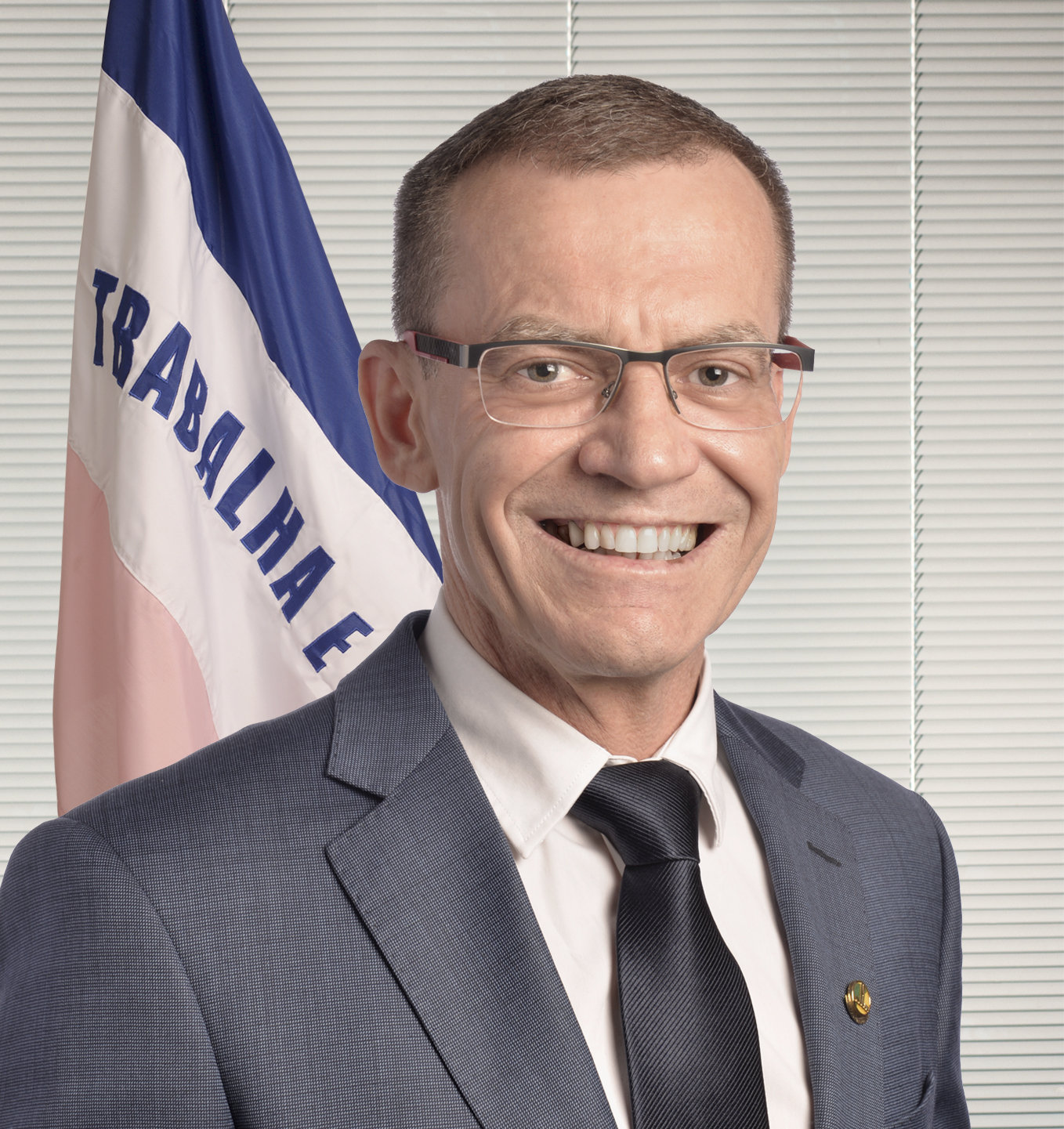

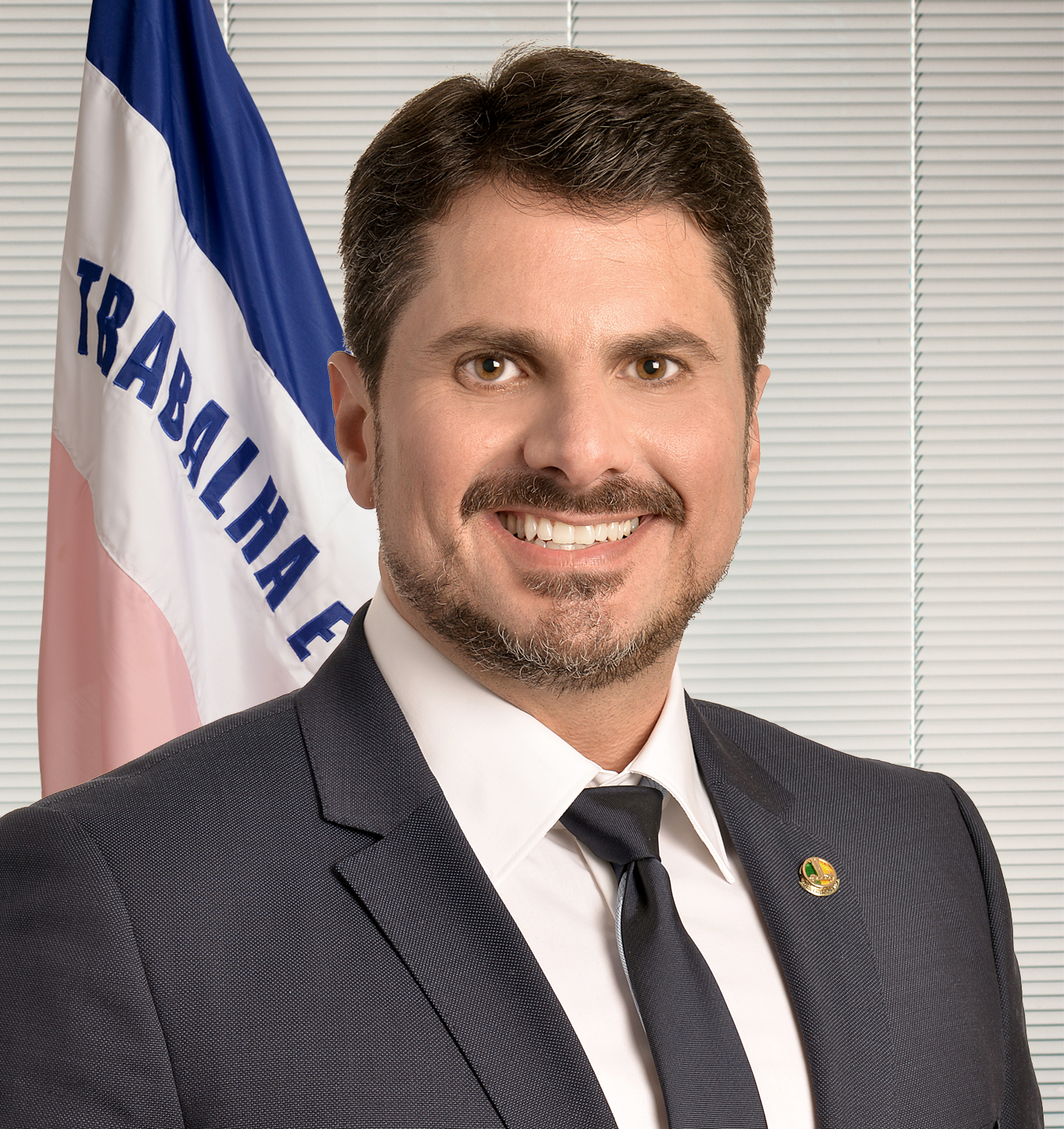

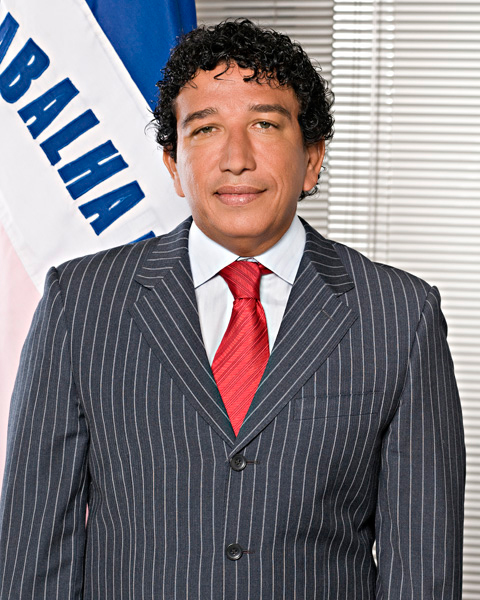
Candidate	Fabiano Contarato	Marcos do Val	Magno Malta
Party	REDE	PPS	PR
Alliance	A New Way for Espírito Santo	Espírito Santo More Equal	In Defense of Life and Family
Popular vote	1,117,036	863,359	611,284
Percentage	31.15%	24.08%	17.05%
Senator before election
Ricardo Ferraço and Magno Malta
PSDB and PR
Elected Senator
Fabiano Contarato and Marcos do Val
REDE and PPS

The Espírito Santo gubernatorial election occurred in 7 October 2018, and elected the Governor and Vice Governor of Espírito Santo and 28 State Deputies.

The previous gubernatorial election in the state was held in October 2014, in which Paulo Hartung of the Brazilian Democratic Movement was elected in the first round with 53.44% of the votes, against 39.34% of Renato Casagrande. Hartung was eligible for a second consecutive term, but decided not to run for a re-election.

Casagrande was elected governor with 55.50% of the valid votes in the first round, against congressman Carlos Manato (PSL), with 27.22% of the valid votes. For the Senate election, incumbents Ricardo Ferraço (PSDB) and Magno Malta (PR) were defeated by civil police chief Fabiano Contarato (REDE) and speaker and instructor Marcos do Val (PPS).

== Candidates ==
=== Governor ===
Party	Candidate	Most relevant political office or occupation	Party	Running mate	Coalition	Electoral number
Workers' Party (PT)	Jackeline Rocha	Municipal Secretary of Press of Colatina	Workers' Party (PT)	Cléber Lanes	—N/a	13
Brazilian Labour Party (PTB)	Aridelmo Teixeira	Professor and entrepreneur	Brazilian Labour Party (PTB)	Jéssica Polese	Innovation with Competence: Brazilian Labour Party (PTB); Brazilian Woman's Party (PMB)	14
Social Liberal Party (PSL)	Carlos Manato	Member of the Chamber of Deputies (2003–2019)	Social Liberal Party (PSL)	Rogério Zamperlini	In Defense of Life and Family: Social Liberal Party (PSL); Party of the Republic (PR); Brazilian Republican Party (PRB)	17
Podemos (PODE)	Rose de Freitas	Senator for Espírito Santo (2015–2023)	Podemos (PODE)	Thanguy Frico	A New Way for Espírito Santo: Podemos (PODE); Brazilian Labour Renewal Party (PRTB); Sustainability Network (REDE); Brazilian Democratic Movement (MDB); Patriota; Party of National Mobilization (PMN)	19
Brazilian Socialist Party (PSB)	Renato Casagrande	Governor of Espírito Santo (2011–2015)	Brazilian Socialist Party (PSB)	Jacqueline Moraes	Espírito Santo More Equal: Brazilian Socialist Party (PSB); Popular Socialist Party (PPS); Brazilian Social Democracy Party (PSDB); Humanist Party of Solidarity (PHS); Republican Party of the Social Order (PROS); Green Party (PV); Social Christian Party (PSC); Avante; Christian Labour Party (PTC); Progressistas (PP); Communist Party of Brazil (PCdoB); Democrats (DEM); Democratic Labour Party (PDT); Free Fatherland Party (PPL); Christian Democracy (DC); Solidariedade; Progressive Republican Party (PRP); Social Democratic Party (PSD)	40
Socialism and Liberty Party (PSOL)		Lawyer and human rights activist	Socialism and Liberty Party (PSOL)	Adriana Faroni	Socialist Left-Wing Front: Socialism and Liberty Party (PSOL); Brazilian Communist Party (PCB)	50

=== Senator ===
Party	Candidate	Most relevant political office or occupation	Party	Candidates for Alternate Senators	Coalition	Electoral number
Workers' Party (PT)	Célia Tavares	University professor	Workers' Party (PT)	1st alternate senator: Perly Cipriano	—N/a	131
Workers' Party (PT)	Célia Tavares	University professor	Workers' Party (PT)	2nd alternate senator: Maria Luiza Casotti	—N/a	131
Brazilian Labour Party (PTB)	Helder Carnielli	Agricultural engineer	Brazilian Labour Party (PTB)	1st alternate senator: Roberto Martins	Innovation with Competence: Brazilian Labour Party (PTB); Brazilian Woman's Party (PMB)	144
Brazilian Labour Party (PTB)	Helder Carnielli	Agricultural engineer	Brazilian Labour Party (PTB)	2nd alternate senator: Nilo Franco	Innovation with Competence: Brazilian Labour Party (PTB); Brazilian Woman's Party (PMB)	144
Brazilian Woman's Party (PMB)	Rogério Bernardo	Lawyer	Brazilian Woman's Party (PMB)	1st alternate senator: Cintia Teixeira	Innovation with Competence: Brazilian Labour Party (PTB); Brazilian Woman's Party (PMB)	355
Brazilian Woman's Party (PMB)	Rogério Bernardo	Lawyer	Brazilian Woman's Party (PMB)	2nd alternate senator: Vagner Tonetto	Innovation with Competence: Brazilian Labour Party (PTB); Brazilian Woman's Party (PMB)	355
Social Liberal Party (PSL)	Sérgio de Assis	Military police lieutenant	Social Liberal Party (PSL)	1st alternate senator: Robson Fonseca	In Defense of Life and Family: Social Liberal Party (PSL); Party of the Republic (PR); Brazilian Republican Party (PRB)	177
Social Liberal Party (PSL)	Sérgio de Assis	Military police lieutenant	Social Liberal Party (PSL)	2nd alternate senator: Flávio Mello Sant'ana	In Defense of Life and Family: Social Liberal Party (PSL); Party of the Republic (PR); Brazilian Republican Party (PRB)	177
Party of the Republic (PR)	Magno Malta	Senator for Espírito Santo (2003–2019)	Party of the Republic (PR)	1st alternate senator: Carlos Salvador	In Defense of Life and Family: Social Liberal Party (PSL); Party of the Republic (PR); Brazilian Republican Party (PRB)	222
Party of the Republic (PR)	Magno Malta	Senator for Espírito Santo (2003–2019)	Party of the Republic (PR)	2nd alternate senator: Moabe Souza	In Defense of Life and Family: Social Liberal Party (PSL); Party of the Republic (PR); Brazilian Republican Party (PRB)	222
Sustainability Network (REDE)	Fabiano Contarato	Civil police chief	Brazilian Democratic Movement (MDB)	1st alternate senator: Ana Paula Tongo	A New Way for Espírito Santo: Podemos (PODE); Brazilian Labour Renewal Party (PRTB); Sustainability Network (REDE); Brazilian Democratic Movement (MDB); Patriota; Party of National Mobilization (PMN)	181
Sustainability Network (REDE)	Fabiano Contarato	Civil police chief	Sustainability Network (REDE)	2nd alternate senator: Bento Porto	A New Way for Espírito Santo: Podemos (PODE); Brazilian Labour Renewal Party (PRTB); Sustainability Network (REDE); Brazilian Democratic Movement (MDB); Patriota; Party of National Mobilization (PMN)	181
Brazilian Communist Party (PCB)	Mauro Ribeiro	Public servant	Brazilian Communist Party (PCB)	1st alternate senator: Manoel Tavares	Socialist Left-Wing Front: Socialism and Liberty Party (PSOL); Brazilian Communist Party (PCB)	211
Brazilian Communist Party (PCB)	Mauro Ribeiro	Public servant	Brazilian Communist Party (PCB)	2nd alternate senator: Dinho da Silva	Socialist Left-Wing Front: Socialism and Liberty Party (PSOL); Brazilian Communist Party (PCB)	211
Socialism and Liberty Party (PSOL)	Liu Katrine	High school teacher	Socialism and Liberty Party (PSOL)	1st alternate senator: Tony Cabano	Socialist Left-Wing Front: Socialism and Liberty Party (PSOL); Brazilian Communist Party (PCB)	500
Socialism and Liberty Party (PSOL)	Liu Katrine	High school teacher	Socialism and Liberty Party (PSOL)	2nd alternate senator: Wilson Junior	Socialist Left-Wing Front: Socialism and Liberty Party (PSOL); Brazilian Communist Party (PCB)	500
Popular Socialist Party (PPS)	Marcos do Val	Speaker and gun instructor	Popular Socialist Party (PPS)	1st alternate senator: Rosana Foerst	Espírito Santo More Equal: Brazilian Socialist Party (PSB); Popular Socialist Party (PPS); Brazilian Social Democracy Party (PSDB); Humanist Party of Solidarity (PHS); Republican Party of the Social Order (PROS); Green Party (PV); Social Christian Party (PSC); Avante; Christian Labour Party (PTC); Progressistas (PP); Communist Party of Brazil (PCdoB); Democrats (DEM); Democratic Labour Party (PDT); Free Fatherland Party (PPL); Christian Democracy (DC); Solidariedade; Progressive Republican Party (PRP); Social Democratic Party (PSD)	''234
Popular Socialist Party (PPS)	Marcos do Val	Speaker and gun instructor	Popular Socialist Party (PPS)	2nd alternate senator: Ronaldo Libardi		''234
Brazilian Social Democracy Party (PSDB)	Ricardo Ferraço	Senator for Espírito Santo (2011–2019)	Brazilian Social Democracy Party (PSDB)	1st alternate senator: Eutemar Venturim		456
Brazilian Social Democracy Party (PSDB)	Ricardo Ferraço	Senator for Espírito Santo (2011–2019)	Humanist Party of Solidarity (PHS)	2nd alternate senator: Jurandy Loureiro		456
New Party (NOVO)	Ulisses Pincelli	Businessman	New Party (NOVO)	1st alternate senator: Giuliano Sandri	—N/a	300
New Party (NOVO)	Ulisses Pincelli	Businessman	New Party (NOVO)	2nd alternate senator: Fred Esteves	—N/a	300

== Opinion polls ==
=== Governor ===
Pollster/client(s)	Date(s) conducted	Sample size	Casagrande PSB	Manato PSL	Rocha PT	Freitas PODE	Teixeira PTB	Moreira PSOL	Abst. Undec.	Lead
2018 election	7 October	–	55.50%	27.22%	7.38%	5.47%	3.25%	1.18%	13.09%	28.28%
Ibope	4–5 October	812	58%	13%	6%	10%	3%	2%	9%	45%
Ibope	15–17 August	812	54%	4%	1%	13%	1%	1%	26%	41%

== Results ==
=== Governor ===
Candidate	Running mate	Party	Votes	%
Renato Casagrande	Jacqueline Moraes	PSB	1,072,224	55.49
Carlos Manato	Rogério Zamperlini	PSL	525,973	27.22
Jackeline Rocha	Cléber Lanes	PT	142,654	7.38
Rose de Freitas	Thanguy Frico	PODE	105,754	5.47
Aridelmo Teixeira	Jéssica Polese	PTB	62,821	3.25
André Moreira	Adriana Faroni	PSOL	22,875	1.18
Total			1,932,301	100.00
Valid votes			1,932,301	86.92
Invalid votes			175,988	7.92
Blank votes			114,918	5.17
Total votes			2,223,207	100.00
Registered voters/turnout			2,753,585	80.74
PSB gain from MDB				

=== Senator ===
Candidate	Party	Votes	%
Fabiano Contarato	REDE	1,117,036	31.15
Marcos do Val	PPS	863,359	24.08
Magno Malta (incumbent)	PR	611,284	17.05
Ricardo Ferraço (incumbent)	PSDB	480,122	13.39
Sérgio de Assis	PSL	247,165	6.89
Célia Tavares	PT	164,845	4.60
Ulisses Pincelli	NOVO	37,119	1.04
Liu Katrine	PSOL	24,496	0.68
Helder Carnielli	PTB	22,844	0.64
Rogério Bernardo	PTB	9,531	0.27
Mauro Ribeiro	PCB	8,287	0.23
Total		3,586,088	100.00
Valid votes		3,586,088	80.65
Invalid votes		513,931	11.56
Blank votes		346,395	7.79
Total votes		4,446,414	100.00
Registered voters/turnout		5,507,170	80.74
REDE gain from PR			
PPS gain from PSDB			

=== Chamber of Deputies ===
Party	Votes	%	Seats	+/–
Brazilian Socialist Party	254,203	13.15	2	▲1
Brazilian Republican Party	238,966	12.36	1	▲1
Social Liberal Party	166,811	8.63	1	▲1
Progressistas	154,426	7.99	1	Steady
Workers' Party	140,398	7.26	1	▼1
Popular Socialist Party	116,265	6.01	1	▲1
Party of the Republic	100,246	5.19	1	▲1
Democratic Labour Party	90,092	4.66	1	Steady
Brazilian Democratic Movement	66,015	3.42	0	▼1
Democrats	61,165	3.16	1	▲1
Brazilian Labour Party	57,964	3.00	0	Steady
Social Democratic Party	56,459	2.92	0	Steady
Sustainability Network	54,507	2.82	0	New
Solidariedade	45,859	2.37	0	▼1
Brazilian Social Democracy Party	45,204	2.34	0	▼1
Communist Party of Brazil	41,124	2.13	0	Steady
New Party	33,808	1.75	0	New
Avante	31,343	1.62	0	Steady
Republican Party of the Social Order	30,047	1.55	0	▼1
Social Christian Party	28,477	1.47	0	Steady
Humanist Party of Solidarity	27,279	1.41	0	Steady
Green Party	23,244	1.20	0	▼1
Socialism and Liberty Party	14,776	0.76	0	Steady
Podemos	13,069	0.68	0	Steady
Progressive Republican Party	11,217	0.58	0	Steady
Free Fatherland Party	7,817	0.40	0	Steady
Christian Democracy	7,597	0.39	0	Steady
Patriota	3,214	0.17	0	Steady
Brazilian Labour Renewal Party	3,176	0.16	0	Steady
Brazilian Woman's Party	2,936	0.15	0	New
Christian Labour Party	2,863	0.15	0	Steady
Party of National Mobilization	1,866	0.10	0	Steady
Brazilian Communist Party	585	0.03	0	Steady
Total	1,933,018	100.00	10	–
Valid votes	1,933,018	86.95		
Invalid votes	145,823	6.56		
Blank votes	144,366	6.49		
Total votes	2,223,207	100.00		
Registered voters/turnout	2,753,585	80.74		

=== Legislative Assembly ===
Party	Votes	%	Seats	+/–
Brazilian Socialist Party	162,560	8.34	2	Steady
Social Liberal Party	160,923	8.25	4	▲4
Brazilian Democratic Movement	142,945	7.33	2	▼2
Brazilian Republican Party	142,273	7.30	2	▲2
Brazilian Social Democracy Party	113,759	5.84	3	▲1
Progressistas	105,787	5.43	1	▼1
Progressive Republican Party	95,533	4.90	2	▼1
Workers' Party	84,240	4.32	1	▼2
Popular Socialist Party	73,311	3.76	1	▼1
Democratic Labour Party	68,443	3.51	1	▼1
Brazilian Labour Party	67,839	3.48	1	▲1
Green Party	64,364	3.30	2	▲1
Sustainability Network	63,731	3.27	1	New
Social Christian Party	63,105	3.24	0	Steady
Social Democratic Party	61,432	3.15	1	Steady
Communist Party of Brazil	51,176	2.62	0	Steady
Solidariedade	50,666	2.60	0	▼1
Podemos	43,510	2.23	0	Steady
Democrats	43,203	2.22	1	▼1
Avante	36,813	1.89	1	▲1
Christian Democracy	34,302	1.76	1	▲1
Party of National Mobilization	33,298	1.71	1	Steady
Republican Party of the Social Order	31,716	1.63	1	▲1
Christian Labour Party	29,785	1.53	0	▼1
Party of the Republic	24,672	1.27	0	▼1
Patriota	23,975	1.23	1	Steady
Socialism and Liberty Party	23,048	1.18	0	Steady
Humanist Party of Solidarity	21,735	1.11	0	Steady
Brazilian Woman's Party	14,145	0.73	0	New
Brazilian Labour Renewal Party	12,017	0.62	0	▼1
Free Fatherland Party	4,649	0.24	0	Steady
Brazilian Communist Party	612	0.03	0	Steady
Total	1,949,567	100.00	30	–
Valid votes	1,949,567	87.69		
Invalid votes	143,676	6.46		
Blank votes	129,964	5.85		
Total votes	2,223,207	100.00		
Registered voters/turnout	2,753,585	80.74		
