= 2022 Espírito Santo general election =

2022 Espírito Santo state election
- 2 October 2022 (first round); 30 October 2022 (second round)
- Opinion polls
- Turnout: 79.23% (first round); 79.46% (second round)
- Gubernatorial election
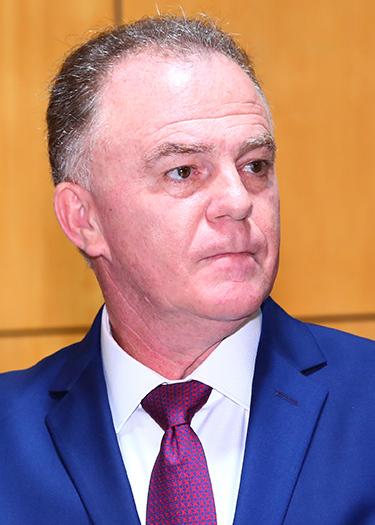

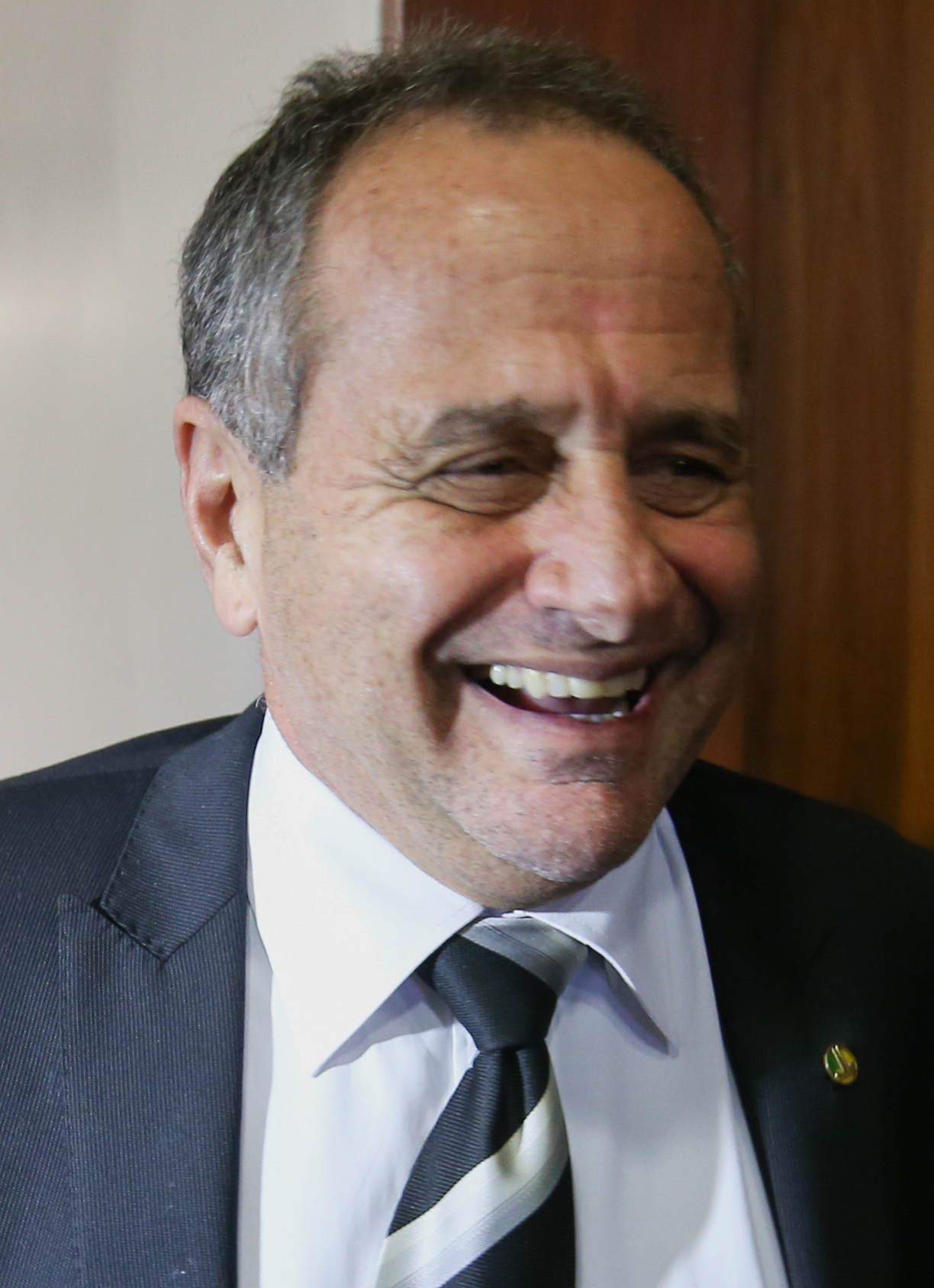
Candidate	Renato Casagrande	Carlos Manato
Party	PSB	PL
Alliance	Together for a Stronger Espírito Santo	Espírito Santo of All the Capixabas
Running mate	Ricardo Ferraço	Bruno Lourenço
Popular vote	1,171,288	1,006,021
Percentage	53.80%	46.20%
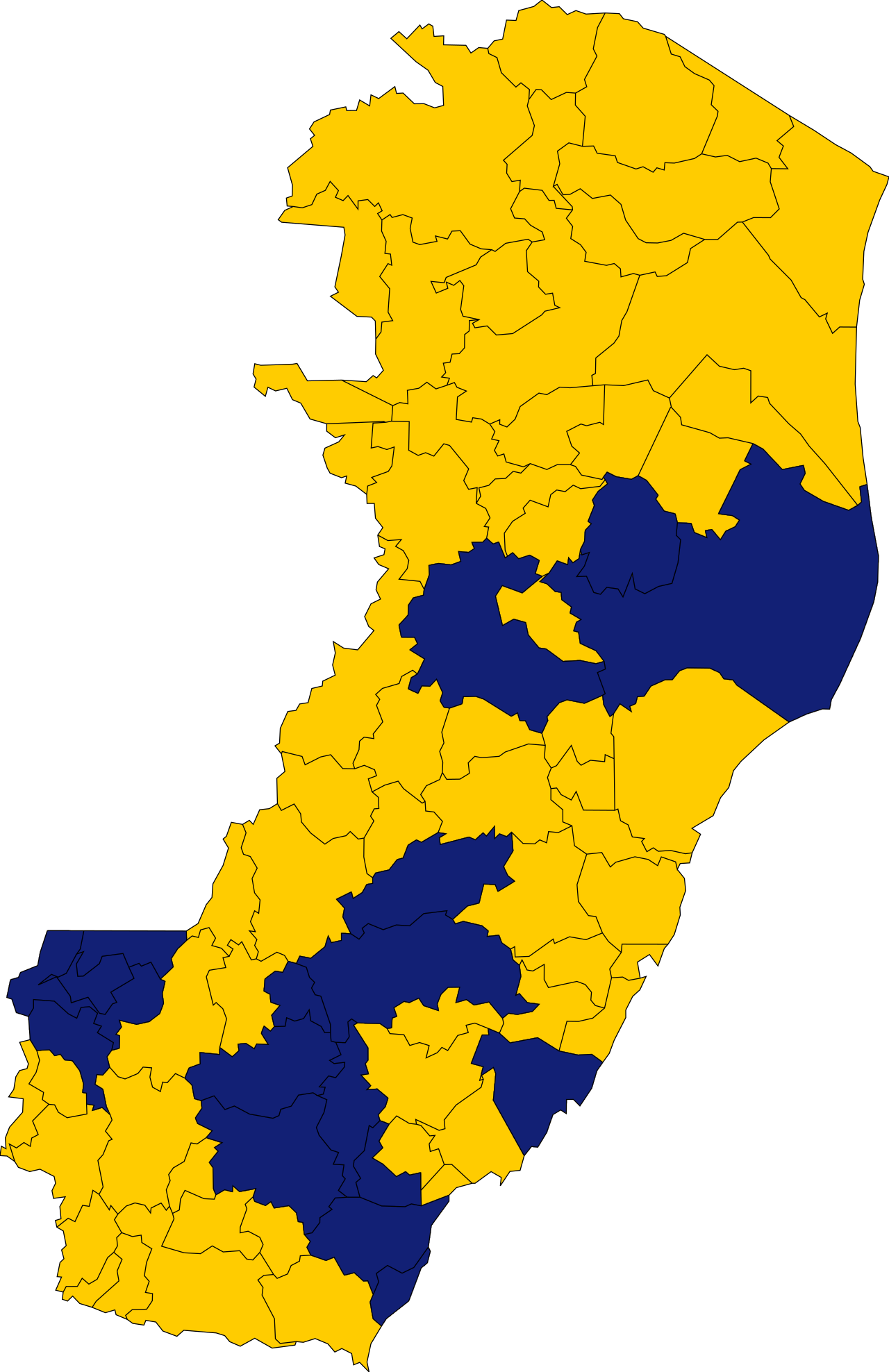
- Candidate with the most votes per municipality in the 2nd round (78): Renato Casagrande (61 municipalities); Carlos Manato (17 municipalities)
Governor before election
Renato Casagrande
PSB
Elected Governor
Renato Casagrande
PSB
- Senatorial election
- 2 October 2022 (one-only round)
- Opinion polls
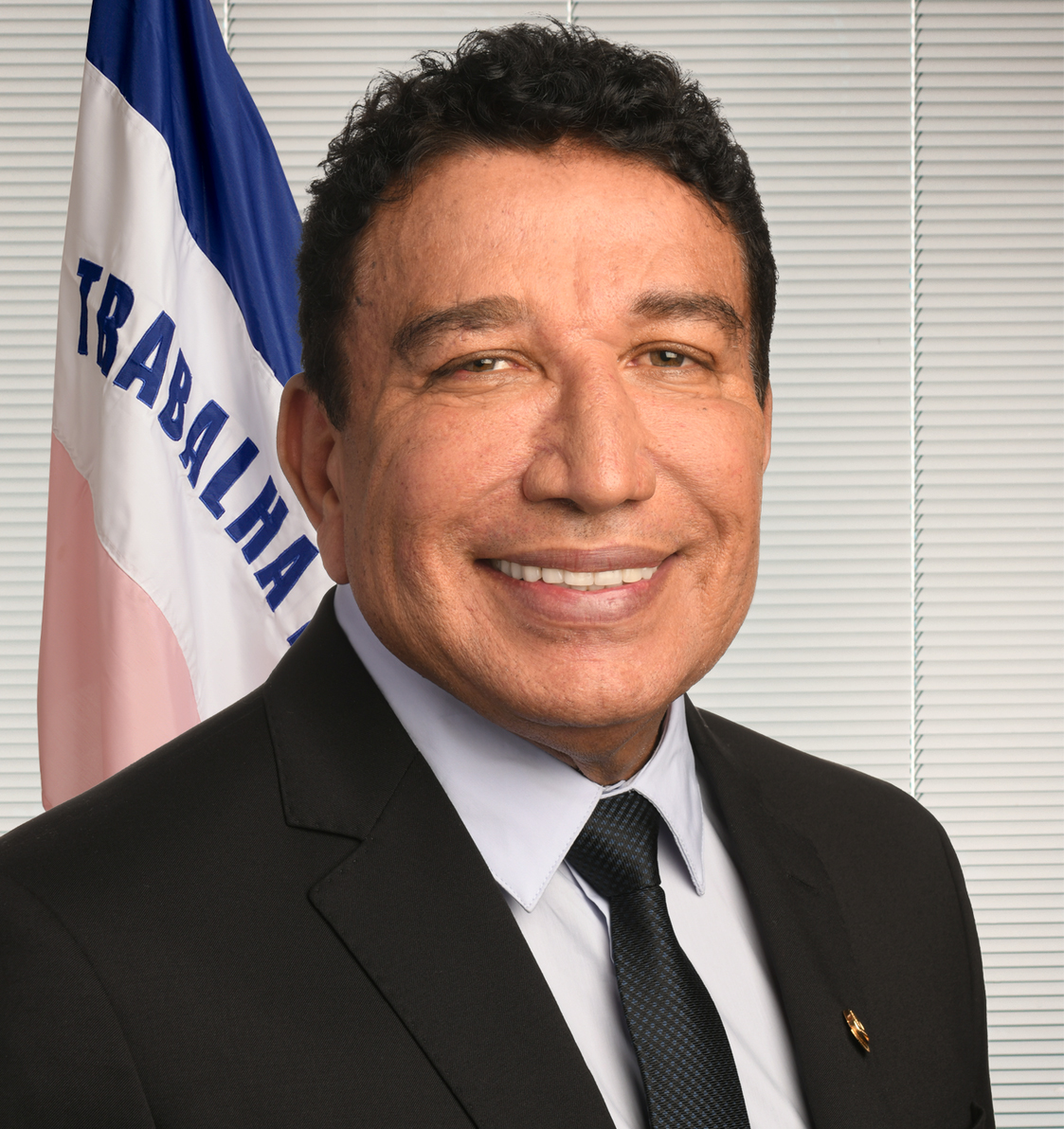

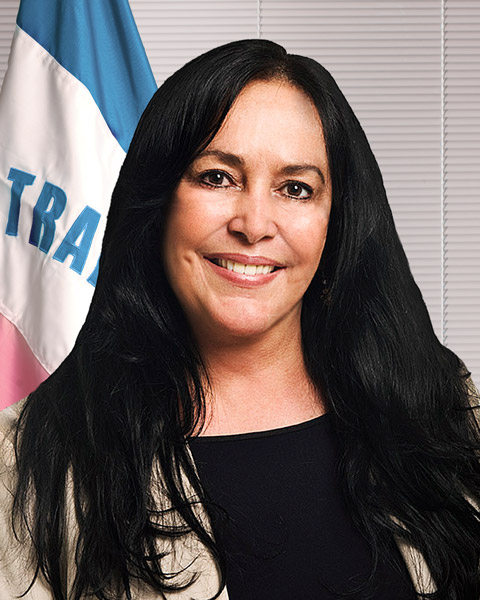
Candidate	Magno Malta	Rose de Freitas
Party	PL	MDB
Alliance	Espírito Santo of All the Capixabas	Together for a Stronger Espírito Santo
Popular vote	821,189	747,104
Percentage	41.95%	38.17%
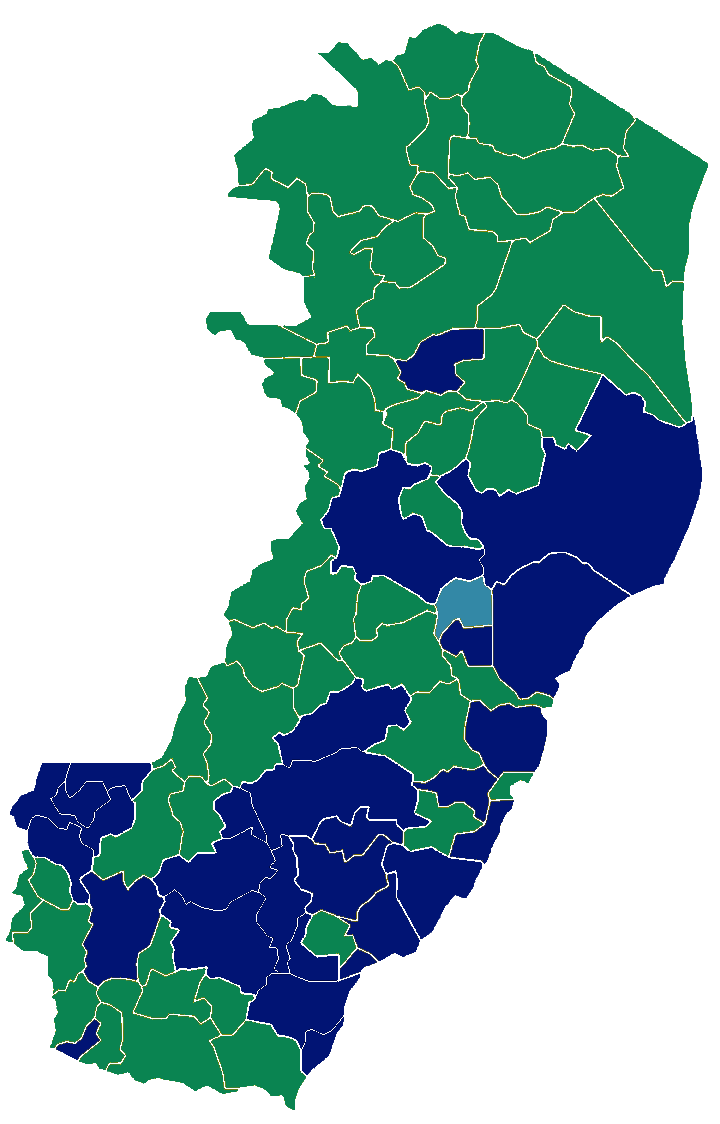
- Candidate with the most votes per municipality (78): Rose de Freitas (49 municipalities); Márcio França (28 municipalities); Erick Musso (1 municipality)
Senator before election
Rose de Freitas
MDB
Elected Senator
Magno Malta
PL

The 2022 Espírito Santo gubernatorial election occurred on 2 October 2022 and elected the Governor and Vice Governor of the state and members for the 30 seats of the Legislative Assembly.

After the previous election, incumbent Governor Renato Casagrande was eligible for a second consecutive term, making a rematch with former member of the Chamber of Deputies, Carlos Manato (PL). Casagrande was re-elected with 53.80% of the valid votes in the second round against Manato. From this time on, the terms of the Governor and Vice Governor began on 1 January 2023 and will expire on 6 January 2027, after the approval of a constitutional amendment in 2021.

For the seat available for the Federal Senate, incumbent Senator Rose de Freitas (MDB) lost her seat to former Senator Magno Malta (PL).

== Candidates ==
=== Governor ===
==== Candidates in runoff ====
Party	Candidate	Most relevant political office or occupation	Party	Running mate	Coalition	Electoral number
Liberal Party (PL)	Carlos Manato	Member of the Chamber of Deputies (2003–2019	Brazilian Labour Party (PTB)	Bruno Lourenço	Espírito Santos of All the Capixabas: Liberal Party (PL); Brazilian Labour Party (PTB)	22
Brazilian Socialist Party (PSB)	Renato Casagrande	Governor of Espírito Santo (since 2019)	Brazilian Social Democracy Party (PSDB)	Ricardo Ferraço	Together for a Stronger Espírito Santo: Brazilian Socialist Party (PSB); Always Forward; Brazilian Social Democracy Party (PSDB); Cidadania; Brazilian Democratic Movement (MDB); Brazil of Hope; Workers' Party (PT); Communist Party of Brazil (PCdoB); Green Party (PV); Progressistas (PP); Democratic Labour Party (PDT); Podemos (PODE)	40

==== Candidates failing to make runoff ====
Party	Candidate	Most relevant political office or occupation	Party	Running mate	Coalition	Electoral number
United Socialist Workers' Party (PSTU)	Vinicius Souza	Military Police captain	United Socialist Workers' Party (PSTU)	Soraia Chiabai	—N/a	16
Sustainability Network (REDE)	Audifax Barcelos	Mayor of Serra, Espírito Santo (2013–2021)	Solidariedade	Carla Andressa	Commitment with Life: PSOL REDE Federation; Socialism and Liberty Party (PSOL); Sustainability Network (REDE); Solidariedade; Avante; Republican Party of the Social Order (PROS)	18
Brazilian Labour Renewal Party (PRTB)	Claudio Paiva	Administrator and business advisor	Brazilian Labour Renewal Party (PRTB)	Mauro Aurélio	—N/a	28
New Party (NOVO)	Aridelmo Teixeira	Secretary of Finance of Vitória (2021–2022)	New Party (NOVO)	Camila Domingues	—N/a	30
Social Democratic Party (PSD)	Guerino Zanon	Mayor of Linhares (2017–2022)	Social Democratic Party (PSD)	Marcus Magalhães	Espírito Santo Deserves More: Social Democratic Party (PSD); Christian Democracy (DC); Brazilian Woman's Party (PMB)	55

=== Senator ===
Party	Candidate	Most relevant political office or occupation	Party	Candidates for Alternate Senators	Coalition	Electoral number
Republicans	Erick Musso	Member of the Legislative Assembly of Espírito Santo (2015–2023)	Republicans	1st alternate senator: Edimar Hermogenes	It's the Time of the People: Republicanos; Brazil Union (UNIÃO); Social Christian Party (PSC); Patriota	100
Republicans	Erick Musso	Member of the Legislative Assembly of Espírito Santo (2015–2023)	Republicans	2nd alternate senator: Bruna Rafaella	It's the Time of the People: Republicanos; Brazil Union (UNIÃO); Social Christian Party (PSC); Patriota	100
Brazilian Democratic Movement (MDB)	Rose de Freitas	Senator for Espírito Santo (2015–2023)	Brazilian Democratic Movement (MDB)	1st alternate senator: Solange Lube	Together for a Stronger Espírito Santo: Brazilian Socialist Party (PSB); Always Forward; Brazilian Social Democracy Party (PSDB); Cidadania; Brazilian Democratic Movement (MDB); Brazil of Hope; Workers' Party (PT); Communist Party of Brazil (PCdoB); Green Party (PV); Progressistas (PP); Democratic Labour Party (PDT); Podemos (PODE)	156
Brazilian Democratic Movement (MDB)	Rose de Freitas	Senator for Espírito Santo (2015–2023)	Democratic Labour Party (PDT)	2nd alternate senator: Vera Costa	Together for a Stronger Espírito Santo: Brazilian Socialist Party (PSB); Always Forward; Brazilian Social Democracy Party (PSDB); Cidadania; Brazilian Democratic Movement (MDB); Brazil of Hope; Workers' Party (PT); Communist Party of Brazil (PCdoB); Green Party (PV); Progressistas (PP); Democratic Labour Party (PDT); Podemos (PODE)	156
United Socialist Workers' Party (PSTU)	Filipe Skiter	Federal public servant	United Socialist Workers' Party (PSTU)	1st alternate senator: Átila Ibilê	—N/a	161
United Socialist Workers' Party (PSTU)	Filipe Skiter	Federal public servant	United Socialist Workers' Party (PSTU)	2nd alternate senator: Cosme Fermino	—N/a	161
Liberal Party (PL)	Magno Malta	Senator for Espírito Santo (2003–2019)	Liberal Party (PL)	1st alternate senator: Abraão Veloso	Espírito Santos of All the Capixabas: Liberal Party (PL); Brazilian Labour Party (PTB)	222
Liberal Party (PL)	Magno Malta	Senator for Espírito Santo (2003–2019)	Liberal Party (PL)	2nd alternate senator: Emerson Santana	Espírito Santos of All the Capixabas: Liberal Party (PL); Brazilian Labour Party (PTB)	222
Christian Democracy (DC)	Julio Cesar Lugato	Retired military	Christian Democracy (DC)	1st alternate senator: Raimunda Carla da Silva	—N/a	277
Christian Democracy (DC)	Julio Cesar Lugato	Retired military	Christian Democracy (DC)	2nd alternate senator: Fernando Meier	—N/a	277
Brazilian Labour Renewal Party (PRTB)	Antônio Bungenstab	Economist	Brazilian Labour Renewal Party (PRTB)	1st alternate senator: Maria do Socorro Nogueira	—N/a	288
Brazilian Labour Renewal Party (PRTB)	Antônio Bungenstab	Economist	Brazilian Labour Renewal Party (PRTB)	2nd alternate senator: Ceumar Sepulcri	—N/a	288
Agir	Idalécio Carone	Entrepreneur	Agir	1st alternate senator: Cezar Assreuy	—N/a	366
Agir	Idalécio Carone	Entrepreneur	Agir	2nd alternate senator: Luciano de Souza	—N/a	366
Socialism and Liberty Party (PSOL)	Gilberto Campos	State Revenue Service tax auditor	Socialism and Liberty Party (PSOL)	1st alternate senator: Rafaella Machado	Commitment with Life: PSOL REDE Federation; Socialism and Liberty Party (PSOL); Sustainability Network (REDE); Solidariedade; Avante; Republican Party of the Social Order (PROS)	500
Socialism and Liberty Party (PSOL)	Gilberto Campos	State Revenue Service tax auditor	Socialism and Liberty Party (PSOL)	2nd alternate senator: Wilson Junior	Commitment with Life: PSOL REDE Federation; Socialism and Liberty Party (PSOL); Sustainability Network (REDE); Solidariedade; Avante; Republican Party of the Social Order (PROS)	500
Avante	Nelson Júnior	Evangelical pastor	Avante	1st alternate senator: Marcel Carone	—N/a	777
Avante	Nelson Júnior	Evangelical pastor	Avante	2nd alternate senator: Romeu Rocha	—N/a	777

== Opinion polls ==
=== Governor ===
==== First round ====
Pollster/client(s)	Date(s) conducted	Sample size	Casagrande PSB	Manato PL	Zanon PSD	Barcelos REDE	Teixeira NOVO	Souza PSTU	Paiva PRTB	Abst. Undec.	Lead
2022 election	2 October	—N/a	46.94%	38.48%	7.03%	6.51%	0.76%	0.22%	0.07%	9.99%	8.46%
IPEC	28–30 September	800	53%	23%	6%	6%	1%	1%	1%	10%	30%
RealTime Big Data	26–27 September	1,000	46%	26%	7%	6%	1%	1%	1%	13%	20%
Ipopes	21–26 September	1,260	40.48%	16.67%	7.30%	12.06%	0.87%	0.48%	0.40%	21.75%	23.81%
IPEC	19–21 September	800	53%	18%	7%	7%	0%	1%	0%	15%	35%
IPEC	30 August–1 September	800	56%	19%	5%	5%	1%	3%	1%	11%	37%
RealTime Big Data	23–24 August	1,500	49%	21%	4%	6%	2%	2%	0%	16%	28%
Ipopes	19–23 August	1,260	44.60%	12.16%	7.30%	7.94%	0.48%	0.87%	0.87%	25.79%	32.44%
IPEC	14–16 August	608	52%	10%	7%	5%	1%	2%	1%	22%	42%

==== Second round ====
Pollster/client(s)	Date(s) conducted	Sample size	Casagrande PSB	Manato PL	Abst. Undec.	Lead
2022 election	30 October	—N/a	53.8%	46.2%	6.08%	7.6%
IPEC	27–29 October	800	50%	44%	6%	6%
RealTime Big Data	25–26 October	1,000	48%	46%	6%	2%
Perfil	24–26 October	1,200	51.58%	39.67%	8.75%	11.91%
Veritá	19–21 October	1,512	46.1%	50.3%	3.5%	4.2%
IPEC	19–21 October	800	49%	40%	10%	9%
RealTime Big Data	18–19 October	1,000	48%	45%	6%	3%
Veritá	13–16 October	1,512	46.2%	48.6%	5.2%	2.4%
RealTime Big Data	10–11 October	1,000	48%	42%	10%	6%

=== Senator ===
Pollster/client(s)	Date(s) conducted	Sample size	Malta PL	Freitas MDB	Musso Republicanos	Campos PSOL	Júnior Avante	Lugato DC	Skiter PSTU	Carone Agir	Bungenstab PRTB	Abst. Undec.	Lead
2022 election	2 October	—N/a	41.95%	38.17%	17.25%	1.03%	0.60%	0.41%	0.29%	0.17%	0.13%	15.33%	3.78%
IPEC	28–30 September	800	29%	35%	9%	1%	2%	1%	1%	2%	0%	21%	6%
RealTime Big Data	26–27 September	1,000	32%	32%	8%	1%	1%	1%	0%	0%	1%	24%	Tie
Ipopes	21–26 September	1,260	25.24%	22.46%	11.83%	0.95%	1.11%	—N/a	0.87%	0.63%	—N/a	36.9%	2.78%
IPEC	19–21 September	800	27%	31%	8%	1%	1%	2%	1%	2%	0%	27%	4%
IPEC	30 August–1 September	800	27%	27%	5%	1%	3%	3%	0%	4%	1%	30%	Tie
RealTime Big Data	23–24 August	1,500	33%	20%	4%	2%	1%	2%	1%	1%	0%	37%	13%
Ipopes	19–23 August	1,260	27.70%	17.78%	4.92%	1.27%	1.59%	0%	1.11%	1.75%	0%	43.89%	9.92%
IPEC	14–16 August	608	29%	22%	4%	2%	1%	—N/a	1%	5%	0%	35%	7%

== Results ==
=== Governor ===
Candidate	Running mate	Party	First round		Second round	
Candidate	Running mate	Party	Votes	%	Votes	%
Renato Casagrande (incumbent)	Ricardo Ferraço (PSDB)	PSB	976,652	46.94	1,171,288	53.80
Carlos Manato	Bruno Lourenço (PTB)	PL	800,598	38.48	1,006,021	46.20
Guerino Zanon	Marcus Magalhães	PSD	146,177	7.03		
Audifax Barcelos	Carla Andressa (Solidariedade)	REDE	135,512	6.51		
Aridelmo Teixeira	Camila Domingues	NOVO	15,786	0.76		
Vinicius Souza	Soraia Chiabai	PSTU	4,505	0.22		
Cláudio Paiva	Aurélio Ferreguetti	PRTB	1,418	0.07		
Total			2,080,648	100.00	2,177,309	100.00
Valid votes			2,080,648	90.01	2,177,309	93.92
Invalid votes			129,835	5.62	94,782	4.09
Blank votes			101,146	4.38	46,259	2.00
Total votes			2,311,629	100.00	2,318,350	100.00
Registered voters/turnout			2,917,714	79.23	2,917,714	79.46
PSB hold						

=== Senator ===
Candidate	Party	Votes	%
Magno Malta	PL	821,189	41.95
Rose de Freitas (incumbent)	MDB	747,104	38.17
Erick Musso	Republicanos	337,642	17.25
Gilberto Campos	PSOL	20,138	1.03
Nelson Júnior	Avante	11,787	0.60
Julio Cesar Lugato	DC	7,978	0.41
Filipe Skiter	PSTU	5,621	0.29
Idalécio Carone	Agir	3,357	0.17
Antonio Bungenstab	PRTB	2,534	0.13
Total		1,957,350	100.00
Valid votes		1,957,350	84.67
Invalid votes		173,933	7.52
Blank votes		180,346	7.80
Total votes		2,311,629	100.00
Registered voters/turnout		2,917,714	79.23
PL gain from MDB			

=== Chamber of Deputies ===
Party or alliance		Votes	%	Seats	+/–
Progressistas		296,301	14.21	2	▲1
Liberal Party		220,995	10.60	1	Steady
Brazil of Hope	Workers' Party	208,654	10.01	2	▲1
Brazil of Hope	Communist Party of Brazil	8,015	0.38	0	Steady
Brazil of Hope	Green Party	1,118	0.05	0	Steady
Republicanos		200,917	9.64	2	▲1
Brazilian Socialist Party		194,539	9.33	1	▼1
Podemos		193,999	9.31	2	▲2
Brazilian Labour Party		153,591	7.37	0	Steady
Democratic Labour Party		125,713	6.03	0	▼1
Brazil Union		123,947	5.95	0	New
Social Christian Party		123,750	5.94	0	Steady
Always Forward	Brazilian Social Democracy Party	95,632	4.59	0	Steady
Always Forward	Cidadania	1,713	0.08	0	▼1
Patriota		75,289	3.61	0	▼1
PSOL REDE Federation	Sustainability Network	21,739	1.04	0	▼1
PSOL REDE Federation	Socialism and Liberty Party	13,797	0.66	0	Steady
New Party		8,819	0.42	0	Steady
Solidariedade		3,633	0.17	0	Steady
Avante		3,145	0.15	0	▼1
Social Democratic Party		2,644	0.13	0	▼1
Christian Democracy		2,070	0.10	0	▼1
Brazilian Labour Renewal Party		2,023	0.10	0	Steady
Brazilian Woman's Party		1,391	0.07	0	Steady
Republican Party of the Social Order		534	0.03	0	▼1
Agir		462	0.02	0	Steady
Total		2,084,430	100.00	10	–
Valid votes		2,084,430	90.17		
Invalid votes		81,978	3.55		
Blank votes		145,221	6.28		
Total votes		2,311,629	100.00		
Registered voters/turnout		2,917,714	79.23		

=== Legislative Assembly ===
Party or alliance		Votes	%	Seats	+/–
Liberal Party		265,398	12.78	5	▲5
Republicanos		258,409	12.44	4	▲2
Brazilian Socialist Party		164,155	7.90	3	▲1
Brazil of Hope	Workers' Party	146,606	7.06	2	▲1
Brazil of Hope	Green Party	13,711	0.66	0	▼2
Brazil of Hope	Communist Party of Brazil	11,657	0.56	0	Steady
Brazil Union		144,715	6.97	2	New
Podemos		140,112	6.74	3	▲3
Progressistas		137,514	6.62	2	▲1
Always Forward	Brazilian Social Democracy Party	113,730	5.47	2	▼1
Always Forward	Cidadania	32,895	1.58	1	Steady
Democratic Labour Party		109,905	5.29	2	▲1
Brazilian Labour Party		96,412	4.64	1	Steady
Patriota		81,389	3.92	1	Steady
Social Christian Party		73,749	3.55	1	▲1
PSOL REDE Federation	Socialism and Liberty Party	56,100	2.70	1	▲1
PSOL REDE Federation	Sustainability Network	49,327	2.37	0	▼1
Social Democratic Party		48,628	2.34	0	▼1
Solidariedade		44,589	2.15	0	Steady
Brazilian Democratic Movement		30,907	1.49	0	▼2
Christian Democracy		25,642	1.23	0	▼1
Agir		13,358	0.64	0	Steady
Brazilian Woman's Party		9,562	0.46	0	Steady
Republican Party of the Social Order		7,278	0.35	0	▼1
Brazilian Labour Renewal Party		1,526	0.07	0	Steady
Total		2,077,274	100.00	30	–
Valid votes		2,077,274	89.86		
Invalid votes		94,330	4.08		
Blank votes		140,025	6.06		
Total votes		2,311,629	100.00		
Registered voters/turnout		2,917,714	79.23		
