= Camila Valadão =

Brazilian social worker, feminist activist and politician

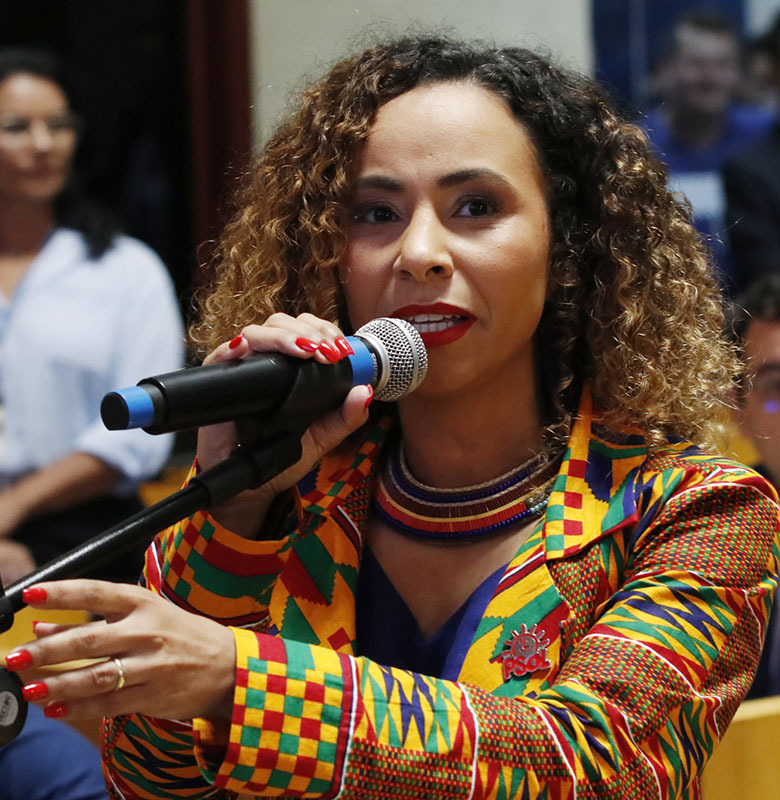

State deputy of Espírito Santo
- Incumbent
- Assumed office 1 January 2023

Councilwoman for Vitória
- In office 1 January 2021 – 1 January 2023

Personal details
- Born: Camila Costa Valadão; 29 August 1984 (age 42) Serra, Espírito Santo, Brazil
- Party: PSOL
- Education: Federal University of Espírito Santo (PhD); University of Havana (PhD)

Camila Costa Valadão (born 29 August 1984) is a Brazilian social worker, feminist activist, and politician. She was elected as a councilwoman in the city of Vitória, in the state of Espírito Santo, for the Socialism and Liberty Party (PSOL) in 2020. She became the first Black woman on the city council. She was later elected as a state deputy in Espírito Santo in 2022.

== Biography ==
Valadão was born in 1984 in Serra. Her political career began with the students' movement even before she enrolled at the Federal University of Espírito Santo (UFES), where she studied Social Services in 2004. She took part in the Free Academic Center of Social Services (CALSS) and the Central Students' Directory (DCE). During this time, she participated in mobilization efforts to various causes such as politics related to state and national education, protests against the increase in the cost of public transport, and for the demarcation of land for the Tupiniquim and Guarani peoples in Aracruz.

After graduating, she became a social worker and was the president of the Regional Council of Social Services (CRESS), along with being a member of the State Council of Human Rights (CEDH), supporting various causes such as the fight against proposals for mandatory hospitalizations. She also was a member of the Capixaba Youth Observatory (OSCIP), founded in 2012 by researchers, activists, and young people of different educational backgrounds in Espírito Santo. She was Coordinator-General of the Proteção de Jovens em Território Vulnerável (Protejo) project, developed mainly in the Feu Rosa and Vila Nova de Colares neighborhoods of Serra, as part of the National Project of Public Safety with Citizenry (Pronasci) and also participated in the Lethal Violence against Adolescents and Children Program (PRVL), coordinated by the Favelas Observatory.

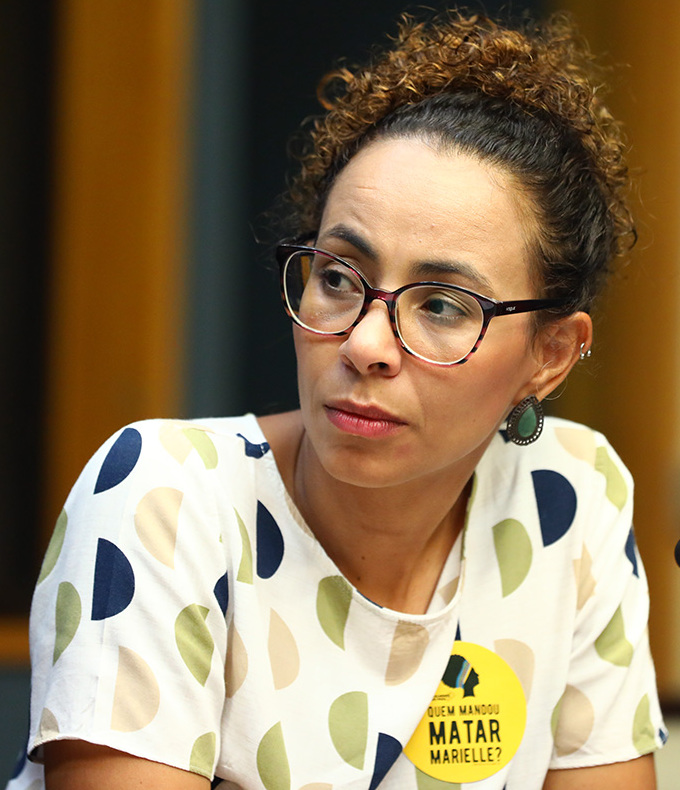
Valadão during a regular session of the Legislative Assembly of Espírito Santo (2023)

All the while, she furthered her academic career, earning a master's and doctorate in Social Politics from UFES. Her master's dissertation on the public politics for the youth in Espírito Santo. She completed her doctoral thesis on social politics during the transition to socialism in Cuba after the revolution. Her research would include an additional doctorate from the Faculty of Economics at the University of Havana in Havana, Cuba. She went on to become a substitute professor at the Department of Social Services at her alma mater, UFES.

She began her political career by running for different offices, always as a part of PSOL. In 2014, she was a gubernatorial candidate in Espírito Santo, finishing in fourth place with 1.1% of the vote. Two years after, she became a candidate for city councilor in Vitória, becoming the fifth most voted candidate. PSOL, however, did not have enough votes to hit the electoral coefficient for candidates from the party to be able to take office. In 2018, she ran for office again to become a state deputy, but was not elected. In 2020, with new electoral laws in place, Valadão increased her vote share in relation to the minimum required vote share for the city, with 5,626 votes, the second most voted candidate, guaranteeing her a seat. Thus, she became the first Black woman elected to the Municipal Chamber of Vitória, as well as the first person from PSOL elected in the state.

In 2022, she was once again a candidate for state deputy, being elected with the fourth highest number of votes in state, with 52,221 votes as part of the PSOL-Rede Federation. She became the most voted woman in the state's state assembly elections, passing the record set by Sueli Vidigal in 2002, who received 36,500 votes.

== Ilma Viana mandate ==
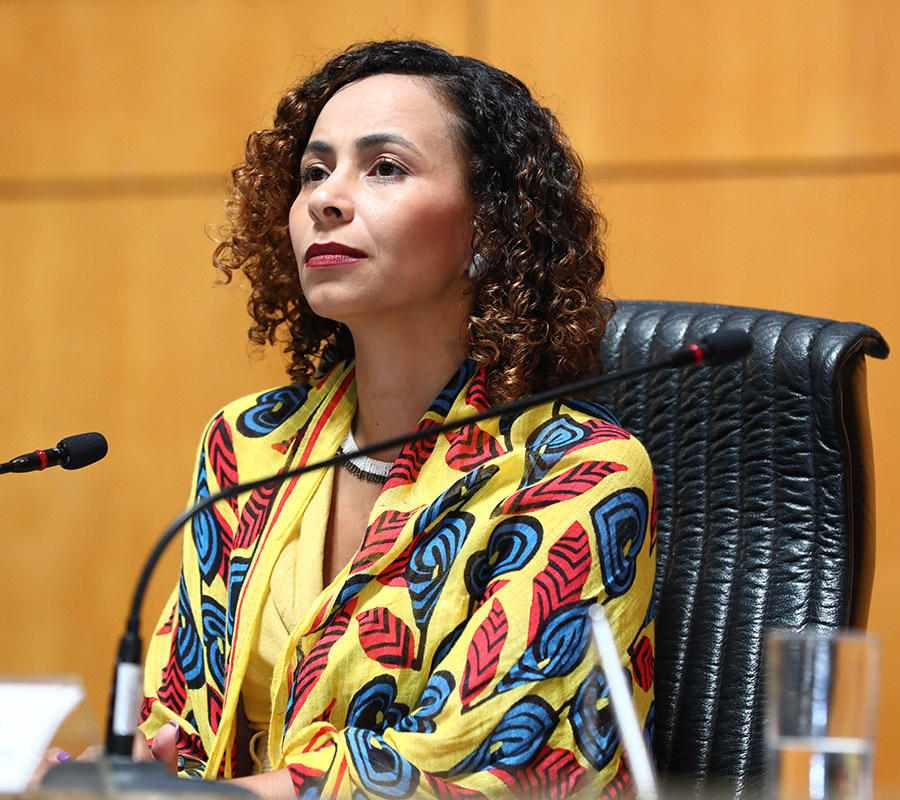
Valadão during a session of the commission to Defend Human Rights in the Legislative Assembly of Espírito Santo (2023)

Valadão took office along with 14 other elected candidates to the municipal chamber of Vitória on 1 January 2021, with Karla Coser (PT) being the only other woman. Valadão named her mandate as a tribute to Ilma Viana, a teacher, samba musician and Black movement activist who was also from PSOL, who died in 2017.

From the beginning of her mandate, she has been a constant voice of opposition to mayor Lorenzo Pazolini (Republicanos), having supported his opponent in the 2020 election, former mayor João Coser (PT). Pazolini ultimately won. The highlights of her mandate included accomplishments related to the rights of women, Black people, LGBT people and municipal employees, as well as health, the environment, accessibility, education and infant care.

During her first year, she denounced gender-based political violence against her and Coser, having accused councilor Gilvan da Federal, of Patriota, in particular of aggressive behavior, including criticizing her mode of dress, demanding that she shut up, and calling her a "satanist" and "baby killer" due to her pro-choice stances. The verbal attacks resulted in protests supporting Valadão.

Valadão was the author of proposal 39/2021, which made Vitória the first city in Espírito Santo to institute a focus date to combat gendered political violence. The following definition was laid forth by the law: physical acts, threats or psychological intimidation and/or discrimination practiced with the objective of attacking their lives, assaulting, threatening, offending or illegitimately limiting the full development and political participation of elected representatives, candidates, pre-candidates, and party leaders. It was celebrated on 14 March, the anniversary of the assassination of Rio de Janeiro councilwoman Marielle Franco in 2018.

In July 2022, the Centro de Apoio aos Direitos Humanos Valdicio Barbosa dos Santos, an entity with a consultive link to the United Nations, filed a complaint to the ONU about repeated instances of systematic gender-based political violence against Valadão and the vice-governor of Espírito Santo, Jacqueline Moraes. These complaints were part of a larger complaint about verbal violence and intimidation attempts against Valadão.

== Electoral history ==
The following is the electoral history of Camila Valadão:

| Year | Election | Position | Party | Coalition | Votes | Result |
|---|---|---|---|---|---|---|
| 2014 | Espírito Santo state elections | Governor | PSOL | | 21,044 (1.10%) | Lost |
| 2016 | Vitória municipal elections | Councilor | PSOL | Frente de Esquerda (PSOL, PCB) | 3,727 (2.06%) | Lost |
| 2018 | Espírito Santo state elections | State Deputy | PSOL | Frente de Esquerda Socialista (PSOL, PCB) | 16,829 (0.86%) | Lost |
| 2020 | Vitória municipal elections | Councilor | PSOL | | 5,625 (3.34%) | Won |
| 2022 | Espírito Santo state elections | State Deputy | PSOL | Federação PSOL REDE (PSOL, REDE) | 52,221 (2.49%) | Won |
| 2024 | Vitória municipal elections | Mayor | PSOL | Federação PSOL REDE (PSOL, REDE) | 10,773 (5.74%) | Lost |
