= Rita Camata =

Brazilian politician

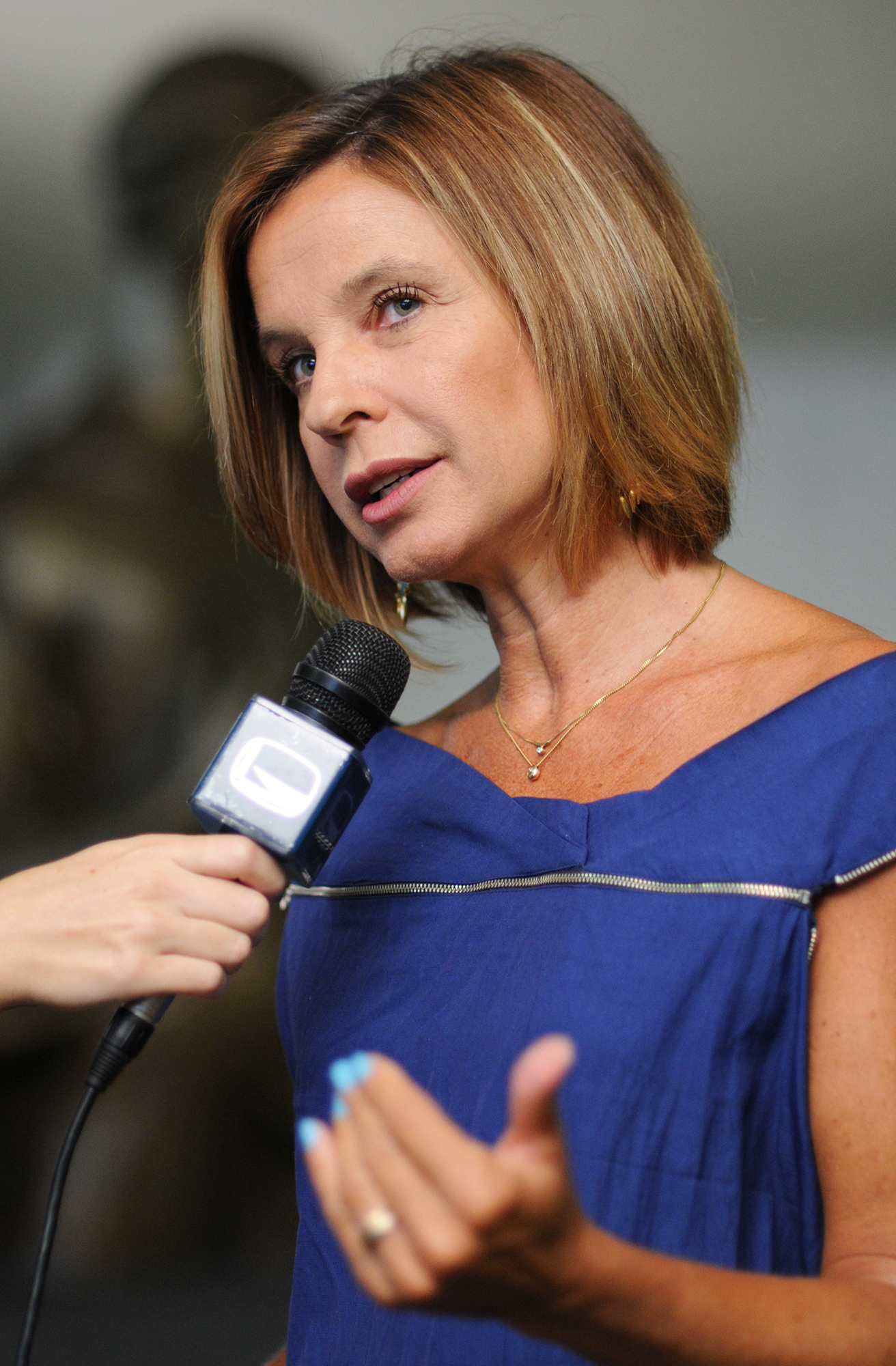

Federal deputy for Espírito Santo
- In office February 1, 1987 – 31 January 2011

First Lady of Espírito Santo
- In office March 31, 1983 – May 14, 1986

Secretary of Development, Infrastructure and Transport of Espítrito Santo
- In office 2003–2006

Personal details
- Born: Rita de Cássia Paste; January 1, 1961 (age 65) Conceição do Castelo, Espírito Santo, Brazil
- Party: Brazilian Social Democracy Party (2009–present)
- Other political affiliations: Brazilian Democratic Movement (1980–2009)
- Spouse: Gerson Camata (1981–2018; his death)
- Education: Federal University of Espírito Santo
- Occupation: Journalist and politician

Rita de Cássia Paste Camata (born January 1, 1961) is a Brazilian politician and journalist.

== Early life ==
She was born in Conceição do Castelo, to Antônio Paste and Anidis Venturim Paste. In 1981 she attended the Federal University of Espírito Santo and married the federal deputy Gerson Camata becoming First Lady of Espírito Santo after Gerson being elected state governor in 1982. Rita got her degree in 1985, and directed the Unidade Comunitária de Integração Social (Social Integration Community Unit – UCIS) during her husband tenure position that assured her political stature.

== Political career ==
Member of the Brazilian Democratic Movement Party since 1982, Camata was elected president of the party's municipal directory in Vitória in 1985 by defeating also journalist Rose de Freitas and that same year she supported the winning candidacy of Hermes Laranja to mayor of the capital of Espírito Santo. Elected federal deputy in 1986, 1990, 1994 and 1998, she participated in the National Constituent Assembly that drafted the 1988 Brazilian Constitution and voted for the impeachment of President Fernando Collor on September 29, 1992.

In 2002, she was a candidate for vice president, with José Serra leading the coalition Grande Aliança (PSDB-PMDB). They were defeated in the second round by Luiz Inácio Lula da Silva-José Alencar ticket. She was appointed Secretary of Development, Infrastructure and Transport of Espírito Santo in the Paulo Hartung government, and was elected federal deputy for the fifth time in 2006.

She joined PSDB in 2009 and unsuccessfully ran for senator for Espírito Santo in 2010.

Her best known achievements in Brazil are the Statute of the Child and Adolescent (Estatuto da Criança e do Adolescente), reported by her and sanctioned by President Fernando Collor de Mello and the Fiscal Responsibility Law (Lei de Responsabilidade Fiscal), reported by her and sanctioned by President Fernando Henrique Cardoso.
