= Da Vitória =

Brazilian politician (born 1971)

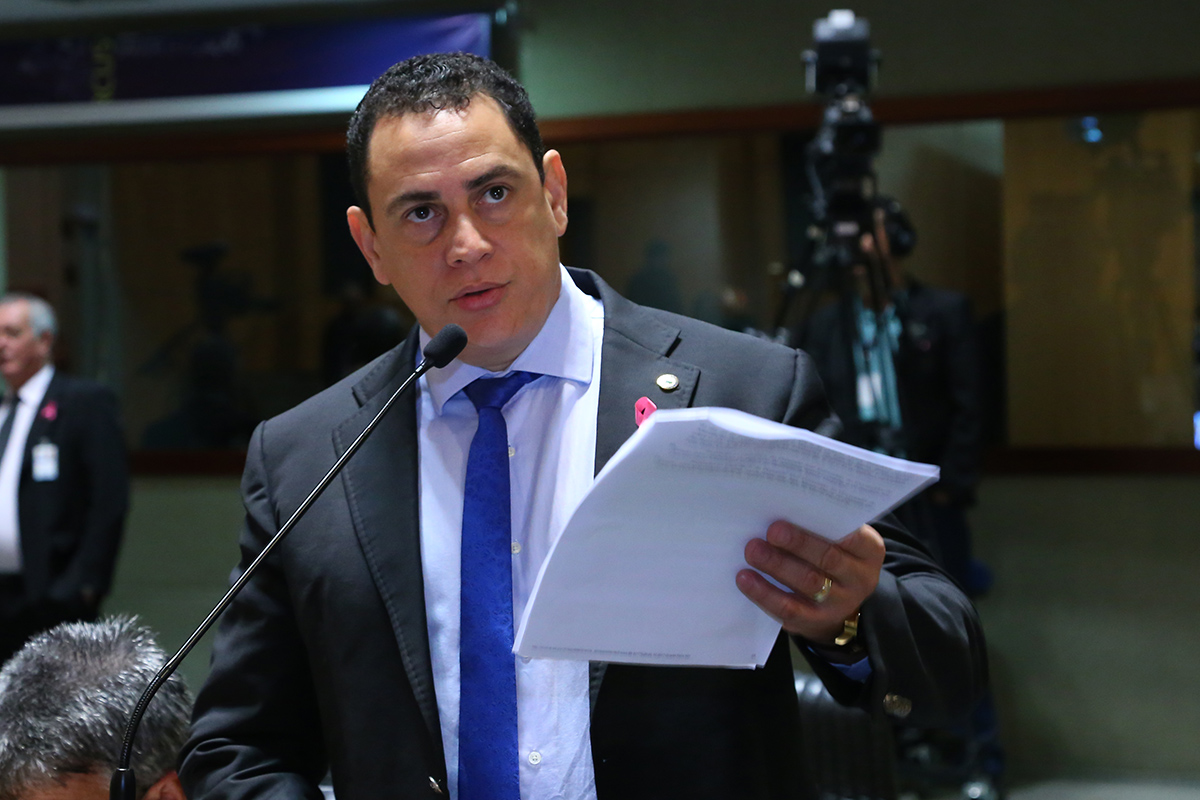
- Vitória in 2017

Member of the Chamber of Deputies
- Incumbent
- Assumed office 1 February 2019
- Constituency: Espírito Santo

Member of the Legislative Assembly of Espírito Santo
- In office 1 February 2007 – 1 February 2019
- Constituency: At-large

Personal details
- Born: Josias Mário da Vitória; 2 June 1971 (age 55) Colatina, Espírito Santo, Brazil
- Party: PP (since 2022)
- Other political affiliations: PDT (2006–2018); Cidadania (2018–2022)
- Profession: Military police officer

Josias Mário da Vitória (born 2 June 1971), known mononymously as Da Vitória, is a Brazilian politician serving as a member of the Chamber of Deputies since 2019. From 2007 to 2019, he was a member of the Legislative Assembly of Espírito Santo.
