= Macaroni (disambiguation) =

Macaroni is a kind of pasta.

Macaroni may also refer to:

- Sam Macaroni (1975–2025), American actor, film director and writer
- Macaroni (fashion), also spelled maccaroni, an 18th-century English fashion trend
- Macaroni (film), a 1985 film directed by Ettore Scola, starring Jack Lemmon and Marcello Mastroianni
- Macaroni (horse) (1860–1887), winner of the 1863 Epsom Derby
- Macaroni penguin, a species of penguin found in the Southern Hemisphere
- Macaronic language, texts written in a mixture of languages

== See also ==
- Macarani, a municipality in Brazil
- Macaron, a meringue-based dessert
- Macaroon, a type of cake or cookie made with ground nuts
