= Gerson Camata =

Brazilian journalist and politician

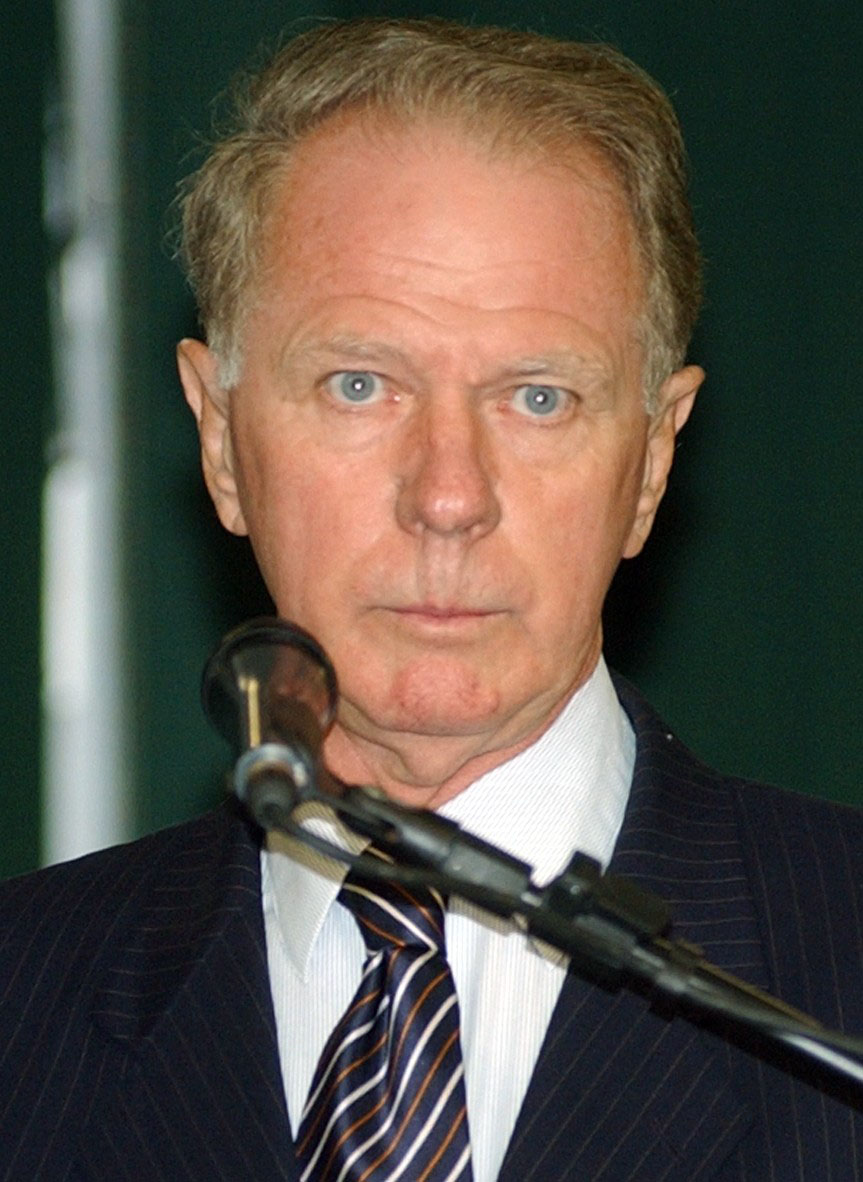
- Camata in 2008

Senator for Espírito Santo
- In office February 1, 1987 – February 1, 2011

Governor of Espírito Santo
- In office March 15, 1983 – May 14, 1986
- Vice Governor: José Moraes
- Preceded by: Eurico Resende
- Succeeded by: José Moraes

Federal Deputy for Espírito Santo
- In office February 1, 1975 – February 1, 1983

State Deputy of Espírito Santo
- In office February 1, 1971 – February 1, 1975

Councillor of Vitória
- In office February 1, 1967 – February 1, 1971

Personal details
- Born: June 29, 1941 Castelo, Espírito Santo
- Died: 26 December 2018 (aged 77) Praia do Canto, Vitória, Espírito Santo
- Manner of death: Assassination by firearm
- Party: Brazilian Social Democracy Party
- Other political affiliations: ARENA
- Spouse: Rita Camata (1981–2018; his death)
- Education: Federal University of Espírito Santo
- Occupation: Journalist; Politician

Gerson Camata (June 29, 1941 – December 26, 2018) was a Brazilian journalist and politician. Camata served in Federal Senate for three terms from 1987 until 2011. He was also the first person directly elected Governor of Espírito Santo, an office he held from 1983 to 1986, following the restoration of democracy in the 1980s.

== Education ==
Camata graduated from Federal University of Espírito Santo with a degree in economics. He worked as a journalist and host for Radio Espírito Santo, where he covered crime and the police.

== Political career ==
In 1967, Camata began his political career as a Vitória city alderman for the National Renewal Alliance (ARENA), the party of the military dictatorship that ruled Brazil at the time. He served on the city council from 1967 until 1970, when he was elected to the Legislative Assembly of Espírito Santo as an ARENA state deputy.

In 1974, Camata was elected to the federal Chamber of Deputies as a member of ARENA. He won re-election to a second term in the Chamber of Deputies in 1978. In 1979, with the legalization of opposition parties, Camata left ARENA and joined the newly formed Brazilian Democratic Movement Party (PMDB) in opposition to the government.

In 1982, Camata announced his candidacy for Governor of Espírito Santo. He won the 1982 Espírito Santo gubernatorial election with 67% of the vote, becoming the first person directly elected as Espírito Santo's governor during the transition to democracy. He served as governor from 1983 until 1986, when he resigned to run for the Federal Senate. His vice governor, José Moraes, succeeded Camata as the new governor of Espírito Santo.

Camata was elected to his first term in the Federal Senate in the 1986 Brazilian legislative election. He won re-election to Senate in the 1994 and 2002 legislative elections. Camata served the Senate for twenty-four years (and three full terms) until his retirement in 2011. During his final term, Camata simultaneously served as the state Secretary of Development, Infrastructure and Transport under Governor Paulo Hartung, beginning in May 2006.

== Death ==
On December 26, 2018, Camata was gunned down by a former aide in the Praia do Canto neighborhood of Vitória, Espírito Santo. He was 77 years old. The shooting occurred outside a restaurant near the intersection of Chapot Presvot and Joaquim Lyrio streets. Camata was shot in the left shoulder. The bullet exited through his right shoulder, causing damage to his internal organs. He did not survive the attack and died at the age of 77.

Police captured the assailant, Marcos Vinícius Moreira Andrade, a former aide to Camata, just minutes after the attack.

Camata, a resident of the Ilha do Frade neighborhood of Vitória, was survived by his wife, Rita Camata, a former state and federal deputy, and their two children, Bruno and Enza Rafaela. Espírito Santo Governor Paulo Hartung declared seven days of mourning following Camata's murder.
