= 2014 Espírito Santo general election =

2014 Espírito Santo gubernatorial election
- October 5, 2014
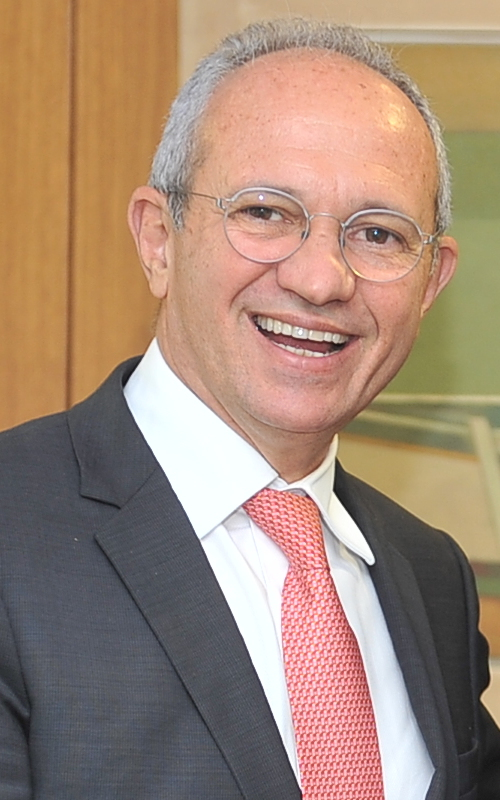

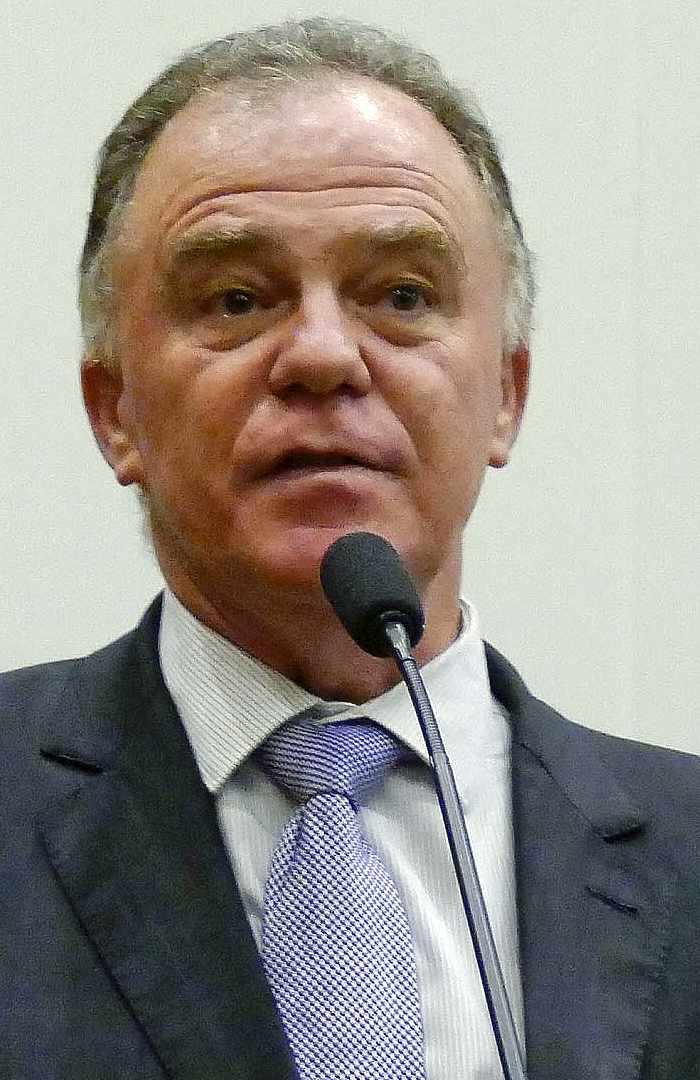
Nominee	Paulo Hartung	Renato Casagrande
Party	MDB	PSB
Running mate	César Colnago	Fabrício Gandini
Popular vote	1,020,440	751,293
Percentage	53.44%	39.34%
Governor before election
Renato Casagrande
PSB
Elected Governor
Paulo Hartung
MDB

The Espírito Santo gubernatorial election was held on 5 October 2014 to elect the Governor of the state of Espírito Santo. Governor Renato Casagrande lost a bid for a second term to former Governor Paulo Hartung.

== Candidates ==
- Roberto Carlos 13 (PT) - State Deputy for Espírito Santo (elected in 2010); former Councillor for Serra (elected in 2004, 2008)
  - Celia Tavares 13 (PT) - University Professor
- Paulo Hartung 15 (PMDB) - Former Governor of Espírito Santo (elected in 2002, 2006)
  - César Colnago 15 (PSDB) - Federal Deputy for Espírito Santo (elected in 2010)
- Mauro Ribeiro 21 (PCB) - CETURB Employees Association President
  - Aurelio Carlos 21 (PCB) - Journalist
- Renato Casagrande 40 (PSB) - incumbent Governor (elected in 2010)
  - Fabrício Gandini 40 (PPS) - President, Vitória City Council (2013/2014); Vitória City Councilmember (elected in 2008, 2012)
- Camila Valadão 50 (PSOL) - Social worker and activist
  - Wilson Junior 50 (PSOL) - Educator

=== Coalitions ===
Candidate	Running mate	Coalition
Roberto Carlos Teles Braga; PT	Celia Tavares; PT	"With The Force of the Capixaba People" (PT, PDT)
Paulo Hartung; MDB	César Colnago; PSDB	"The Espírito Santo May Much More" (MDB, PSDB, PROS, DEM, SD, PEN, PRP)
Mauro Ribeiro; PCB	Aurélio Carlos; PCB	"Frente Classista e Socialista" (PCB, PSTU)
Renato Casagrande; PSB	Fabrício Gandini; PPS	"To Front Espírito Santo" (PSB, PPS, PRB, PTC, PR, PTN, PMN, PSL, PTdoB, PRTB, PV, PCdoB, PSD, PP, PSC, PPL, PTB, PSDC, PHS)
Camila Valadão; PSOL	Wilson Júnior; PSOL	-

== Opinion Polling ==
Date	Institute	Candidate					Blank/Null/Undecided
Date	Institute	Renato Casagrande (PSB)	Paulo Hartung (PMDB)	Camila Valadão (PSOL)	Roberto Carlos (PT)	Mauro Ribeiro (PCB)	Blank/Null/Undecided
September 17–19, 2014	Brand	36%	45%	2%	3%	0.2%	14%

== Results ==
Espírito Santo Gubernatorial Election
Party	Candidate	Votes	%	±%
MDB	Paulo Hartung	1,020,440	53.44%	
PSB	Renato Casagrande (inc.)	751,293	39.34%	
PT	Roberto Carlos	114,691	6.01%	
PSOL	Camila Valadão	21,044	1.10%	
PCB	Mauro Ribeiro	2,126	0.11%	
Majority		269,147	14.10%	
MDB gain from PSB		Swing		
