= Marcos do Val =

Brazilian politician (born 1971)

- Official portrait

Senator for Espírito Santo
- Incumbent
- Assumed office 1 February 2019

Personal details
- Born: Marcos Ribeiro do Val; 15 June 1971 (age 55) Vitória, Espírito Santo, Brazil
- Party: PODE (2019–present)
- Other political affiliations: PSB (2015–2018); PPS (2018–2019)
- Profession: Politician
- Awards: Order of Rio Branco (Grand Officer); Order of Aeronautical Merit (Grand Officer) (Note: Portuguese: Ordem do Mérito Aeronáutico - Grande-Oficial); Order of Defence Merit (Grand Officer) (Note: Portuguese: Ordem do Mérito da Defesa - Grande-Oficial); Peacemaker Medal (Note: Portuguese: Medalha do Pacificador)
- Website: marcosdoval.com.br

Military service
- Allegiance: Brazil
- Branch/service: Brazilian Army
- Rank: Soldier
- Unit: 38th Infantry Battalion

Marcos Ribeiro do Val (born 15 June 1971) is a Brazilian politician and a member of Podemos. In the 2018 state election, he was elected senator for Espírito Santo.

== Biography ==
=== Brazilian Army ===
In his youth, Marcos do Val was part of the 38th Infantry Battalion of the Brazilian Army, headquartered in Espírito Santo.

=== Police training ===
In the beginning of the 1990s, do Val founded CATI, a security company focused on advanced training for police officers, including non-lethal tactical restraints.

According to do Val, his motivation for developing these techniques was to reduce violence and fatalities in unsuccessful police approaches caused by improper training. The basis of the techniques he created came from his experience serving in the Brazilian Army as well as his expertise in the Japanese martial art of Aikido.

=== Overseas work ===
One of do Val's training classes was witnessed by an American SWAT officer, who subsequently invited him to train the SWAT team in Dallas, Texas. He later worked with police units in Beaumont and Rowlett, Texas. He became part of the Texas Tactical Police Officers Association, which gathers instructor teams to enhance their skills and improve their knowledge.

Do Val also led classes for the FBI, DEA, U.S. Marshals, and the United States Armed Forces, as well as for Vatican security and the Carabinieri of Rome.

=== Eloá Pimentel case ===
In October 2008, following the tragic ending of the Eloá Pimentel case, do Val was interviewed by TV Globo's Fantástico after he criticized the failures of the Military Police of São Paulo State and governor José Serra. He accused the state government of interfering in police activity, which he said partly contributed to the fatality. His statements received criticism from some people, among them Veja journalist Reinaldo Azevedo, who wrote an article on his webpage titled "Who really is the supposed SWAT specialist", in which he claimed that Marcos was just a taekwondo teacher. In response, do Val filed a lawsuit against Azevedo, who eventually removed the article from his website.

=== Political career ===
In the 2018 Espírito Santo gubernatorial election, do Val, a member of the Popular Socialist Party, was elected state senator, receiving 863,359 votes (24.08% of the valid votes). His party was later renamed Cidadania (English: Citizenship). In August 2019, do Val left Cidadania and joined Podemos.

Do Val ran in the 2026 Espírito Santo gubernatorial election as a candidate for the Avante party but did not win a seat.

== Controversy ==
=== Disagreement with Eduardo Bolsonaro ===
In February 2017, do Val had a disagreement with congressman Eduardo Bolsonaro, when the lawmaker said he was offended by statements do Val made about him. Days later, do Val posted a video explaining his position and an apology for what, according to him, was a misunderstanding.

=== Overseas travel with girlfriend ===
From 25 April to 5 May 2019, do Val took his girlfriend Brunella Poltronier Miguez, a member of his staff, on a trip to the United States, using funds provided by the Brazilian senate. Miguez had been dismissed from her job the day before the trip and rehired as director-general one week following the trip, thus obviating the need for do Val to seek authorization for Miguez to travel with him on the senate's expense. Do Val was asked about the event by the press but refused to provide comment.

=== Disagreements with Flávio Dino ===
==== Fatphobic post ====
After he questioned Justice Minister Flávio Dino during a session of the Senate Public Security Commission about the 8 January 2023 coup attempt and later defended the minister's firing, do Val received a harsh response from Dino. He subsequently made fatphobic posts about the minister on social media. It was later revealed in the press, with accompanying photos, that do Val had struggled with obesity himself and had undergone bariatric surgery in the past.

==== Genital comparison ====
In another run-in with Dino, in June 2023, do Val compared the size of his genitals with that of the minister by posting individual images of the two on social media, both wearing swimming trunks, with the caption: "I'll show you who's taller and who has the better gun!" He later deleted the image, but the post had already gone viral.

=== 8 January attack investigation ===
On 15 June 2023, the Brazilian federal police, authorized by Supreme Federal Court justice Alexandre de Moraes, searched residences linked to the senator, who was investigated for obstructing investigations of the 8 January coup attempt in Brasília. Do Val claimed that the judicial order was a case of political prosecution which he had expected, but not on his birthday. The senator's Twitter account was also blocked.

O Globo had access to the federal police report, revealing that do Val had boasted in a number of WhatsApp groups that he had the fate of two presidents of the republic in his hands: "I have a bomb in hand to destroy Bolsonaro and another one to destroy Lula". He also said he was responsible for Bolsonaro taking refuge in the United States after he lost the 2022 election: "I was invited by him [Bolsonaro] to do this. As member of CCAI [Mixed Intelligence Activities Control Commission], I started to wind it up to see how far it would go. When it was about to happen, I informed him that he would be committing a very serious crime against democracy and, from there, I reported it to the responsible authority. It was because of this that he fled to the USA".

Do Val returned to the senate on 3 August 2023, and all charges against him were dropped on 4 September 2026.

== Trivia ==
Do Val participated in the production of the 2010 action film Elite Squad: The Enemy Within as advisor and trainer.
