= Fabiano Contarato =

Brazilian law professor, police chief, and politician

- Official portrait

Senator for Espírito Santo
- Incumbent
- Assumed office 1 February 2019

Personal details
- Born: 20 June 1966 (age 60) Nova Venécia, Espírito Santo, Brazil
- Party: PT (2021–present)
- Other political affiliations: PR (2013–15); PSDB (2015–18); REDE (2018–21)
- Spouse: Rodrigo Groberio (m. 2017)
- Children: 2
- Occupation: Police chief; lecturer

Fabiano Contarato (born 20 June 1966) is a Brazilian law professor, police chief, and politician affiliated to the Workers' Party. He was the most voted candidate for the Brazilian Senate in the state of Espírito Santo during the 2018 Brazilian general election, with over one million votes; it was the first time he ran for an elected office. Contarato is the first openly LGBTQ person to be elected for the Brazilian Senate. His win unseated Magno Malta, a conservative evangelical pastor and close ally of far-right Brazilian President Jair Bolsonaro. In 2023, he was nominated as Head of the Worker's Party group in the Senate.

== Biography ==
=== Family, education and career ===
Born in Nova Venécia, Contarato was born on 20 June 1966, the son of a bus driver and a homemaker. He graduated in Law from Vila Velha University and holds postgraduate degrees in Criminal Law and Criminal Procedure from Gama Filho University. Later, he also worked in academia at Vila Velha University, as a professor of Criminal Law.

In 1992, Contarato was sworn in as a delegate of the Civil Police of the State of Espírito Santo. He was the head delegate of the Traffic Offenses Division, which allowed him to become known among the people of Espírito Santo. He also headed the State Department of Traffic (Detran-ES) and was the general inspector of Espírito Santo.

=== Personal life ===
Contarato stated that he discovered his homosexuality in his youth, although he "repressed it due to a moral restraint." In November 2017, he married physiotherapist Rodrigo Groberio. He is the father of Gabriel, adopted in 2017, and Mariana, adopted in 2020.
