= Ricardo Ferraço =

Brazilian politician and businessman

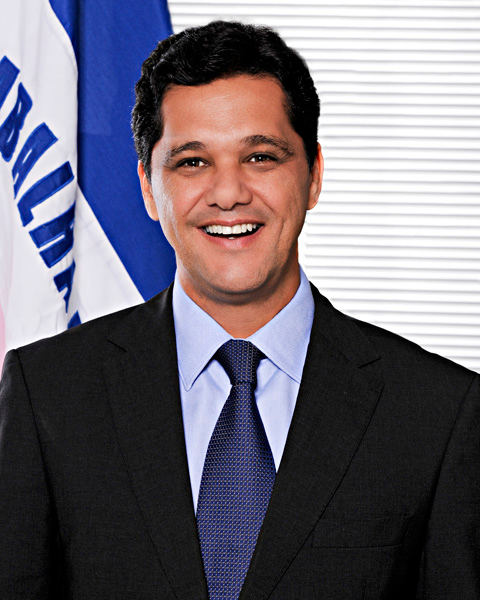

Vice Governor from Espírito Santo
- Incumbent
- Assumed office January 1, 2023
- Preceded by: Jacqueline Moraes
- In office January 1, 2007 – December 31, 2010
- Preceded by: Lelo Coimbra
- Succeeded by: Givaldo Vieira

Senator from Espírito Santo
- In office February 1, 2011 – January 31, 2019

Federal Deputy from Espírito Santo
- In office February 1, 1999 – January 31, 2003

State Deputy from Espírito Santo
- In office February 1, 1991 – January 31, 1999

Personal details
- Born: August 17, 1963 (age 62) Cachoeiro do Itapemirim, Brazil
- Party: PSDB
- Profession: Businessman

Ricardo Ferraço (born August 17, 1963) is a Brazilian politician and businessman. He has represented the state of Espírito Santo in the Federal Senate from 2011 to 2019. Previously, he was a Deputy for Espírito Santo from 1999 to 2003. He is a member of the Brazilian Social Democracy Party.

In 1997, he took over as Chief of Staff Secretary of the State Government of the Espírito Santo.

In 1998 he was elected to the Chamber of Deputies, and received the most votes in the state Espírito Santo, with about 75,000. He fulfilled his mandate in the federal chamber from 1999 to 2002.

He ran for election to the Federal Senate in 2002, but received fourth place, and Gerson Camata and Magno Malta won Espírito Santo's two state seats.

Before being elected Lieutenant Governor of Espírito Santo, he occupied the Ministry of Agriculture, Food Supply, Aquaculture and Fisheries (SEAG) during the first term of state Governor Paulo Hartung (2003–2006).

As deputy governor he took office in 2007, and became responsible also for the Department of Transport and Public Works (Setop) as well as the coordinator of the Project Management area of the State Government.

He was elected to the Federal Senate in the 2010 elections with 44.55% of the vote in his home state.

He supports the impeachment of incumbent President of Brazil Dilma Rousseff.
