= Erick Musso =

Brazilian politician (born 1987)

- Musso in 2019

President of the Legislative Assembly of Espírito Santo
- In office 1 February 2017 – 1 February 2023
- Preceded by: Theodorico Ferraço
- Succeeded by: Marcelo Santos

Personal details
- Born: 19 February 1987 (age 39)
- Party: Republicans (since 2018)

Erick Cabral Musso (born 19 February 1987) is a Brazilian politician serving as secretary of government of Vitória since 2025. He was a member of the Legislative Assembly of Espírito Santo from 2015 to 2023, and served as president of the Assembly from 2017 to 2023.
