= Macarani =

Municipality of Bahia, Brazil

- Municipality
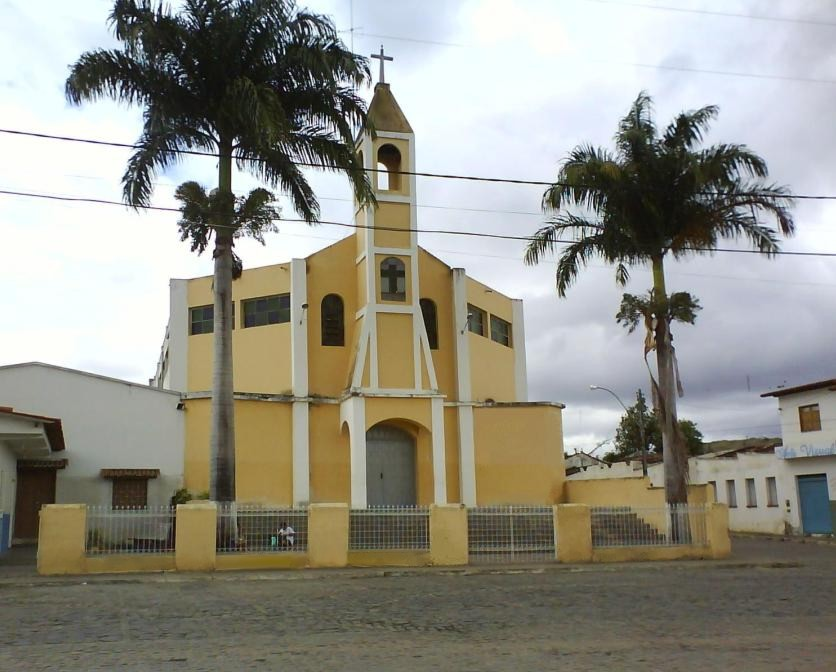

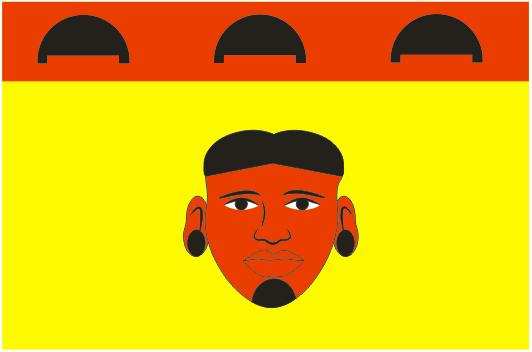
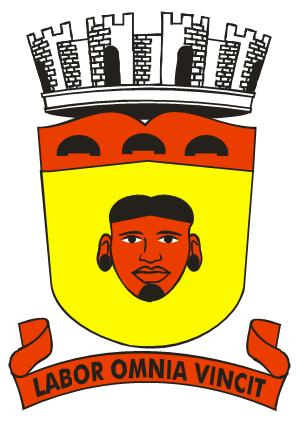
- Flag Coat of arms

- Location of Macarani in Bahia
- Coordinates: 15°33′S 40°24′W
- Country: Brazil
- Region: Nordeste
- State: Bahia

Area
  - Total: 529.600 sq mi (1,371.657 km^{2})

Population (2020)
  - Total: 18,909
- Time zone: UTC−3 (BRT)

Macarani is a municipality in the state of Bahia in the North-East region of Brazil. As of 2020, Macarani had a population of 18,909.

== Notable people ==
- Magno Malta — Politician

== See also ==
- List of municipalities in Bahia
