= Carlos Manato =

Brazilian politician (born 1957)

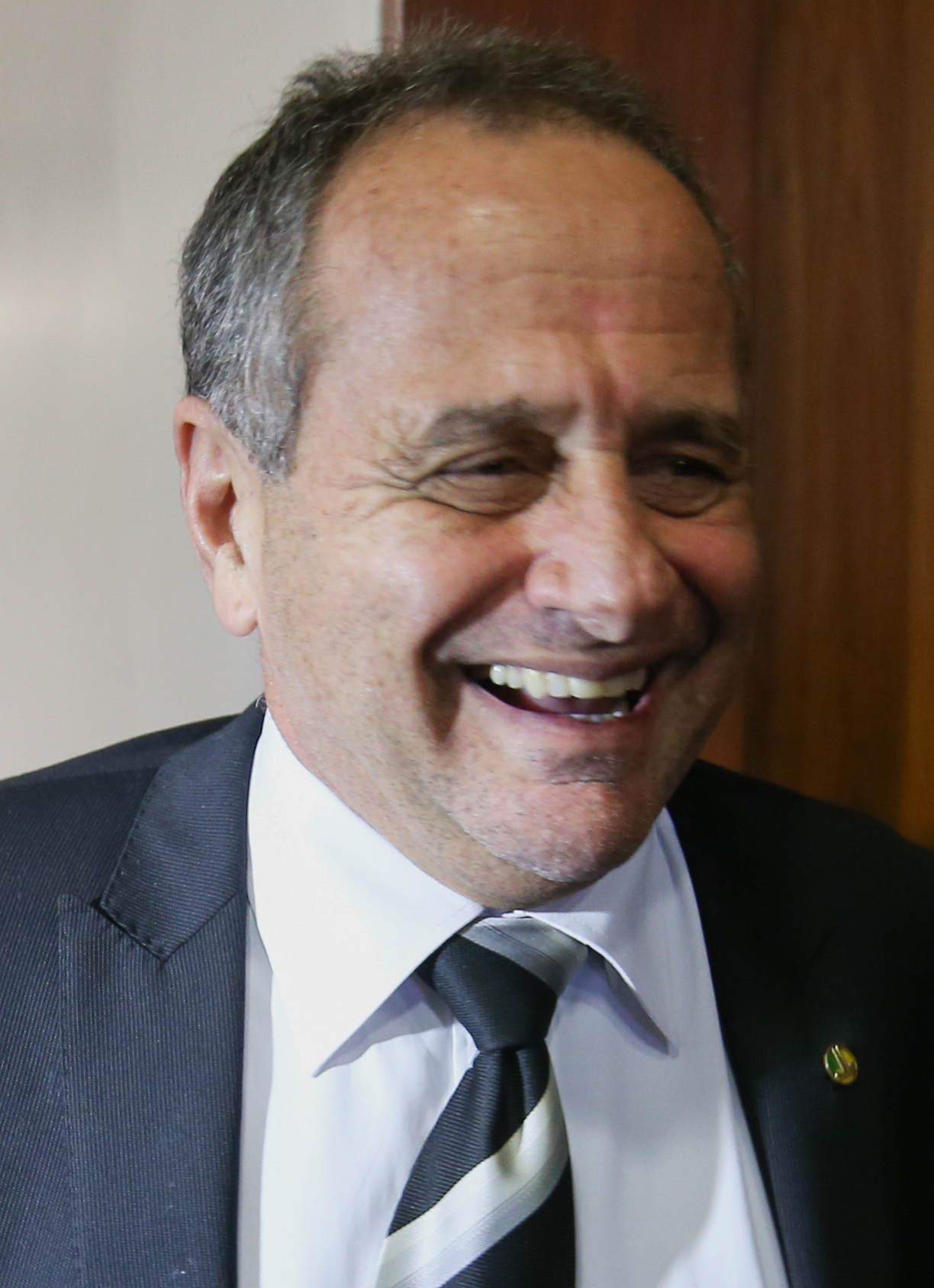
- Manato in July 2016

Federal Deputy for Espírito Santo
- In office 1 January 2001 – 31 January 2019

Secretary of service for Serra
- In office 1 January 2001 – 31 December 2003

Personal details
- Born: 7 August 1957 (age 69) Alegre, Espírito Santo, Brazil
- Party: REP (2026–present)
- Other political affiliations: PL (2022–2026); PSL (2018–2020); SD (2013–2018); PDT (2001–2013); PSDB (1994–2001)

Carlos Humberto Manato (born 7 August 1957) is a Brazilian politician. He has spent his political career representing Espírito Santo, having served as federal deputy representative from 2001 to 2019.

== Personal life ==
Manato is the son of Hélio José Mannato and Thereza Buteri Mannato, and is married to Soraya de Souza Mannato. Manato is a member of the Pentecostal church Igreja Cristã Maranata.

== Political career ==
Manato voted in favor of the impeachment motion of then-president Dilma Rousseff. Manato voted in favor of tax reforms but against the 2017 Brazilian labor reform, and would vote in favor of opening a corruption investigation into Rousseff's successor Michel Temer.

There was some controversy over the funding Manato and several other elected deputies had received from the Maranata church, in exchange with the government not investigating the church's financial activities.

In 2018 Manato joined the Social Liberal Party and allied himself with then presidential candidate Jair Bolsonaro. The same year Manato contested the Espírito Santo gubernatorial election, where he came in third with 525,973 votes or 27.26% of the valid ballots.
