= Jacqueline Moraes =

Brazilian politician

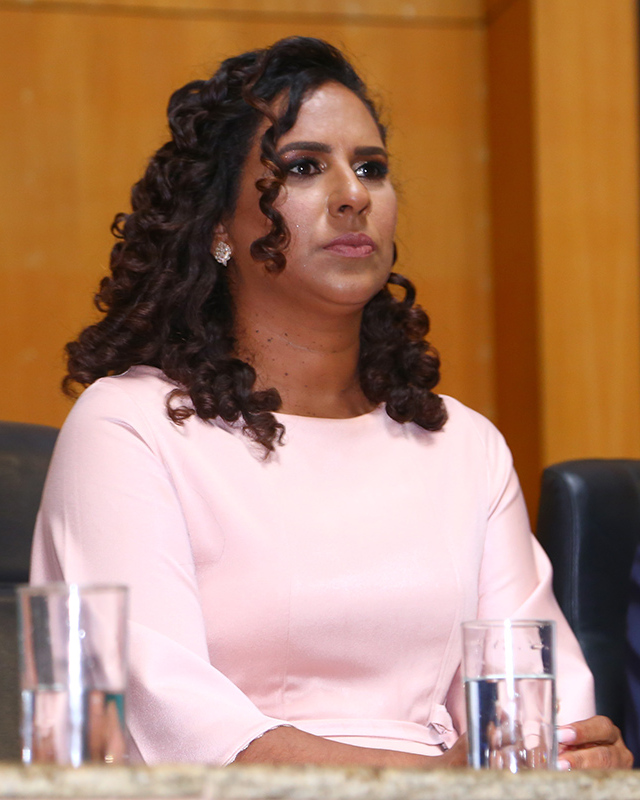
- Jacqueline Moraes in 2019.

Secretary of Policies for Women of Espírito Santo
- Incumbent
- Assumed office 1 January 2023
- Governor: Renato Casagrande

Vice-governor of Espírito Santo
- In office 1 January 2019 – 1 January 2023
- Preceded by: César Colnago
- Succeeded by: Ricardo Ferraço

Councilwoman of Cariacica
- In office 1 January 2013 – 1 January 2017

Personal details
- Born: Jacqueline Moraes da Silva; 16 August 1975 (age 51) Duque de Caxias, Rio de Janeiro, Brazil
- Party: PTB (2000–2004); PMN (2004–2007); PP (2007–2011); PSD (2011–2017); PSB (2017–present)
- Occupation: Micro-entrepreneur, politician

Jacqueline Moraes da Silva (born 16 August 1975) is a Brazilian micro-entrepreneur and politician, affiliated with the Brazilian Socialist Party (PSB). She became the first Black person and first woman to be elected as the vice-governor of the state of Espírito Santo. She first won the election for the position in 2018, with Renato Casagrande as governor. She served from 2018 to 2022.

== Biography ==
Moraes was born on 16 August 1975, in Duque de Caxias, in the Baixada Fluminense region of Rio de Janeiro state. She moved to Espírito Santo at 12 years old and lived in Cariacica. She is married to former hawker and ex-councilor in the city of Cariacica, Adilson Avelina, with whom she has three children and one grandchild. She worked as a street vendor in the centre of Vitória, where she had at one point her products seized due to the profession being considered informal work.

Engaged in social activism, she presided over the Association of Street Vendors of the State of Espírito Santo, and two times with the Bairro Operário Neighborhood Association in Cariacica. In 2012, she was elected as a councilwoman in Cariacica for the Social Democratic Party (PSD). She won her first election with 2,562 votes.

During the 2018 elections, she became a pre-candidate for federal deputy when she was invited to run for statewide election as the vice-governor with ex-governor Renato Casagrande (PSB). They were elected in the first round with 55.49% of the vote. She became the first Black person and first woman to be elected to the position.

To chronicle her political career, she published "Origens", where she discusses her activism in favor of street vendors and her career as a community leader that led her to running for public office.

== Bibliography ==
- Origens: como a periferia me levou para a política e me fez vice-governadora (1440.Press)

== Electoral history ==
Year	Election	Office	Coalition	Party	Ticket	Votes	%	Result
2012	Cariacica municipal elections	Councilwoman	—	PSD	—	2,562	1.45%	Won
2018	Espírito Santo state elections	Vice-governor	More Equal Espírito Santo (PSB, PHS, PROS, PV, PSC, AVANTE, PTC, PPS, PSDB, PP, PCdoB, DEM, PDT PPL, DC, SD, PRP, PSD)	PSB	Renato Casagrande (PSB)	1,072,224	55.49%	Won
