= Renato Casagrande =

Brazilian politician

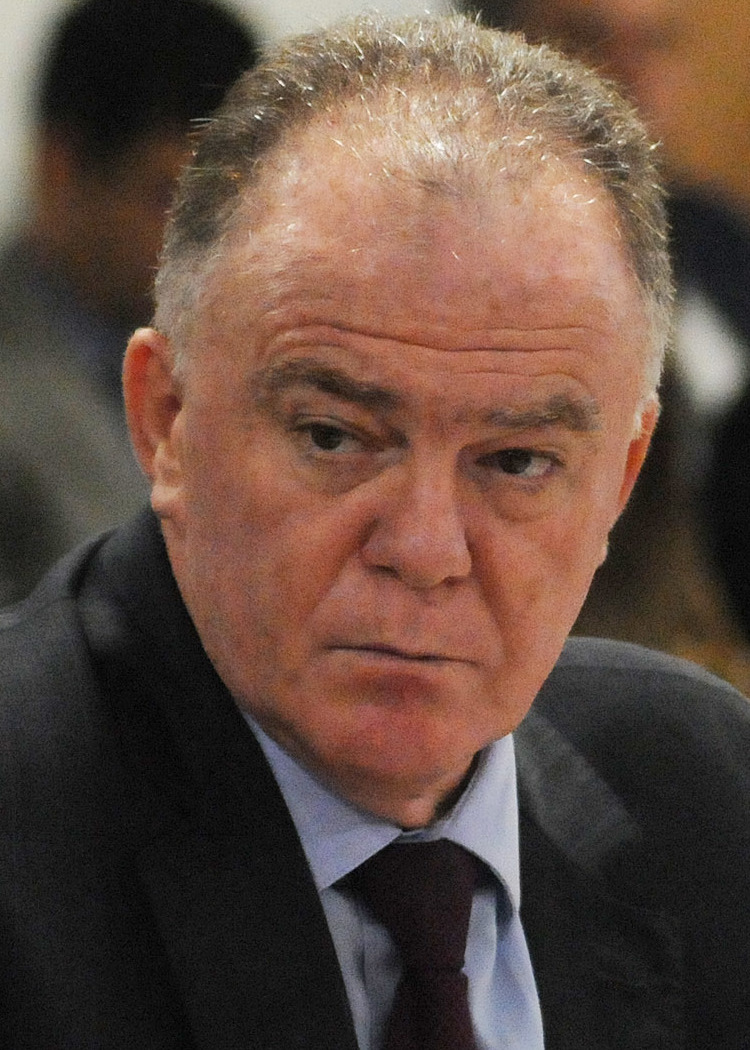

Senator-elect for Espírito Santo
- Assuming office 1 February 2027

Governor of Espírito Santo
- In office 1 January 2019 – 2 April 2026
- Vice Governor: Jacqueline Moraes (2019–2023); Ricardo Ferraço (2023–2026)
- Preceded by: Paulo Hartung
- Succeeded by: Ricardo Ferraço
- In office 1 January 2011 – 1 January 2015
- Preceded by: Paulo Hartung
- Succeeded by: Paulo Hartung

Personal details
- Born: 3 December 1960 (age 65) Castelo, Espírito Santo, Brazil
- Party: PSB (1987–present)
- Other political affiliations: PMDB (1982–1987); PCdoB (1980–1982)
- Spouse: Maria Virgínia Moça Casagrande
- Education: Universidade Federal de Viçosa
- Occupation: Lawyer

José Renato Casagrande is the Governor of the Brazilian state of Espírito Santo. He was initially governor from 1 January 2011, until 1 January 2015. Then, he was elected to a new term as governor in 2018 and was reelected to a third term in 2022.

== Biography ==
Forester and lawyer, Casagrande was born in Castelo, Espírito Santo and is the son of Augusto Casagrande and Anna Venturim Casagrande. Casagrande is Italian Brazilian. Casagrande is married to Maria Virgínia, with whom he has two children.

In 2020 Casagrande tested positive for COVID-19 along with his wife and mother.

Political offices
Preceded by Paulo Hartung	Governor of Espírito Santo; 2011–2015	Succeeded by Paulo Hartung
Preceded by Paulo Hartung	Governor of Espírito Santo; 2019–2026	Succeeded by Ricardo Ferraço
