= Paulo Hartung =

Brazilian politician (born 1957)

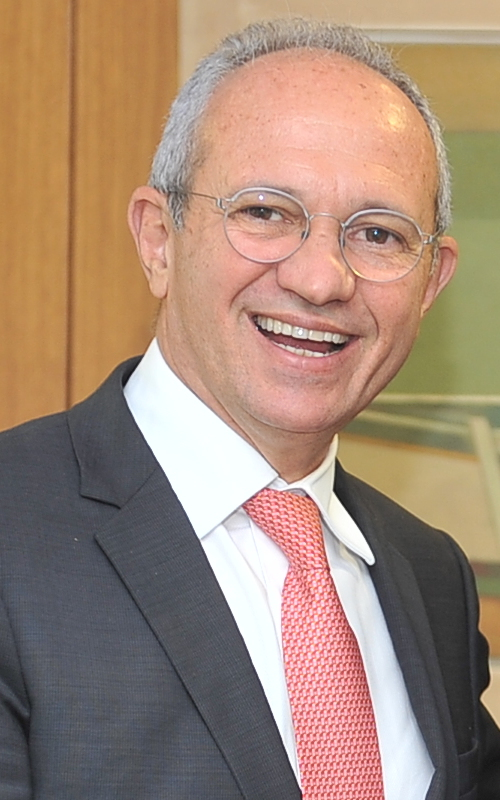

46th and 48th Governor of Espírito Santo
- In office January 1, 2015 – January 1, 2019
- Preceded by: Renato Casagrande
- Succeeded by: Renato Casagrande
- In office January 1, 2003 – December 31, 2010
- Preceded by: José Ignácio Ferreira
- Succeeded by: Renato Casagrande

Member of the Federal Senate from Espírito Santo
- In office 1999–2001

Mayor of Vitória
- In office January 1, 1993 – January 1, 1997
- Preceded by: Vitor Buaiz
- Succeeded by: Luiz Paulo Vellozo Lucas

Member of the Chamber of Deputies from Espírito Santo
- In office 1991–1993

Member of the Legislative Assembly of Espírito Santo
- In office 1983–1991

Personal details
- Born: April 21, 1957 (age 69) Guaçuí, Espírito Santo, Brazil
- Party: PSD (2025–present)
- Other political affiliations: PMDB/MDB (1982–1987; 2005–2018); PSDB (1988–1999); PPS (1999–2001); PSB (2001–2005)
- Education: Universidade Federal do Espírito Santo
- Occupation: Economist
- Website: Campaign Website

Paulo Cesar Hartung Gomes (born April 21, 1957) is a Brazilian politician and was the Governor of the Brazilian state of Espírito Santo from 2003 until 2010. He served as Governor of Espírito Santo for a third, nonconsecutive term from January 1, 2015, to January 1, 2019.

== Biography ==
Paulo Hartung began his political career in the student movement, in a troubled period of Brazilian history, which were the last years of the military regime in 1964, which started with the deposition of João Goulart. Linked to the Brazilian Communist Party (PCB) at the time of the military dictatorship, Hartung was elected the first president of the DCE (the Students' Central Directory) when he was a student of UFES.

In 1979, he actively participated in the process that restructured the National Union of Students, having served as organizer of Espirito Santo bench and mobilizing delegates across the country to the entity's reconstruction congress representing all Brazilian students, held in Salvador, capital the state of Bahia.

Hartung joined the Brazilian Democratic Movement Party in 1982, and therefore initiated its political party trajectory. At 25-year-old, he was elected state representative to a four-year term (1983–1987), standing out as the youngest parliamentarian of the Legislative Assembly of the Espírito Santo.

On expiry of the mandate, he was re-elected in 1986 for a new four-year term (1987–1990) and participated in drafting the State Constitution. In his passage through the Assembly he was concerned with the defense of the civil service, and deal with fundamental issues for society, such as the environment, health, education, public transportation, among others.

In 1990, Hartung won the mandate of Congressman (1991–1995), with the highest vote in the City of Vitória, the state capital. His outstanding performance led to assume the post of deputy leader of the Party of Brazilian Social Democracy in the House, whose leadership was exercised by José Serra, then federal deputy for São Paulo, most important federal unit of the Brazilian Republic.

In 1992, municipal elections were held across the country and in them Paulo Hartung launched his candidacy and was elected Mayor of Vitória (1993-1997). In early 1997, he handed over his charge to his elected successor, Luiz Paulo Vellozo Lucas, also of the PSDB, and participated in the United States at the invitation of the Embassy of that country, the intensive program on Public Administration and Political System in the United States.

After returning to Brazil, Paulo Hartung took at the invitation of President Fernando Henrique Cardoso, his co-religionist of party, the Board of Regional Development and the BNDES (National Bank for Economic and Social Development). In the first year of management, folder invested 1.4 billion dollars in social projects.

In 1998, at the age of 41, Paulo Hartung was elected to the Federal Senate, receiving approximately 780,000 votes, reportedly the highest number received by a political candidate in Espírito Santo at the time. Before his election, he had held positions in the executive and legislative branches of government at the municipal, state, and federal levels.

In 2002, affiliated to the Brazilian Socialist Party, Hartung was elected in the first round, state governor with 820,000 votes cast, representing 54% of the votes. He took office on January 1, 2003, to receive his predecessor, Jose Ignacio Ferreira, a free credit status among federal and global financial bodies, heavily in debt, with serious problems in the administrative machine and unable to investments necessary in social areas and the physical structure (construction of schools and rehabilitation of roads, for example). In the first term at the head of the State Executive, he managed to somehow recover the finances and also, to some extent, the tarnished image of Espírito Santo at the federal level.

== See also ==
- List of mayors of Vitória, Espírito Santo
