= Rose de Freitas =

Brazilian politician and journalist

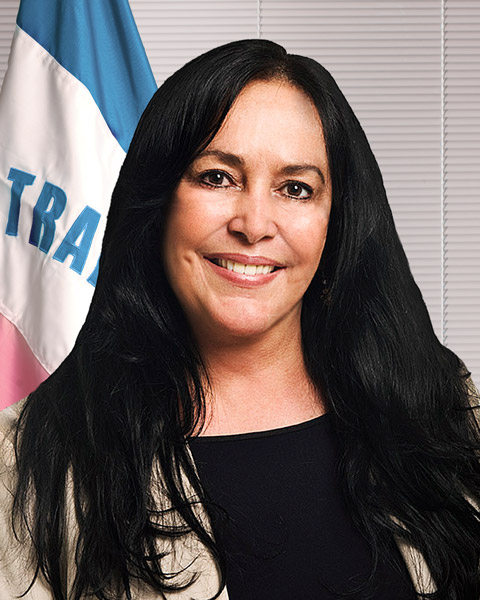

Senator for Espírito Santo
- In office February 1, 2015 – February 1, 2023

Member of the Chamber of Deputies
- In office February 1, 2003 – February 1, 2015
- Constituency: Espírito Santo
- In office February 1, 1987 – February 1, 1995
- Constituency: Espírito Santo

Personal details
- Born: January 23, 1949 (age 77) Caratinga, Minas Gerais, Brazil
- Party: MDB (2021–present; 2003–18, 1970–90)
- Other party: PSDB (1990–2003); PODE (2018–21)
- Profession: Journalist

Rose de Freitas (born January 23, 1949) is a Brazilian politician and journalist. She has represented Espírito Santo in the Federal Senate from 2015 to 2023. Previously, she was a Deputy from Espírito Santo from 2003 to 2015. She is a member of the Brazilian Democratic Movement (MDB).
