= Magno Malta =

Brazilian politician (born 1957)

- Official portrait

Senator for Espírito Santo
- Incumbent
- Assumed office 1 February 2023
- In office 1 February 2003 – 1 February 2019

Member of the Chamber of Deputies
- In office 1 February 1999 – 1 February 2003
- Constituency: Espírito Santo

State Deputy of Espírito Santo
- In office 1 February 1995 – 1 February 1999

Personal details
- Born: 16 October 1957 (age 68) Macarani, Bahia, Brazil
- Party: PL (2006–present)
- Other political affiliations: PTB (1993–95); PMDB (1995–2001); PST (2001); PL (2001–06)
- Spouse: Lauriete Rodrigues (m. 2013; div. 2019)
- Profession: Singer, pastor
- Magno Malta's voice Recorded in 11 November 2005

Magno Malta (born October 16, 1957) is a Brazilian evangelical pastor, religious singer, and politician. He has represented Espírito Santo in the Federal Senate from 2003 to 2020 and was re-elected for a separate term that began in 2023. He is a member of the Liberal Party and is a staunch ally of former president Jair Bolsonaro.

Previously he was city councillor in Cachoeiro de Itapemirim, serving as a member of PTB, a State Deputy from Espírito Santo from 1995 to 2003, serving as a member of the MDB, and a Federal Deputy from Espírito Santo from 1999 to 2003, serving as a member of the short-lived Social Labor Party before it merged with the Liberal Party. Since 2007, he has been involved in many scandals including embezzlement, nepotism, bribing and emission of fake bill of goods. Some of these accusations are believed to be the cause of his loss in the 2018 Senate election, placing third.
