= Legislative Assembly of Espírito Santo =

Coordinates: 20.3119°S 40.2900°W

Legislative Assembly of Espírito Santo Assembleia Legislativa do Espírito Santo
- 20th

Type
- Type: Unicameral

Leadership
- President: Marcelo Santos since February 1, 2023
- Government Leader: Dary Pagung, PSB

Structure
- Seats: 30 deputies
- Political groups: Government (18) PSB (3) UNIÃO (3) PP (3) Podemos (2) PSDB (2) PT (2) PSD (2) PDT (1) Independent (3) PSOL (1) REDE (1) DC (1) Opposition (9) Republicans (5) PL (3) PRD (1)

Elections
- Voting system: Open list proportional representation
- Last election: 2 October 2022
- Next election: 2026

Meeting place
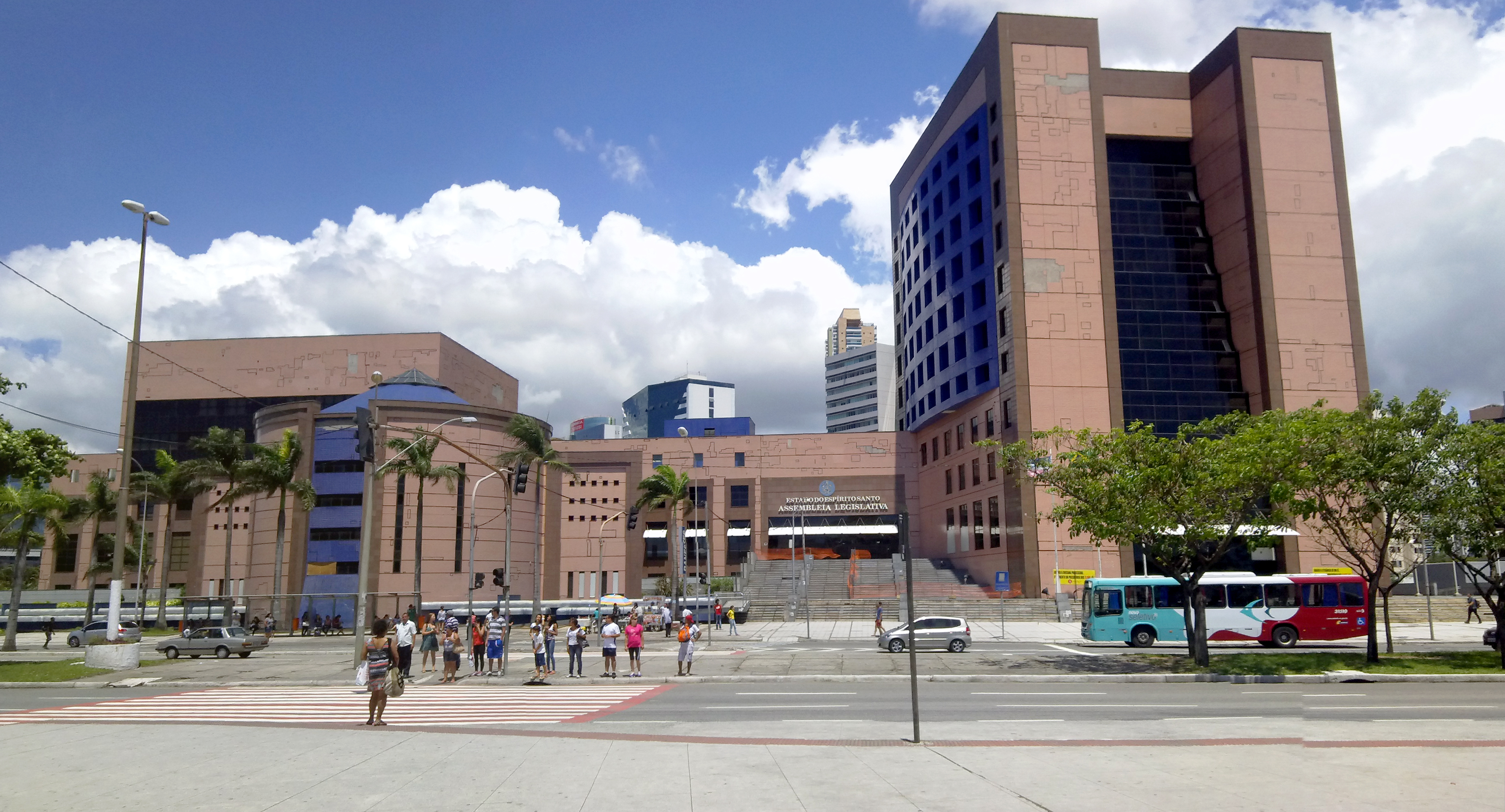
- Vitória, Espírito Santo

Website
- www.al.es.gov.br

The Legislative Assembly of Espírito Santo (Portuguese: Assembleia Legislativa do Espírito Santo) is the unicameral legislature of the state of Espírito Santo in Brazil. It has 30 state deputies elected by proportional representation. It is located in the city of Vitória.
