= 2026 Brazilian gubernatorial elections =

- 4 October 2026 (1st round); 25 October 2026 (2nd round)
Party	PL	PSD	PT
Governors	6	5	4
Governorship change	▲4	▲3	Steady
Party	Republicanos	PP	PSDB
Governors	4	3	2
Governorship change	▲2	▲1	▼1
Party	MDB	PODE
Governors	1	1
Governorship change	▼2	▲1

Gubernatorial elections were held in Brazil on 4 October 2026 as part of the nationwide general elections to elect tickets with state governors and their vice governors (as well as the governor of the Federal District and their vice governor). A second round was held on 25 October 2026 for states where no candidate was able to secure more than half of the votes in the first round.

== Overview ==
2026 Brazilian gubernatorial elections
State	Outgoing Governor		Winner		%	Leading opponent		%
State	Name	Party	Name	Party	%	Name	Party	%
AC	Mailza Gomes	PP	Mailza Gomes; Reelected in the 2nd round	PP	66.21%	Alan Rick	UNIÃO	33.79%
AL	Paulo Dantas	MDB	João Henrique Caldas; Elected in the 1st round	PSDB	52.20%	Renan Filho	MDB	47.37%
AP	Clécio Luís	UNIÃO	Antônio Furlan; Elected in the 1st round	PSD	62.75%	Clécio Luís	UNIÃO	36.97%
AM	Roberto Cidade	UNIÃO	Omar Aziz; Elected in the 2nd round	PSD	61.42%	Maria do Carmo	PL	38.58%
BA	Jerônimo Rodrigues	PT	Jerônimo Rodrigues; Reelected in the 1st round	PT	55.80%	ACM Neto	UNIÃO	43.72%
CE	Elmano de Freitas	PT	Elmano de Freitas; Reelected in the 2nd round	PT	53.19%	Ciro Gomes	PSDB	46.22%
ES	Ricardo Ferraço	MDB	Lorenzo Pazolini; Elected in the 2nd round	Republicanos	52.17%	Ricardo Ferraço	MDB	47.83%
DF	Celina Leão	PP	Celina Leão; Reelected in the 2nd round	PP	57.18%	Leandro Grass	PT	42.82%
GO	Daniel Vilela	MDB	Daniel Vilela; Reelected in the 1st round	MDB	59.17%	Wilder Morais	PL	21.96%
MA	Carlos Brandão	MDB	Eduardo Braide; Elected in the 1st round	PSD	54.02%	Orleans Brandão	MDB	34.76%
MT	Otaviano Pivetta	Republicanos	Otaviano Pivetta; Reelected in the 1st round	Republicanos	60.77%	Wellington Fagundes	PL	23.19%
MS	Eduardo Riedel	PP	Eduardo Riedel; Reelected in the 1st round	PP	67.07%	Fábio Trad	PT	23.68%
MG	Mateus Simões	PSD	Cleitinho Azevedo; Elected in the 1st round	Republicanos	55.40%	Patrus Ananias	PT	26.34%
PR	Ratinho Júnior	PSD	Sergio Moro; Elected in the 1st round	PL	50.10%	Sandro Alex	PSD	25.37%
PB	Lucas Ribeiro	PP	Lucas Ribeiro; Reelected in the 1st round	PP	64.30%	Efraim Filho	PL	24.18%
PA	Hana Ghassan	MDB	Daniel Santos; Elected in the 1st round	PODE	51.36%	Hana Ghassan	MDB	46.53%
PE	Raquel Lyra	PSD	Raquel Lyra; Reelected in the 2nd round	PSD	53.27%	João Campos	PSB	44.82%
PI	Rafael Fonteles	PT	Rafael Fonteles; Reelected in the 1st round	PT	70.90%	Joel Rodrigues	PP	27.54%
RJ	Ricardo Couto	No Party	Douglas Ruas; Elected in the 1st round	PL	50.88%	Eduardo Paes	PSD	44.16%
RN	Fátima Bezerra	PT	Cadu Xavier; Elected in the 2nd round	PT	50.77%	Allyson Bezerra	UNIÃO	49.23%
RS	Eduardo Leite	PSD	Luciano Zucco; Elected in the 1st round	PL	58.05%	Juliana Brizola	PDT	31.65%
RO	Marcos Rocha	UNIÃO	Marcos Rogério; Elected in the 1st round	PL	56.86%	Adaílton Fúria	PSD	20.06%
RR	Francisco Sampaio	Republicanos	Arthur Henrique; Elected in the 1st round	PL	69.13%	Francisco Sampaio	Republicanos	29.25%
SC	Jorginho Mello	PL	Jorginho Mello; Reelected in the 1st round	PL	68.98%	Gelson Merisio	PSB	15.66%
SP	Tarcísio de Freitas	Republicanos	Tarcísio de Freitas; Reelected in the 1st round	Republicanos	62.65%	Fernando Haddad	PT	36.42%
SE	Fábio Mitidieri	PSD	Fábio Mitidieri; Relected in the 1st round	PSD	59.27%	Valmir de Francisquinho	Republicanos	37.48%
TO	Wanderlei Barbosa	REP	Vicentinho Júnior; Elected in the 2nd round	PSDB	64.52	Dorinha Rezende	UNIÃO	35.48%

== North ==
=== Acre ===
Candidate	Running mate	Party	First round		Second round	
Candidate	Running mate	Party	Votes	%	Votes	%
Mailza Gomes (incumbent)	Jéssica Sales (MDB)	Progressistas	218,760	49.76	272,635	66.21
Alan Rick	Ricardo Leite	Republicans	141,859	32.27	139,108	33.79
Tião Bocalom	Sargento Adonis	Brazilian Social Democracy Party	44,946	10.22		
Thor Dantas	Socorro Rodrigues (Podemos)	Brazilian Socialist Party	32,963	7.50		
Eudo Raffael	Poeta Cesinha	Brazilian Communist Party	715	0.16		
Dr. Luisinho	Daniela Paiva	Agir	404	0.09		
Total			439,647	100.00	411,743	100.00
Valid votes			439,647	90.10	411,743	90.83
Invalid votes			39,398	8.07	29,612	6.53
Blank votes			8,926	1.83	11,979	2.64
Total votes			487,971	100.00	453,334	100.00
Registered voters/turnout			613,316	79.56	613,316	73.92
Source: Superior Electoral Court

=== Amapá ===
Candidate	Running mate	Party	Votes	%
Antônio Furlan	Luciana Gurgel (PL)	Social Democratic Party	281,595	62.75
Clécio Luís (incumbent)	Teles Junior (PDT)	Brazil Union	165,900	36.97
Carlos Cley	Ana Paula Pinheiro	United Socialist Workers' Party	561	0.13
Marcos Reátegui	Cristina Araujo	Christian Democracy	376	0.08
Jairo Palheta	Iracelia Barbosa	Workers' Cause Party	315	0.07
Total			448,747	100.00
Valid votes			448,747	94.27
Invalid votes			24,308	5.11
Blank votes			2,964	0.62
Total votes			476,019	100.00
Registered voters/turnout			576,359	82.59
Source: Superior Electoral Court

=== Amazonas ===
Candidate	Running mate	Party	First round		Second round	
Candidate	Running mate	Party	Votes	%	Votes	%
Omar Aziz	Alessandra Campelo	Social Democratic Party	841,846	40.63	1,273,975	61.42
Maria do Carmo Seffair	Coronel Aníbal	Liberal Party	507,335	24.49	800,328	38.58
Roberto Cidade	Serafim Corrêa (PSB)	Brazil Union	453,896	21.91		
David Almeida	Shádia Fraxe	Avante	218,490	10.54		
Cabo Daciolo	Igor Bezerra	National Mobilization	36,176	1.75		
Isael Munduruku	Léo Balbi (PSOL)	Sustainability Network	11,459	0.55		
Gilberto Vasconcelos	Juliana Frota	United Socialist Workers' Party	2,783	0.13		
Total			2,071,985	100.00	2,074,303	100.00
Valid votes			2,071,985	92.82	2,074,303	94.72
Invalid votes			109,946	4.93	75,947	3.47
Blank votes			50,340	2.26	39,610	1.81
Total votes			2,232,271	100.00	2,189,860	100.00
Registered voters/turnout			2,796,053	79.84	2,796,053	78.32
Source: Superior Electoral Court

=== Rondônia ===
Candidate	Running mate	Party	Votes	%
Marcos Rogério	Rodrigo Camargo (PODE)	Liberal Party	537,370	56.86
Adaílton Fúria	Everton Leoni	Social Democratic Party	189,547	20.06
Hildon Chaves	Cirone Deiró	Brazil Union	134,355	14.22
Expedito Netto	Luiz Carlos Teodoro (PSOL)	Workers' Party	72,851	7.71
Pedro Abib	Mauro Pereira	Brazilian Democratic Movement	6,591	0.70
Samuel Costa (withdrew)	Sargento Machado (withdrew)	United Socialist Workers' Party	4,344	0.46
Total			945,058	100.00
Valid votes			945,058	95.43
Invalid votes			21,648	2.19
Blank votes			23,607	2.38
Total votes			990,313	100.00
Registered voters/turnout			1,265,008	78.29
Source: Superior Electoral Court

=== Roraima ===
Candidate	Running mate	Party	Votes	%
Arthur Henrique	Haroldo Cathedral (NOVO)	Liberal Party	220,809	69.13
Francisco Sampaio (incumbent)	Shéridan Oliveira (PODE)	Republicanos	93,434	29.25
Rosi Aires	Lúcia Patamona	Socialism and Liberty Party	4,880	1.53
Farah Mesquisa	Natália Cipriano (Avante)	Solidariedade	213	0.07
Clébio Genuíno	Jota Rodrigues	Workers' Cause Party	77	0.02
Total			319,413	100.00
Valid votes			319,413	96.22
Invalid votes			8,869	2.67
Blank votes			3,677	1.11
Total votes			331,959	100.00
Registered voters/turnout			400,603	82.86

=== Pará ===
Candidate	Running mate	Party	Votes	%
Daniel Santos	Ellayne D'Almeida (PL)	Podemos	2,345,721	51.36
Hana Ghassan (incumbent)	Dirceu Ten Caten (PT)	Brazilian Democratic Movement	2,125,084	46.53
Araceli Pereira	Fátima Santana	Socialism and Liberty Party	85,857	1.88
Gal Leite	Karen Suellen	Popular Unity	5,503	0.12
Well Macedo	Ana Lúcia Souza	United Socialist Workers' Party	2,676	0.06
Ruth Reis	Márcia Carvalho	Democrata	1,987	0.04
Total			4,566,828	100.00
Valid votes			4,566,828	90.20
Invalid votes			389,825	7.70
Blank votes			106,097	2.10
Total votes			5,062,750	100.00
Registered voters/turnout			6,258,162	80.90

=== Tocantins ===
Candidate	Running mate	Party	First round		Second round	
Candidate	Running mate	Party	Votes	%	Votes	%
Vicentinho Júnior	Amélio Cayres (MDB)	Brazilian Social Democracy Party	372,848	43.94	562,083	64.52
Dorinha Rezende	Atos Gomes (Republicanos)	Brazil Union	386,260	45.52	309,076	35.48
Laurez Moreira	Silva Neto	Social Democratic Party	69,967	8.24		
Ataides de Oliveira	Rosileia Carneiro	New Party	13,173	1.55		
Witer Naves	Lúcia Viana	Socialism and Liberty Party	5,109	0.60		
Ivaldo Pereira	Silvino Vitor	Christian Democracy	1,272	0.15		
Total			848,629	100.00	871,159	100.00
Valid votes			848,629	88.05	871,159	91.38
Invalid votes			88,096	9.14	61,903	6.49
Blank votes			27,085	2.81	20,323	2.13
Total votes			963,810	100.00	953,385	100.00
Registered voters/turnout			1,180,433	81.65	1,180,433	80.77

== Northeast ==
=== Alagoas ===
Candidate	Running mate	Party	Votes	%
João Henrique Caldas	Célia Rocha	Brazilian Social Democracy Party	892,484	52.20
Renan Filho	Yale Fernandes	Brazilian Democratic Movement	809,796	47.37
Lenilda Luna	Jardel Queiroz	Popular Unity	6,454	0.38
Márcio Jambo	Jaudinete Pontes	Democrata	880	0.05
Total			1,709,614	100.00
Valid votes			1,709,614	88.31
Invalid votes			169,903	8.78
Blank votes			56,303	2.91
Total votes			1,935,820	100.00
Registered voters/turnout			2,439,190	79.36

=== Bahia ===
Candidate	Running mate	Party	Votes	%
Jerônimo Rodrigues (incumbent)	Geraldo Júnior	Workers' Party	4,626,509	55.80
ACM Neto	Zenildo Santana (PP)	Brazil Union	3,625,227	43.72
Ronaldo Mansur	Meire Reis	Socialism and Liberty Party	27,243	0.33
Aroldo Félix	Marília Santana	Popular Unity	5,238	0.06
Marina Bona	José Ricardo	Workers' Cause Party	4,028	0.05
Ariel Capistrano	José Augusto	Christian Democracy	2,845	0.03
Total			8,291,090	100.00
Valid votes			8,291,090	91.65
Invalid votes			521,993	5.77
Blank votes			233,096	2.58
Total votes			9,046,179	100.00
Registered voters/turnout			11,304,314	80.02

=== Ceará ===
Candidate	Running mate	Party	Votes	%
Elmano de Freitas (incumbent)	Gabriella Aguiar (PSD)	Workers' Party	2,875,573	53.19
Ciro Gomes	Roberto Cláudio (UNIÃO)	Brazilian Social Democracy Party	2,498,891	46.22
Huggo Anastácio	Felipe Moreira	Mission Party	17,219	0.32
Vera Lúcia	Amilton Gomes	New Party	5,701	0.11
Serley Leal	Catherine Teles	Popular Unity	4,344	0.08
Zé Batista	Ivonete Felix	United Socialist Workers' Party	2,161	0.04
Danilo Soares	Eryck Veloso	Democrata	1,743	0.03
Ieri Braga	Laerte Melo	Workers' Cause Party	463	0.01
Total			5,406,095	100.00
Valid votes			5,406,095	91.54
Invalid votes			329,111	5.57
Blank votes			170,316	2.88
Total votes			5,905,522	100.00
Registered voters/turnout			6,991,044	84.47

=== Maranhão ===
Candidate	Running mate	Party	Votes	%
Eduardo Braide	Elaine Carneiro	Social Democratic Party	2,104,122	54.02
Orleans Brandão	Edivaldo Holanda Júnior (Republicanos)	Brazilian Democratic Movement	1,354,044	34.76
Felipe Camarão	Ricardo Rodrigues	Workers' Party	374,039	9.60
Roberto Rocha	Josias Cardoso	Brazilian Labour Renewal Party	48,924	1.26
André Luís	Cadu Aguiar	Mission Party	7,905	0.20
Saulo Arcangeli	Luciana Costa	United Socialist Workers' Party	4,693	0.12
Reginaldo Lima	Felix Lima e Silva	Brazilian Communist Party	1,096	0.03
Dimas Cassimiro	Charlieth Viana	Workers' Cause Party	257	0.01
Total			3,895,080	100.00
Valid votes			3,895,080	93.67
Invalid votes			169,646	4.08
Blank votes			93,669	2.25
Total votes			4,158,395	100.00
Registered voters/turnout			5,180,851	80.26

=== Paraíba ===
Candidate	Running mate	Party	Votes	%
Lucas Ribeiro	Lígia Feliciano (UNIÃO)	Progressistas	1,470,252	64.30
Efraim Filho	Nayana Pontes	Liberal Party	552,836	24.18
Cícero Lucena	Diego Cunha Lima (PSD)	Brazilian Democratic Movement	252,884	11.06
Yuri Ezequiel	Carminha Lourenço	Popular Unity	8,272	0.36
Camilo Duarte	Marcos Lima	Workers' Cause Party	2,378	0.10
Total			2,286,622	100.00
Valid votes			2,286,622	85.39
Invalid votes			263,466	9.84
Blank votes			127,816	4.77
Total votes			2,677,904	100.00
Registered voters/turnout			3,241,966	82.60

=== Pernambuco ===
Candidate	Running mate	Party	Votes	%
Raquel Lyra (incumbent)	Priscila Krause	Social Democratic Party	2,805,438	53.27
João Campos	Carlos Costa (Republicanos)	Brazilian Socialist Party	2,360,469	44.82
Ivan Moraes	Alice Gabino (REDE)	Socialism and Liberty Party	77,699	1.48
Renan Hallais	Lucas Xavier	Mission Party	18,340	0.35
Camila Falcão	Marcelo Pessoa	Popular Unity	3,495	0.07
Guilherme Fonseca	Valéria Félix	United Socialist Workers' Party	987	0.02
Victor Assis	Roberta Rita	Workers' Cause Party	424	0.01
Total			5,266,852	100.00
Valid votes			5,266,852	89.19
Invalid votes			481,903	8.16
Blank votes			156,482	2.65
Total votes			5,905,237	100.00
Registered voters/turnout			7,216,989	81.82

=== Piauí ===
Candidate	Running mate	Party	Votes	%
Rafael Fonteles (incumbent)	Washington Bandeira	Workers' Party	1,436,697	70.90
Joel Rodrigues	Jeová Alencar	Progressistas	557,972	27.54
Gisvaldo da Silva	Edilene Pinho	Socialism and Liberty Party	10,002	0.49
Lúcia Santos	Paulo Eudes	Brazilian Social Democracy Party	9,611	0.47
Elizeu Aguiar	Ismar Marques	New Party	5,125	0.25
Geraldo Carvalho	Gervásio Santos	United Socialist Workers' Party	1,858	0.09
Santiago Belizário	Thays Dias	Popular Unity	1,777	0.09
Lourdes Melo	Zeferino da Silva	Workers' Cause Party	1,296	0.06
Francisco Jurity	Pedro Pereira	Christian Democracy	1,102	0.05
Ravenna Azevedo	João Ricardo	Democrata	819	0.04
Total			2,026,259	100.00
Valid votes			2,026,259	90.48
Invalid votes			136,522	6.10
Blank votes			76,589	3.42
Total votes			2,239,370	100.00
Registered voters/turnout			2,703,064	82.85

=== Rio Grande do Norte ===
Candidate	Running mate	Party	First round		Second round	
Candidate	Running mate	Party	Votes	%	Votes	%
Cadu Xavier	Larissa Rosado (PSB)	Workers' Party	718,300	36.16	1,073,024	50.77
Allyson Bezerra	Hermano Morais (MDB)	Brazil Union	733,809	36.94	1,040,399	49.23
Álvaro Dias	Anteomar Pereira	Liberal Party	530,580	26.71		
Arinalda Vasconcelos	Francisco Dias	Popular Unity	1,466	0.07		
Dário Barbosa	Fernanda Soares	United Socialist Workers' Party	1,388	0.07		
Gladyer Linhares	Júlio Cesar Neves	Christian Democracy	464	0.02		
Rodrigo Vieira (withdrawn)	Socorro Batista	Agir	434	0.02		
Henrique Lyra	André Gustavo	Workers' Cause Party	227	0.01		
Total			1,986,668	100.00	2,113,423	100.00
Valid votes			1,986,668	91.65	2,113,423	94.79
Invalid votes			104,522	4.82	80,214	3.60
Blank votes			76,524	3.53	35,873	1.61
Total votes			2,167,714	100.00	2,229,510	100.00
Registered voters/turnout			2,656,207	81.61	2,656,207	83.94

=== Sergipe ===
Candidate	Running mate	Party	Votes	%
Fábio Mitidieri (incumbent)	Jeferson Andrade	Social Democratic Party	727,291	59.27
Valmir de Francisquinho	Priscila Felizola	Republicanos	459,908	37.48
Helton Monteiro	Izaltina Silva	Socialism and Liberty Party	37,081	3.02
Taty Cristina	Simeão Barbosa	Christian Democracy	2,728	0.22
Total			1,227,008	100.00
Valid votes			1,227,008	85.41
Invalid votes			154,847	10.78
Blank votes			54,754	3.81
Total votes			1,436,609	100.00
Registered voters/turnout			1,737,460	82.68

== Southeast ==
=== Espiríto Santo ===
Candidate	Running mate	Party	First round		Second round	
Candidate	Running mate	Party	Votes	%	Votes	%
Lorenzo Pazolini	Eliane Leal (PL)	Republicanos	1,048,633	49.65	1,151,818	52.17
Ricardo Ferraço	Camilo Neves (PP)	Brazilian Democratic Movement	719,397	34.06	1,056,119	47.83
Helder Salomão	Valdirene Bernardino	Workers' Party	323,483	15.32		
Breno Barcelos	Victor Oliveira	Mission Party	17,988	0.85		
Rafael Demuner	Dionary Sarmento	Popular Unity	2,670	0.13		
Total			2,112,171	100.00	2,207,937	100.00
Valid votes			2,112,171	89.93	2,207,937	91.78
Invalid votes			126,401	5.38	132,846	5.52
Blank votes			110,040	4.69	64,871	2.70
Total votes			2,348,612	100.00	2,405,654	100.00
Registered voters/turnout			2,987,584	78.61	2,987,584	80.52

=== Minas Gerais ===
Candidate	Running mate	Party	Votes	%
Cleitinho Azevedo	Luís Eduardo Falcão	Republicanos	6,321,590	55.40
Patrus Ananias	Jarbas Soares (PSB)	Workers' Party	3,006,088	26.34
Flávio Roscoe	Ellen Miziara	Liberal Party	795,193	6.97
Mateus Simões (incumbent)	Danilo de Castro (UNIÃO)	Social Democratic Party	530,292	4.65
Alexandre Kalil	Carlos Mosconi (PSDB)	Democratic Labour Party	403,466	3.54
Gabriel Azevedo	Maria Helena	Brazilian Democratic Movement	237,051	2.08
Ben Mendes	David Souza	Mission Party	80,308	0.70
Indira Xavier	Renato Campos	Popular Unity	20,662	0.18
Túlio Lopes	Warlen Nunes	Brazilian Communist Party	10,957	0.10
Rafael Duda	Diana de Cássia	United Socialist Workers' Party	4,764	0.04
Henrique Áreas	Estêvão Gomes	Workers' Cause Party	1,464	0.01
Total			11,411,835	100.00
Valid votes			11,411,835	90.38
Invalid votes			556,916	4.41
Blank votes			658,416	5.21
Total votes			12,627,167	100.00
Registered voters/turnout			16,361,188	77.18

=== São Paulo ===
Candidate	Running mate	Party	Votes	%
Tarcísio de Freitas (incumbent)	Felicio Ramuth (MDB)	Republicanos	14,491,874	62.65
Fernando Haddad	Márcio França (PSB)	Workers' Party	8,423,656	36.42
Vivian Mendes	Cris Damasio	Popular Unity	80,480	0.35
Vera Lúcia Salgado	Fabio Bosco	United Socialist Workers' Party	75,641	0.33
Carlos Machado	Felipe Queiroz	Brazilian Communist Party	58,862	0.25
Total			23,130,513	100.00
Valid votes			23,130,513	87.63
Invalid votes			1,915,481	7.26
Blank votes			1,348,262	5.11
Total votes			26,394,256	100.00
Registered voters/turnout			34,081,699	77.44

=== Rio de Janeiro ===
Candidate	Running mate	Party	Votes	%
Douglas Ruas	Fernanda Louback	Liberal Party	4,271,199	50.88
Eduardo Paes	Jane Reis (MDB)	Social Democratic Party	3,706,984	44.16
Anthony Garotinho	André Monteiro (Democrata)	Republicanos	274,411	
William Siri	Juliana Carvalho	Socialism and Liberty Party	235,347	2.80
João Jacques Busnello	Rafael Luz	Mission Party	84,889	1.01
André Marinho	Erigreyce Monteiro	New Party	45,359	0.54
Juliete Pantoja	Bia Martins	Popular Unity	33,430	0.40
Cyro Garcia	Perciliana Rodrigues	United Socialist Workers' Party	14,642	0.17
Luan Monteiro	Caetano Albuquerque	Workers' Cause Party	2,777	0.03
Total			8,394,627	100.00
Valid votes			8,394,627	85.26
Invalid votes			949,703	9.65
Blank votes			501,537	5.09
Total votes			9,845,867	100.00
Registered voters/turnout			12,842,517	76.67

== Center-West ==
=== Federal District ===
Candidate	Running mate	Party	First round		Second round	
Candidate	Running mate	Party	Votes	%	Votes	%
Celina Leão (incumbent)	Gustavo Rocha (Republicanos)	Progressistas	825,530	49.93	987,142	57.18
Leandro Grass	Dora Gomes (PV)	Workers' Party	569,930	34.47	739,130	42.82
Paula Belmonte	Everardo Ribeiro	Brazilian Social Democracy Party	140,765	8.51		
Kiko Caputo	Rafael Sampaio	New Party	72,148	4.36		
Ricardo Cappelli	Sofia Carvalho	Brazilian Socialist Party	36,828	2.23		
Samara Mineiro	Thaís Oliveira	Popular Unity	3,958	0.24		
Robson Raymundo	Antônio Guillen	United Socialist Workers' Party	1,640	0.10		
Elisson Freire	Sérgio Padro	Agir	1,172	0.07		
Rico Pinheiro	Cristiane Barros	Brazilian Labour Renewal Party	671	0.04		
Expedito Mendonça	Valmir Barbosa	Workers' Cause Party	595	0.04		
Total			1,653,237	100.00	1,726,272	100.00
Valid votes			1,653,237	90.94	1,726,272	93.09
Invalid votes			89,910	4.95	72,280	3.90
Blank votes			74,774	4.11	55,771	3.01
Total votes			1,817,921	100.00	1,854,323	100.00
Registered voters/turnout			2,243,988	81.01	2,243,988	82.64

=== Goiás ===
Candidate	Running mate	Party	Votes	%
Daniel Vilela (incumbent)	Luiz do Carmo (PSD)	Brazilian Democratic Movement	2,148,218	59.17
Wilder Morais	Ana Paula Rezende	Liberal Party	797,141	21.96
Luis Cesar Bueno	Carlos Mundim (PDT)	Workers' Party	356,692	9.82
Marconi Perillo	Jacqueline Zaiden	Brazilian Social Democracy Party	315,676	8.69
Luciana Amorim	Caymmi Henrique	Popular Unity	11,632	0.32
Danilo Pinheiro	Maria Joana	Workers' Cause Party	1,217	0.03
Total			3,630,576	100.00
Valid votes			3,630,576	91.53
Invalid votes			165,646	4.18
Blank votes			170,266	4.29
Total votes			3,966,488	100.00
Registered voters/turnout			5,074,870	78.16

=== Mato Grosso ===
Candidate	Running mate	Party	Votes	%
Otaviano Pivetta	Gisela Simona (UNIÃO)	Republicanos	1,128,099	60.77
Wellington Fagundes	Reinaldo Morais (NOVO)	Liberal Party	430,442	23.19
Natasha Barreto	Diogo Botelho (PDT)	Social Democratic Party	281,548	15.17
Rafaell Milas	Thales Sartolero	Mission Party	10,300	0.55
Laudicerio Machado	Karen Fortes	Agir	3,210	0.17
Maurício Coelho	Wagner Malheiros	National Mobilization	2,694	0.15
Total			1,856,293	100.00
Valid votes			1,856,293	90.56
Invalid votes			110,735	5.40
Blank votes			82,690	4.03
Total votes			2,049,718	100.00
Registered voters/turnout			2,634,992	77.79

=== Mato Grosso do Sul ===
Candidate	Running mate	Party	Votes	%
Eduardo Riedel (incumbent)	José Carlos Barbosa (Republicanos)	Progressistas	914,323	67.07
Fábio Trad	Gilda Maria	Workers' Party	322,807	23.68
João Henrique Catan	Sérgio Murilo	New Party	98,677	7.24
Delcídio do Amaral	Mariliana Santos (Solidariedade)	Democratic Renewal Party	14,434	1.06
Renato Gomes	Roberto Patzlaff	Christian Democracy	5,589	0.41
Lucien Rezende	Kaelly Saraiva	Socialism and Liberty Party	4,444	0.33
Daniel Lemes	Silvia Benites	Workers' Cause Party	2,115	0.16
Jeferson Bezerra	Valdemir Duarte	Agir	912	0.07
Total			1,363,301	100.00
Valid votes			1,363,301	88.58
Invalid votes			95,189	6.19
Blank votes			80,522	5.23
Total votes			1,539,012	100.00
Registered voters/turnout			2,021,869	76.12

== South ==
=== Paraná ===
Candidate	Running mate	Party	Votes	%
Sergio Moro	Edson Vasconcelos	Liberal Party	3,127,911	50.10
Sandro Alex	Rafael Greca (MDB)	Social Democratic Party	1,583,764	25.37
Requião Filho	Michele Caputo (Solidariedade)	Democratic Labour Party	1,465,601	23.47
Luiz França	João Adolfo	Mission Party	44,581	0.71
Tayná Miessa	Willian Araki	Popular Unity	14,193	0.23
Alexandre Salomão	Daiana Criminacio	National Mobilization	4,144	0.07
Samuel de Mattos	Helena Figueiredo	United Socialist Workers' Party	2,080	0.03
Adriano Teixeira	José Carlos Telles	Workers' Cause Party	1,525	0.02
Total			6,243,799	100.00
Valid votes			6,243,799	91.42
Invalid votes			307,494	4.50
Blank votes			278,322	4.08
Total votes			6,829,615	100.00
Registered voters/turnout			8,600,624	79.41

=== Rio Grande do Sul ===
Candidate	Running mate	Party	Votes	%
Luciano Zucco	Silvana Covatti (PP)	Liberal Party	3,516,048	58.05
Juliana Brizola	Edegar Pretto (PT)	Democratic Labour Party	1,917,374	31.65
Gabriel Souza	Ernani Polo (PSD)	Brazilian Democratic Movement	510,698	8.43
Marecelo Maranata	Claudio Diaz	Brazilian Social Democracy Party	101,978	1.68
Priscila Voigt	Naf Nascimento	Popular Unity	5,716	0.09
Rejane de Oliveira	Adão Lima	United Socialist Workers' Party	3,492	0.06
César Pontes	Tiago Nilo	Workers' Cause Party	2,137	0.04
Total			6,057,443	100.00
Valid votes			6,057,443	90.44
Invalid votes			315,858	4.72
Blank votes			324,123	4.84
Total votes			6,697,424	100.00
Registered voters/turnout			8,516,465	78.64

=== Santa Catarina ===
Candidate	Running mate	Party	Votes	%
Jorginho Mello (incumbent)	Adriano Silva (NOVO)	Liberal Party	2,942,386	68.98
Gelson Merisio	Angela Albino (PDT)	Brazilian Socialist Party	668,021	15.66
João Rodrigues	Carlos Chiodini (MDB)	Social Democratic Party	569,263	13.35
Marcelo Brigadeiro	Marcelo Rodrigues	Mission Party	46,624	1.09
Laís Chaud	Nathália Melo	Popular Unity	21,252	0.50
Ralf Zimmer	Carlos Bordin (Solidariedade)	Democratic Renewal Party	9,000	0.21
Marcus Sodré	Tatiane Pasdiora	United Socialist Workers' Party	6,682	0.16
Bruno Pedreiro	Flávio Amaral	Workers' Cause Party	2,413	0.06
Total			4,265,641	100.00
Valid votes			4,265,641	92.04
Invalid votes			198,989	4.29
Blank votes			169,920	3.67
Total votes			4,634,550	100.00
Registered voters/turnout			5,719,541	81.03
