= Falcão (surname) =

Falcão is a Portuguese surname meaning "falcon". It may refer to:

- Rui Falcão (born 1943), Brazilian politician
- Paulo Roberto Falcão (born 1953), former Brazilian footballer
- Marcondes Falcão Maia (born 1957), Brazilian singer, known mononymously as Falcão
- Marcelo Falcão Custódio (born 1973), Brazilian alternative rock singer-songwriter
- Alessandro Rosa Vieira (born 1977), nicknamed Falcão, Brazilian football and futsal player
- Élson Falcão da Silva (born 1981), Brazilian footballer
- Lud Falcão (born 1989), Brazilian politician
- Luís Eduardo Falcão (born 1984), Brazilian politician
- Maiquel Falcão (1981–2022), Brazilian MMA Fighter
- Radamel Falcao (born 1986), Colombian footballer
- Richard Falcão (born 1987), Brazilian footballer
- Yamaguchi Falcão (born 1987), Brazilian amateur boxer
- Clarice Falcão (born 1989), Brazilian actress, singer-songwriter, screenwriter and comedian
- Esquiva Falcão (born 1989), Brazilian amateur boxer
- Lucas de Oliveira Teodoro Falcão (born 1998), Brazilian footballer
- Lucas Falcão (born 1999), Brazilian footballer
