= Dirceu (disambiguation) =

Dirceu (1952-1995), Dirceu José Guimarães, was a Brazilian football attacking midfielder.

Dirceu may also refer to:

== Given name ==
- Dirceu (footballer, born 1942), Dirceu Ferreira, Brazilian football forward
- Dirceu (footballer, born 1988), Dirceu Wiggers de Oliveira Filho, Brazilian football centre-back
- Dirceu Cabarca (born 1985), Panamanian boxer
- Dirceu Carvalho (1941–2019), Brazilian football left winger
- Dirceu Krüger (1945-2019), Brazilian football midfielder
- Dirceu Lopes (born 1946), Brazilian football attacking midfielder
- Dirceu Marinho (born 1970), Brazilian rower
- Dirceu Pinto (1980-2020), Brazilian Paralympic boccia player
- Dirceu Ten Caten (born 1989), Brazilian politician
- Dirceu Vegini (1952-2018), Brazilian Roman Catholic bishop

== Surname ==
- José Dirceu (born 1946), Brazilian politician
- Xavier Dirceu (born 1977), Brazilian football defensive midfielder

== Other uses ==
- Dirceu Arcoverde, municipality in Piauí, Brazil
- Marília de Dirceu, Brazilian poetry book
