= Adriano Coelho =

Brazilian politician (born 1989)

Member-elect of the Chamber of Deputies
- Assuming office 1 February 2027
- Constituency: Pará

Member of the Legislative Assembly of Pará
- Incumbent
- Assumed office 1 January 2021
- Constituency: At-large

Member of the Municipal Chamber of Belém
- In office 1 January 2017 – 1 January 2021
- Constituency: At-large

Personal details
- Born: Marco Adriano Albuquerque Coelho; 3 January 1989 (age 37) Belém, Pará, Brazil
- Party: MDB (since 2026)
- Other political affiliations: PDT (2016–2026)
- Relatives: João Coelho (brother)

Marco Adriano Albuquerque Coelho (born 3 January 1989) is a Brazilian politician who was elected member of the Chamber of Deputies in 2026. He has been a member of the Legislative Assembly of Pará since 2021.
