= Gustinho Ribeiro =

Brazilian politician (born 1982)

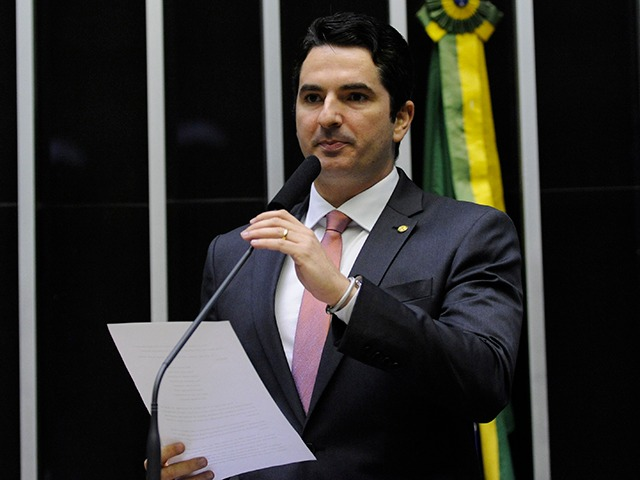
- Ribeiro in 2019

Member of the Chamber of Deputies
- Incumbent
- Assumed office 1 February 2019
- Constituency: Sergipe

Member of the Legislative Assembly of Sergipe
- In office 1 February 2011 – 1 February 2019
- Constituency: At-large

Personal details
- Born: Luiz Augusto Carvalho Ribeiro Filho; 16 February 1982 (age 44) Aracaju, Sergipe, Brazil
- Party: PP (2026–present)
- Other political affiliations: PV (until 2011); PSD (2011–2016); PRP (2016–2018); Solidariedade (2018–2022); Republicanos (2022–2026)

Luiz Augusto Carvalho Ribeiro Filho, better known as Gustinho Ribeiro (born 16 February 1982), is a Brazilian politician serving as a member of the Chamber of Deputies since 2019. From 2011 to 2019, he was a member of the Legislative Assembly of Sergipe.
