= Thiago Araújo (politician) =

Brazilian politician (born 1992)

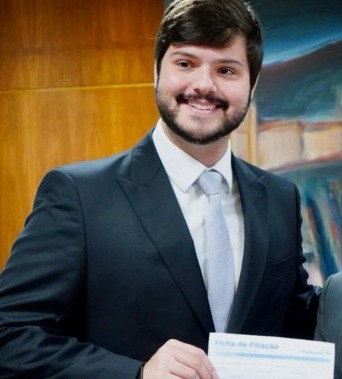
- Araújo in 2024

Member of the Legislative Assembly of Pará
- Incumbent
- Assumed office 1 February 2015

Personal details
- Born: 20 September 1992 (age 34)
- Party: Republicans (since 2024)

Thiago Araújo (born 20 September 1992) is a Brazilian politician serving as a member of the Legislative Assembly of Pará since 2015. He is the chairman of the education committee.
