= Joliane Furia =

Brazilian politician (born 1989)

Member-elect of the Chamber of Deputies
- Assuming office 1 February 2027
- Constituency: Rondônia

Personal details
- Born: Joliane Tamires Duran Simões; 21 December 1989 (age 36) Cacoal, Rondônia, Brazil
- Party: PSD
- Spouse: Adaílton Fúria
- Profession: Nurse

Joliane Tamires Duran Simões (born 21 December 1989), better known as Joliane Furia, is a Brazilian politician who was elected member of the Chamber of Deputies in 2026. She is married to Adaílton Fúria.
