= Daniel Santos (politician) =

Brazilian politician (born 1986)

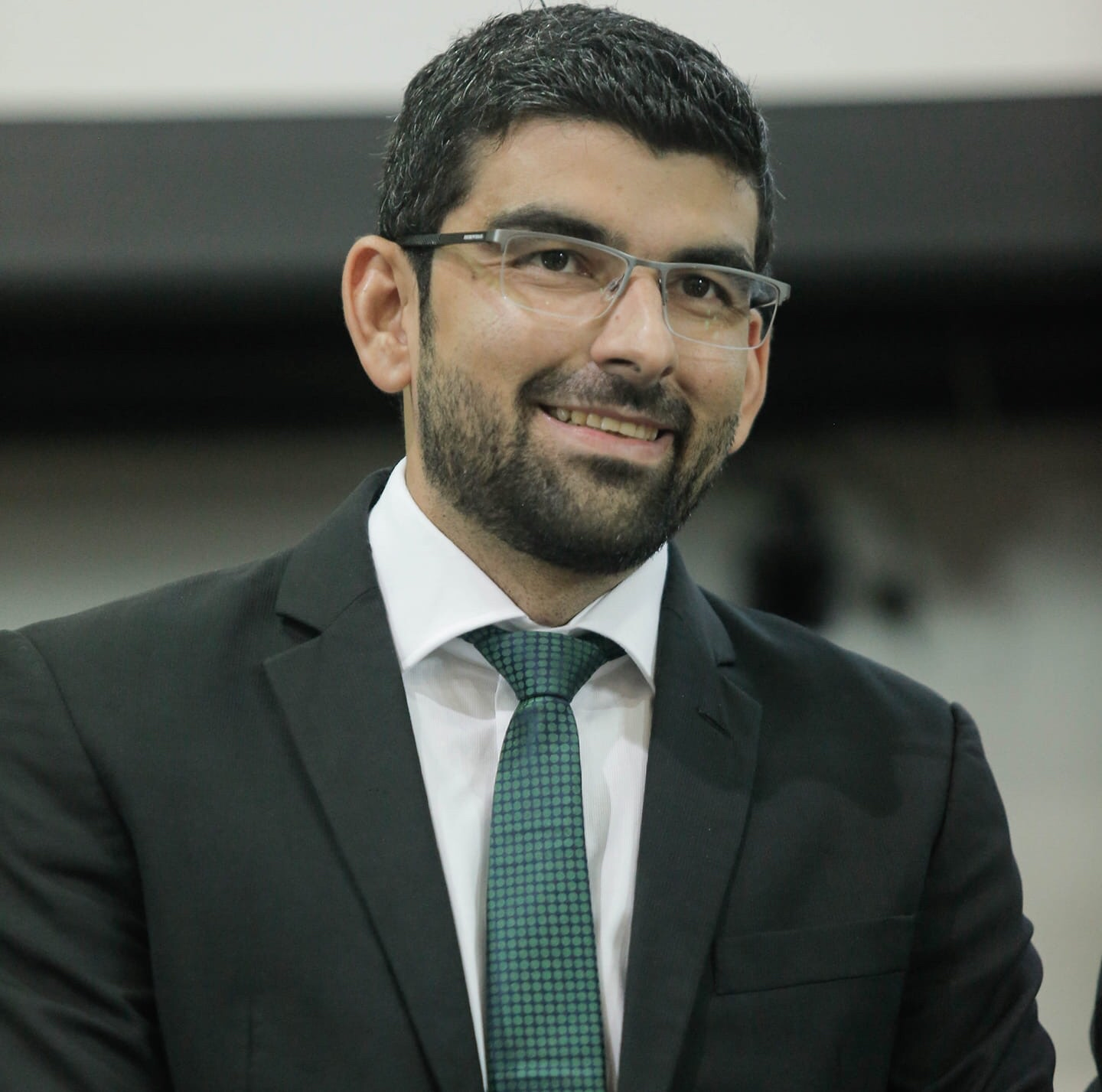
- Santos in 2019

Governor-elect of Pará
- Assuming office 6 January 2027
- Vice Governor: Ellayne D'Almeida (elect)
- Succeeding: Hana Ghassan

Mayor of Ananindeua
- In office 1 January 2021 – 2 April 2026
- Vice Mayor: Erick Monteiro (2021–2023); Hugo Atayde (2023–2026)
- Preceded by: Manoel Pioneiro
- Succeeded by: Hugo Atayde

President of the Legislative Assembly of Pará
- In office 1 February 2019 – 1 January 2021
- Preceded by: Márcio Miranda
- Succeeded by: Chicão Melo

State Deputy of Pará
- In office 1 February 2019 – 1 January 2021
- Constituency: At-large

Personal details
- Born: Daniel Barbosa Santos; 25 August 1986 (age 40) Açailândia, Maranhão, Brazil
- Party: PODE (since 2026)
- Other political affiliations: PSDB (2014–2018); MDB (2018–2024); PSB (2024–2026)
- Spouse: Alessandra Haber
- Occupation: Politician, medical doctor

Daniel Barbosa Santos is a Brazilian politician who is the governor-elect of Pará. He has served as mayor of Ananindeua since 2021. From 2019 to 2020, he served as president of the Legislative Assembly of Pará. He is married to Alessandra Haber.

Political offices
Preceded by Márcio Miranda	President of the Legislative Assembly of Pará; 2019–2021	Succeeded by Chicão Melo
Preceded by Manoel Pioneiro	Mayor of Ananindeua; 2021–2026	Succeeded by Hugo Atayde
Preceded by Hana Ghassan	Governor of Pará; Taking office 2027	Elect
