= Luciano Rezende =

Luciano Rezende may refer to:

- Luciano Rezende (archer)
- Luciano Rezende (politician)
