= Cadu =

Cadu may refer to:

== Nickname ==
- Cadu (footballer, born 1974), Brazilian footballer Ricardo Frederico Rodrigues Antunes
- Cadú (footballer, born 1981), Portuguese footballer Ricardo Manuel Ferreira Sousa
- Cadu (footballer, born 1982), Brazilian footballer Carlos Eduardo Castro da Silva
- Cadú (footballer, born 1986), Brazilian footballer Carlos Eduardo de Fiori Mendes
- Cadu (footballer, born 1997), Brazilian footballer Carlos Eduardo Lopes Cruz
- Cadu (footballer, born 2002), Brazilian footballer Carlos Eduardo Berttolassi da Silva
- Cadu (footballer, born 2004), Brazilian footballer Carlos Eduardo Amaral Pereira de Castro
- Cadu Xavier (born 1978), Brazilian politician

== Other uses ==
- River Cad, Romania (Cadu in Romanian)
