= Mário Chermont =

Brazilian politician (1937–2020)

City councillor of Chaves
- In office 1967–1971

Member of the Legislative Assembly of Pará
- In office 1979–1991

President of the Legislative Assembly of Pará
- In office 1989–1990

Member of the Chamber of Deputies from Pará
- In office 1991–1995

Personal details
- Born: Mário Moraes Chermont; January 21, 1937 Rio de Janeiro, Rio de Janeiro, Brazil
- Died: May 16, 2020 (aged 83) Belém, Pará, Brazil
- Party: Brazilian Labour Party (PTB)
- Other political affiliations: PMDB (former); MDB (former)
- Spouse: Sandra Lúcia Bastos Martins de Barros
- Children: 2
- Education: Federal University of Pará
- Profession: Politician, lawyer

Mário Moraes Chermont (21 January 1937 – 16 May 2020), better known as simply Mário Chermont, was a Brazilian politician and lawyer from the state of Rio de Janeiro that represented the state of Pará at national level.

== Life ==
Before pursuing a career in politics, Chermont graduated in law at the Federal University of Pará (1966–1971).

In 1966, he was elected City councillor of Chaves and kept the position from 1967 to 1971.

In 1978, he was elected Member of the Legislative Assembly of Pará, remaining in power from 1979 to 1991, with two consecutive reelections.

Between 1989 and 1990, Chermont held the post of President of the Legislative Assembly of Pará after being elected by his peers.

In 1990, Chermont was elected Member of the Chamber of Deputies representing the state of Pará. His tenure lasted from 1991 to 1995.

After his first and only tenure as a Federal Deputy, Chermont chose to not run for reelection, returned to Belém and resumed practicing law.

== Personal life ==
Chermont's father, Mário Midosi Chermont was also a politician, known mostly for having been appointed member of the junta that governed the state of Pará in 1930 and for having been elected Member of the Chamber of Deputies from Pará in 1934.

At the time of his death, Chermont was married to Sandra Lúcia Bastos Martins de Barros, having had two sons with her.

== Death ==
On 16 May 2020, Chermont died in Belém aged 83 due to complications from COVID-19 during the COVID-19 pandemic in Brazil.
