= Rosana Martinelli =

Brazilian politician

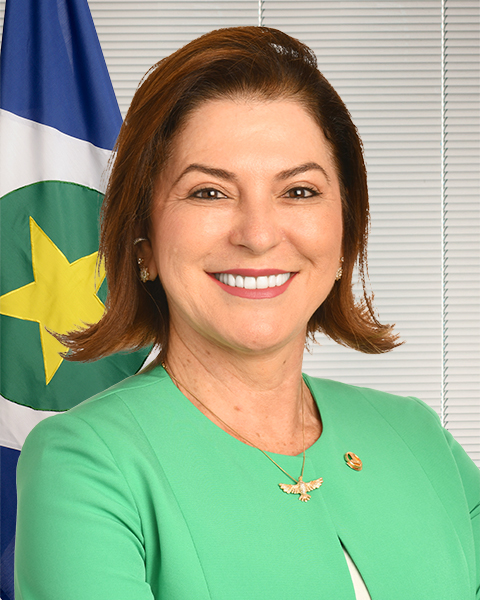
- Official portrait, 2024

Senator for Mato Grosso
- Acting
- Assumed office June 12, 2021
- Preceded by: Wellington Fagundes

Mayor of Sinop
- In office January 1, 2017 – December 31, 2020
- Preceded by: Juarez Costa
- Succeeded by: Roberto Dorner

Personal details
- Born: September 12, 1966 (age 60) Palotina, Paraná
- Party: PL (2012-present)
- Profession: Businesswoman

Rosana Tereza Martinelli (born September 12, 1966) is a Brazilian politician and businesswoman. She has represented Mato Grosso in the Federal Senate since 2024, after the incumbent Wellington Fagundes took a leave of absence for shoulder surgery. Previously she was mayor of Sinop, Mato Grosso from 2017 to 2020 and as Vice-Mayor of the same municipality from 2013 to 2016. She is a member of the Liberal Party (PL).

== Early life ==
Martinelli was born in Palotina, Paraná on September 12, 1966.

Her family moved to Sinop, Mato Grosso with other settlers from Santa Catarina, Paraná, and Rio Grande do Sul. The city, founded in 1974, was named after the abbreviation of the founding company Sociedade Imobiliária Noroeste do Paraná (SINoP) and not the city in Turkey. It became a municipality in 1979.

== Political career ==
=== Municipal career ===
Martinelli was elected Vice-Mayor of Sinop as a member of the Brazilian Socialist Party on a ticket with incumbent Juarez Costa in 2012. She had served as local secretary of Industry and Commerce in Costa's first term.

Martinelli was elected Mayor of Sinop in 2016 as a member of the Party of the Republic.

=== Senate ===
Martinelli did not run for reelection in 2020 and was elected as the second substitute for Wellington Fagundes along with Mauro Carvalho Junior.

Upon her inauguration as substitute she stated "“I reaffirm my commitment to defending life and the family, which is our fundamental pillar. And also the defense of property. I am radical against trespassing. I believe it is essential to guarantee freedom and economic development.”

== Criminal investigation ==
Martinelli had his passport suspended and his accounts blocked by the STF minister, Alexandre de Moraes. She is being investigated in the investigation into the undemocratic acts of January 8th.

Martinelli maintains that she did not participate in the attacks and was not in Brasília on that date.

She said in a statement that she did not agree with any type of vandalism of public buildings, but highlighted that she was in favor of the right to freedom of expression. Rosana Martinelli argued that it is necessary to investigate and punish people who acted in bad faith, but there cannot be generalization.

== Elections ==
Year	Election	Party	Office	Coalition	Partners	Party	Votes	%	Result	Ref.
2012	Sinop Municipal Elections	PSB	Vice-Mayor	More Changes for Sinop PMDB, PSB, PP, PT, PSL, PSC, PR, PV, PRB, PCdoB, PHS, PMN	Juarez Costa	PMDB	35,017	61.12%	Elected	
2016	Sinop Municipal Elections	PR	Mayor	Love for Sinop PR, PMDB, PT, PV, PCdoB, PMN, PMB, PTB, PTC, PTN, PROS	Gilson de Oliviera	PMDB	23,981	39.55%	Elected	
2022	Mato Grosso State Elections	PL	2nd Substitute Senator	Mato Grosso Advancing, Your Life Improving UNIÃO, REP, PL, MDB, PDT, PSB, PROS, PODE, Always Forward (PSDB, CID)	Wellington Fagundes	PL	825,889	63.54%	Elected	
2022	Mato Grosso State Elections	PL	2nd Substitute Senator	Mato Grosso Advancing, Your Life Improving UNIÃO, REP, PL, MDB, PDT, PSB, PROS, PODE, Always Forward (PSDB, CID)	Mauro Carvalho Junior	UNIÃO	825,889	63.54%	Elected	
