= João Coelho (politician) =

Brazilian politician (born 2000)

Member of the Legislative Assembly of Pará
- Incumbent
- Assumed office 1 February 2027

Personal details
- Born: 3 April 2000 (age 26)
- Party: Democratic Labour Party (since 2024)
- Relatives: Adriano Coelho (brother)

João Paulo Albuquerque Coelho (born 3 April 2000) is a Brazilian politician who was elected member of the Legislative Assembly of Pará in 2026. He is the brother of Adriano Coelho.
