= Alessandra Haber =

Brazilian politician (born 1988)

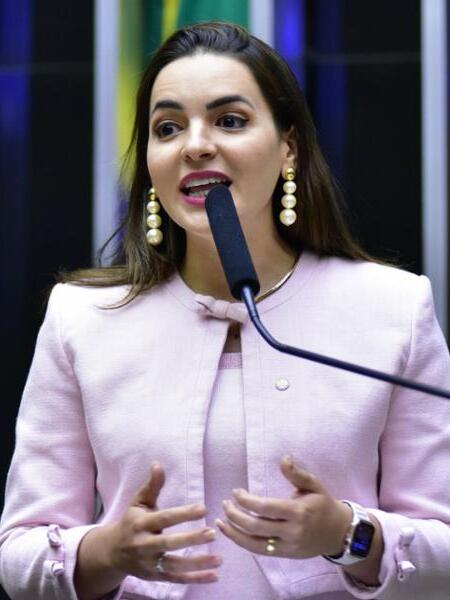
- Haber in 2023

Member of the Chamber of Deputies
- Incumbent
- Assumed office 1 February 2023
- Constituency: Pará

Personal details
- Born: 15 September 1988 (age 37)
- Party: Brazilian Socialist Party (since 2026)
- Spouse: Daniel Santos

Alessandra Haber Carvalho Santos (born 15 September 1988) is a Brazilian politician serving as a member of the Chamber of Deputies since 2023. She is married to Daniel Santos.
