= Cilene Couto =

Brazilian politician

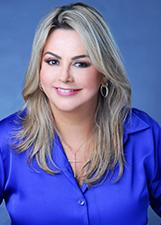
- Cilene Couto in 2022

State Deputy of Pará
- Incumbent
- Assumed office 1 February 2011

Personal details
- Born: Cilene Lisboa Couto Marques; April 3, 1972 (age 54) Belém, Pará, Brazil
- Party: Brazilian Democratic Movement (2026–present)
- Other political affiliations: Brazilian Social Democracy Party (2010–2026)
- Parent: Mário Couto (father)
- Occupation: Politician

Cilene Lisboa Couto Marques (April 3, 1972) is a Brazilian politician affiliated with the Brazilian Democratic Movement (MDB). She has served as a state deputy for the state of Pará since 2011.

== Biography ==
Cilene was born in Belém, the capital of the state of Pará, on April 3, 1972. She is the daughter of Mário Couto, a businessman and former senator from Pará, who is known for being a fierce critic of the Workers’ Party (PT).

=== Politics ===
She entered politics by joining the Brazilian Social Democracy Party (PSDB). In 2010, she ran for state deputy in Pará and was elected with 43,924 votes. She was re-elected to the position with 72,750 votes in 2014, securing another seat in the Legislative Assembly of Pará (ALEPA). She was re-elected in 2018 as a state representative for Pará, receiving 93,614 votes and winning a third term.

In 2021, during the PSDB’s presidential primaries, she declared his support for João Dória, then governor of the state of São Paulo, as the party’s candidate in the 2022 presidential election. In 2022, she won her fourth term as a state representative for Pará, after receiving 91,611 votes, making her the woman with the most votes in the election.

In 2026, after more than a decade as a member of the PSDB, she switched parties and joined the Brazilian Democratic Movement (MDB). The party’s induction ceremony was attended by the governor of Pará, Helder Barbalho. In the same year, she won her fifth term in the ALEPA after receiving more than 90,000 votes, making her the fourth-highest vote-getter in the election.

==== Election performance ====
Year	Position held	Votes	Result	Ref.
2010	State deputy of Pará	43.924	Elected	
2014	State deputy of Pará	72.750	Elected	
2018	State deputy of Pará	93.614	Elected	
2022	State deputy of Pará	91.611	Elected	
2026	State deputy of Pará	92.730	Elected	
