= Amaro Neto =

Brazilian politician

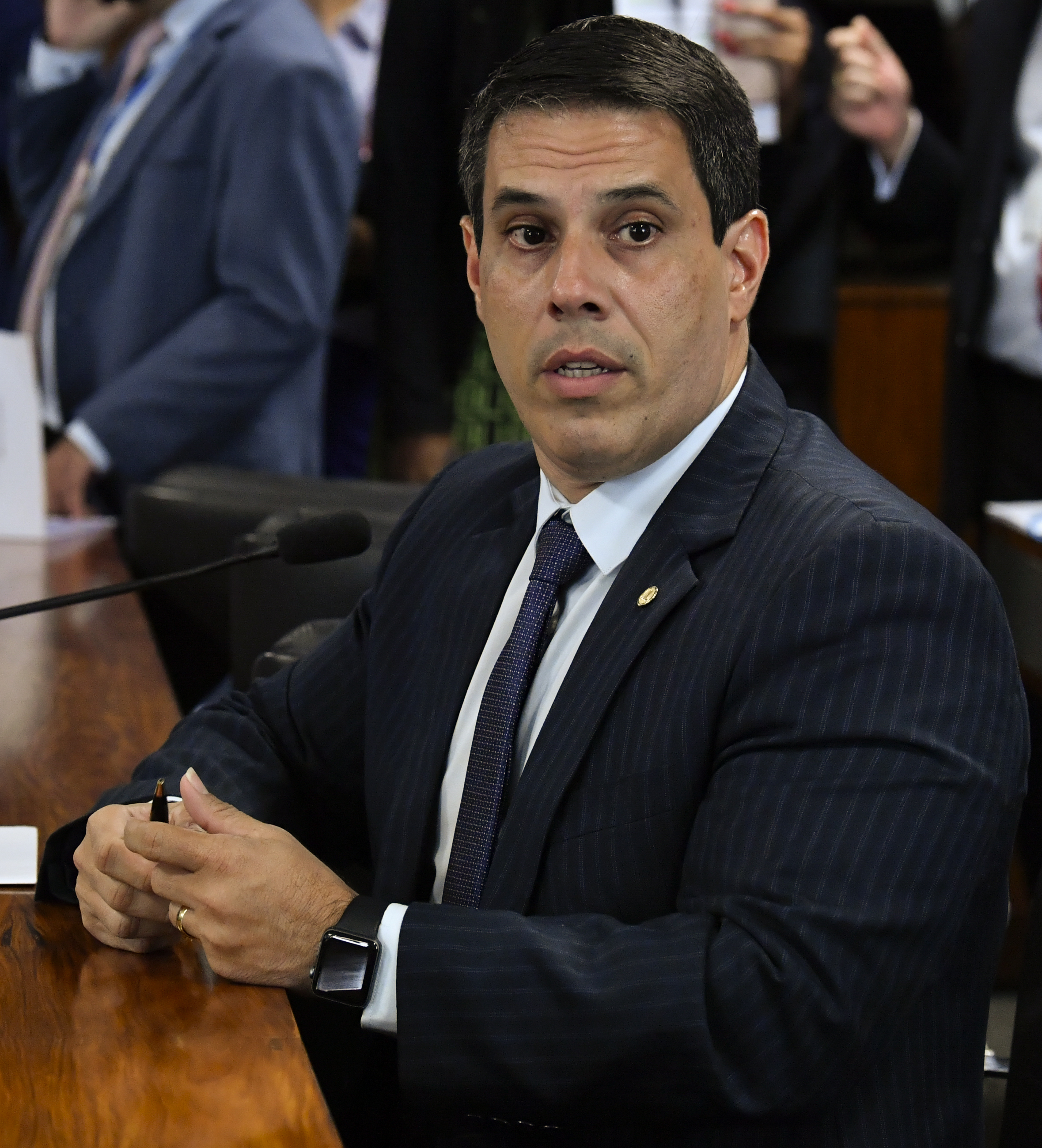
- Born: Amaro Rocha Nascimento Neto; December 4, 1976 (age 49); Vitória, Espírito Santo, Brazil
- Occupations: Journalist, politician
- Years active: 2009–current

Amaro Rocha Nascimento Neto (Vitória, Espírito Santo, Brazil, December 4, 1976) is a journalist, sportscaster, editor, television presenter, radio broadcaster and Brazilian politician. He worked in communications companies in Espírito Santo and outside the state.

== Political life ==
In 2014, he was the state deputy elected with the highest number of votes, with 55,408 votes.

Amaro disputed the second round of the 2016 municipal elections of Vitória, by Solidariedade (SDD), against Luciano Rezende, of PPS, the former mayor of the city. Amaro obtained 48.81% (91,034) of the votes, against 51.19% of his opponent in the second round.

In 2018, he was elected the most voted federal deputy in the history of Espírito Santo, with 181,813 votes.

In 2022, he was re-elected federal deputy for Espírito Santo, with 52,375 votes.

== Television presenter ==
Since 2009, Amaro has presented the "Balanço Geral" program, on TV Vitória, an affiliate of RecordTV in Espírito Santo. In 2012, he made a stop at Band Minas, in Belo Horizonte, where he presented the Brasil Urgente local. But in 2014, he returned to Espirito Santo to apply for the position of state deputy, where he was the most voted of the state.

=== Media career ===
- Sucesso dos Bairros – Rádio Tropical
- Bom Dia Alegria – Transamérica Hits (Alfredo Chaves)
- Ronda Policial – Rádio Espírito Santo
- Balanço Geral – TV Vitória
- Brasil Urgente – Band Minas
