= Luciano Rezende (politician) =

Brazilian doctor, former athlete and politician

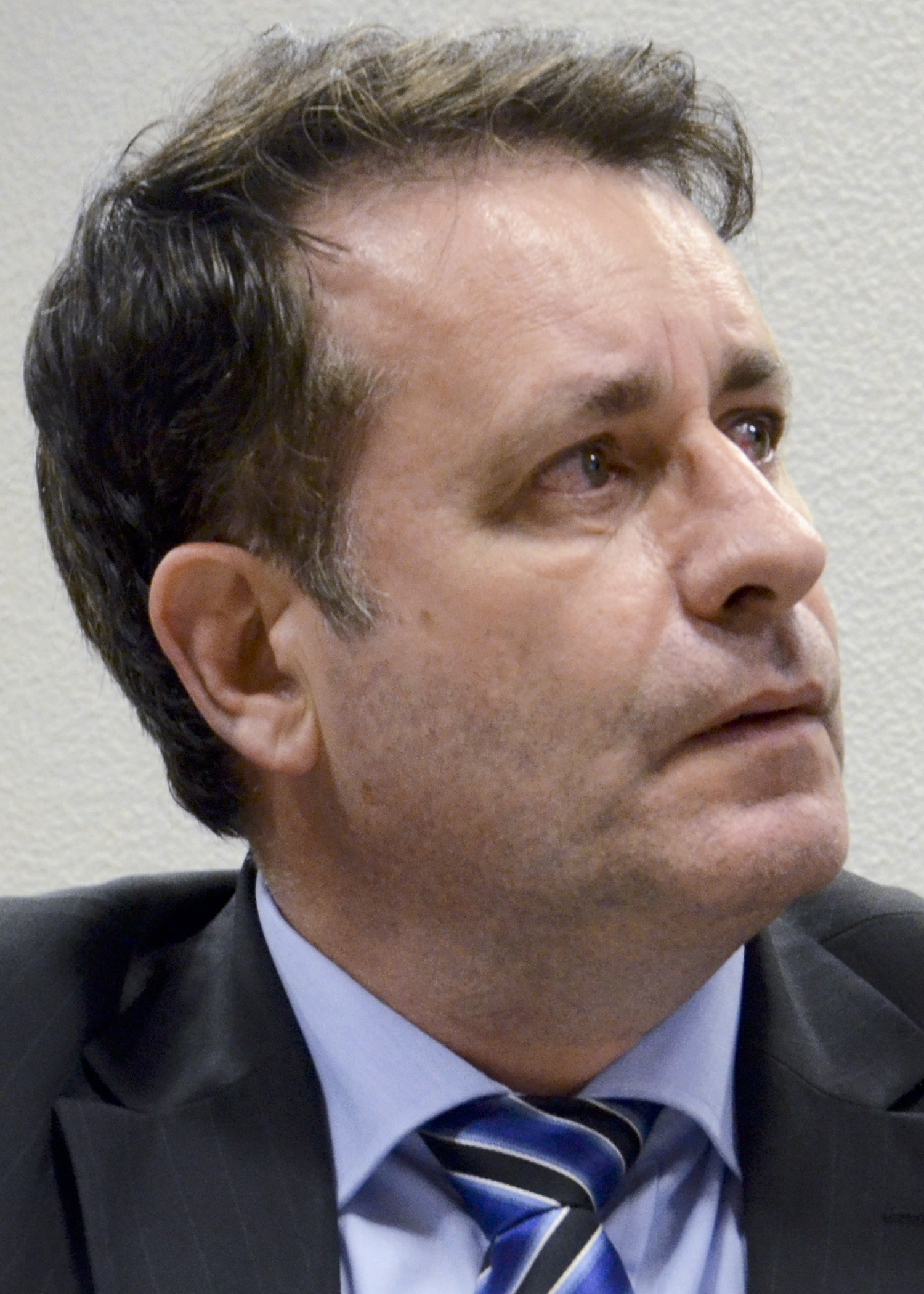

Mayor of Vitória
- In office 1 January 2013 – 31 December 2020
- Preceded by: João Coser
- Succeeded by: Lorenzo Pazolini

State deputy of Espírito Santo
- In office 1 January 2011 – 31 December 2012

Councilman for Vitória
- In office 1995–2008

Personal details
- Born: Luciano Santos Rezende; 22 March 1962 (age 64) Cachoeiro de Itapemirim, Espírito Santo, Brazil
- Party: PT (1992–1996); Cidadania (1996–present)

Luciano Santos Rezende (born 22 March 1962) is a Brazilian doctor, former athlete, and politician. He was the mayor of the city of Vitória from 2013 to 2020. Prior to being mayor, he was a state deputy for the state of Espírito Santo, as well as a councilor for the city of Vitória. He is a member of Cidadania.

== Biography ==
Rezende was born in 1962 in Cachoeiro de Itapemirim. He is a doctor, having done post-graduate work in sports medicine. During his time as an athlete, he was a rowing champion in Brazil and at the South American championship in Uruguay in 1979. He also came in 6th place at the University World Championship of Rowing in the Netherlands in 1986.

He was a city councilor in Vitória from 1995 to 2008. In 2008, he ran against incumbent mayor João Coser to become the mayor of Vitória. He was not elected, only obtaining 32% of the vote and losing in the first round. In 2010, he was elected a state deputy with more than 20,000 votes.

In 2012, he again ran for mayor, this time facing former mayor Luiz Paulo Vellozo (PSDB) and former minister and federal deputy Iriny Lopes (PT). Defying previous polling, which indicated Vellozo as the favorite, Rezende came in first place in the first round, with 39% of the votes. On 28 October 2012, he won a tight victory in the second round with around 52% of the votes.

In 2016, Rezende was re-elected mayor with 51% of the vote, defeating state deputy Amaro Neto (SD).
