= Cinthia de Allyson =

Brazilian politician (born 1996)

- Cinthia de Allyson in 2026

Member of the Legislative Assembly of Rio Grande do Norte
- Incumbent
- Assumed office 1 February 2027

Personal details
- Born: 6 January 1996 (age 30)
- Party: Brazil Union
- Spouse: Allyson Bezerra (m. 2020)

Cinthia Raquel Pinheiro da Silva (born 6 January 1996), better known as Cinthia de Allyson, is a Brazilian politician who was elected member of the Legislative Assembly of Rio Grande do Norte in 2026. She is married to Allyson Bezerra.
