= Cacoal Airport =

Airport in Brazil

Capital do Café Airport Aeroporto Capital do Café

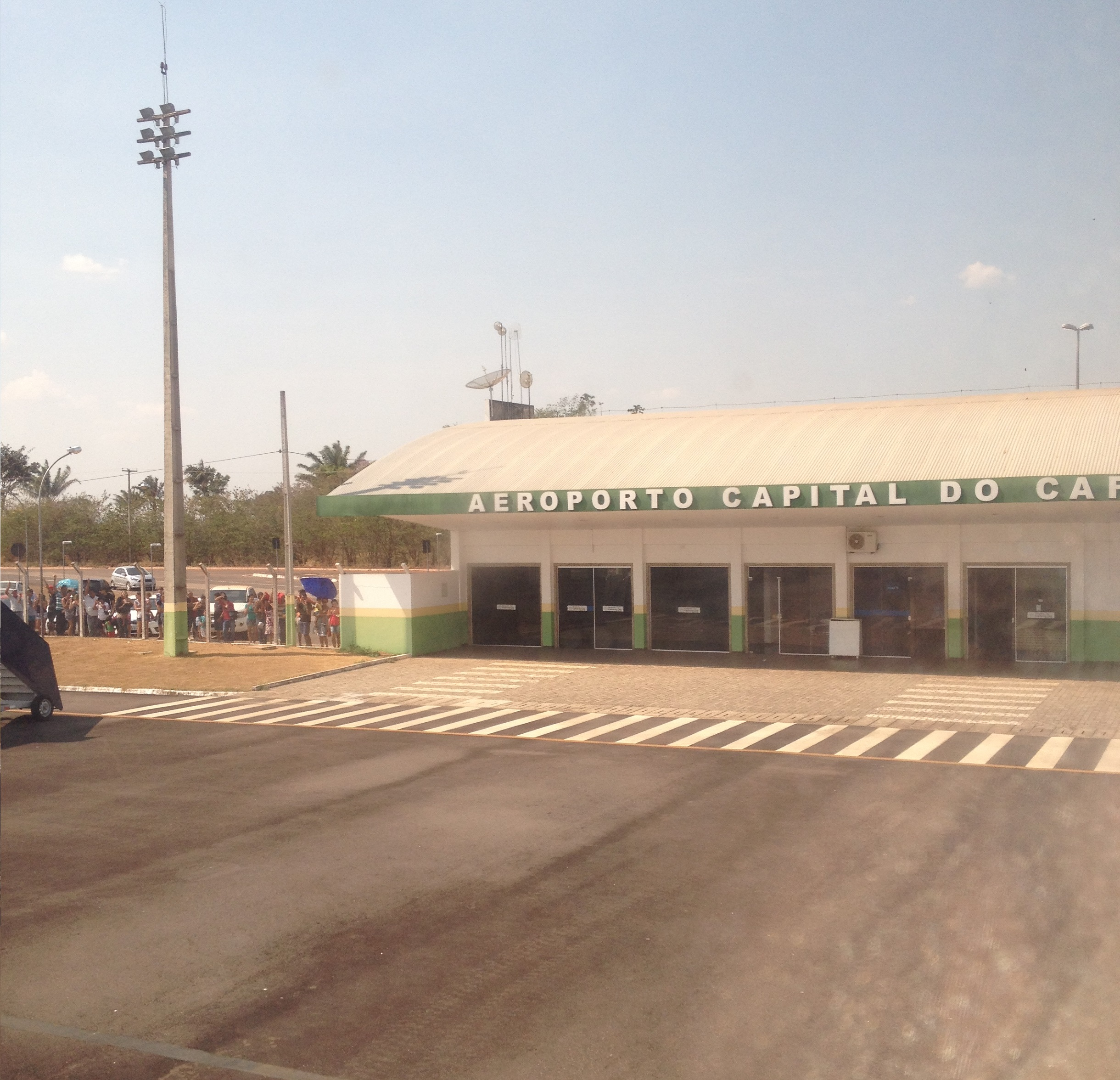
- IATA: OAL; ICAO: SSKW; LID: RO0004

Summary
- Airport type: Public
- Operator: GRU Airport
- Serves: Cacoal
- Opened: June 2, 2009
- Time zone: BRT−1 (UTC−04:00)
- Elevation AMSL: 249 m (817 ft)
- Coordinates: 11°29′44″S 061°27′03″W

Map
- Location in Brazil OAL (Brazil)

Runways
Direction	Length		Surface
Direction	m	ft	Surface
17/35	2,100	6,890	Asphalt
- Sources: ANAC, DECEA

Capital do Café Airport (IATA: OAL, ICAO: SSKW) is the airport serving Cacoal, Brazil.

It is managed by GRU Airport

== History ==
The airport was commissioned on June 2, 2009. It was built as a replacement to an older facility located closer to downtown which was then closed.

On November 27, 2025 GRU Airport won the concession to operate the airport.

== Airlines and destinations ==
Airlines	Destinations
Azul Brazilian Airlines	Campinas, Cuiabá

== Access ==
The airport is located 10 km (6 mi) from downtown Cacoal.

== See also ==
- List of airports in Brazil
