= 2024 Vitória mayoral election =

- October 6, 2024
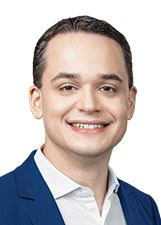

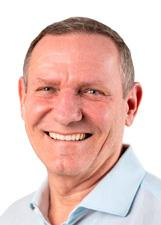

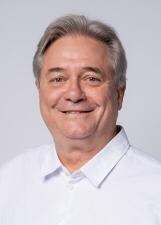
Nominee	Lorenzo Pazolini	João Coser	Luiz Paulo Lucas
Party	Republicanos	PT	PSDB
Alliance	Vitória of Unity	Vitória First	Vitória for the Future
Running mate	Cris Samorini	Priscilla Manso	Victor Ricciardi Rocha
Popular vote	105,599	29,339	23,397
Percentage	56.22%	15.62%	12.46%
Mayor before election
Lorenzo Pazolini
Republicanos
Elected mayor
Lorenzo Pazolini
Republicanos
- Parliamentary election
Party	Leader	Vote %	Seats	+/–
Municipal Chamber
Republicanos	Aylton Dadalto		3	+2
PP	Anderson Goggi		3	+2
PSB	Aloisio Varejão		3	+2
FE Brasil	Karla Koser		3	+1
PODE	André Brandino		2	0
PL	Darcio Bracarense		2	+2
MDB	João Flavio		1	+1
PRD	Mauricio Leite		1	−1
NOVO	Leonardo Monjardim		1	+1
PSOL-REDE	Ana Paula Rocha		1	0
Solidarity	Dalto Neves		1	+1
PSDB-Cidadania	None		0	−3
UNIÃO	None		0	−1
PDT	Pedro Tápias		0	−1
This lists parties that won seats. See the complete results below.

The 2024 Vitória municipal election took place in the city of Vitória, Brazil on 6 October 2024. Voters elected a mayor, vice mayor, and 21 councillors.

The incumbent mayor, Lorenzo Pazolini of the Republicanos was elected first in 2020.

Pazolini was reelected in the first round.

== Results ==
=== Mayor ===
Candidate	Running mate	Party	Votes	%
Lorenzo Pazolini(incumbent)	Cris Samorini (PP)	Republicans	105,599	56.22
João Coser	Priscilla Manso (PV	Workers' Party	29,339	15.62
Luiz Paulo Vellozo Lucas	Victor Ricciardi Rocha (UNIÃO)	Brazilian Social Democracy Party	23,397	12.46
Capitão Assumção	Mayra Marcarini	Liberal Party	17,946	9.55
Camila Valadão	Macaciel Breda (REDE)	Socialism and Liberty Party	10,773	5.74
Du	Wagner Borges (PRTB)	Avante	786	0.42
Total			187,840	100.00
Valid votes			187,840	94.16
Invalid votes			5,964	2.99
Blank votes			5,682	2.85
Total votes			199,486	100.00
Registered voters/turnout			266,570	74.83
PSD hold				

Popular vote (first round)
Pazolini	56.22%
Coser	15.62%
Paulo	12.46%
Assumção	9.55%
Valadão	5.74%
Du	0.42%
