= George Morais (politician) =

Brazilian politician (born 1981)

Member-elect of the Chamber of Deputies
- Assuming office 1 February 2027
- Constituency: Paraíba

Member of the Legislative Assembly of Paraíba
- Incumbent
- Assumed office 1 February 2023
- Constituency: At-large

Personal details
- Born: George Ventura Morais; 27 January 1981 (age 45) João Pessoa, Paraíba, Brazil
- Party: PL (since 2026)
- Relatives: Efraim Filho (brother)
- Profession: Lawyer, teacher

George Ventura Morais (born 27 January 1981) is a Brazilian politician who was elected member of the Chamber of Deputies in 2026. He has been a member of the Legislative Assembly of Paraíba since 2023. He is the son of Efraim Morais and the brother of Efraim Filho.
