= Ellayne D'Almeida =

Brazilian politician (born 1986)

- D'Almeida in 2026

Vice Governor of Pará
- Assuming office 6 January 2027
- Governor: Daniel Santos
- Succeeding: Hana Ghassan

Personal details
- Born: 4 February 1986 (age 40)
- Party: Liberal Party (since 2026)

Ellayne Cristina Gurgel de Almeida (born 4 February 1986) is a Brazilian politician who was elected vice governor of Pará in 2026. She previously worked as a businesswoman in the gold mining industry and served as coordinator of the Flávio Bolsonaro 2026 presidential campaign in the Trans-Amazonian region.
