= Fábio Mitidieri =

Brazilian politician (born 1977)

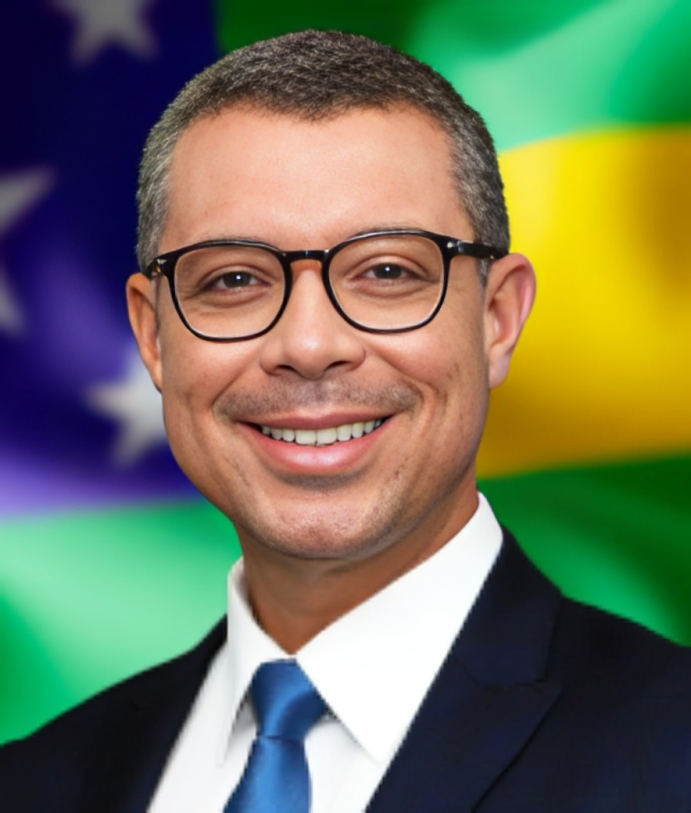
- Mitidieri in 2023

Governor of Sergipe
- Incumbent
- Assumed office 1 January 2023
- Preceded by: Belivaldo Chagas

Member of the Chamber of Deputies
- In office 1 February 2015 – 1 January 2023
- Constituency: Sergipe

Personal details
- Born: 24 February 1977 (age 49)
- Party: Social Democratic Party (since 2011)

Fábio Cruz Mitidieri (born 24 February 1977) is a Brazilian politician serving as governor of Sergipe since 2023. From 2015 to 2023, he was a member of the Chamber of Deputies.
