= Dirceu Ten Caten =

Brazilian politician (born 1989)

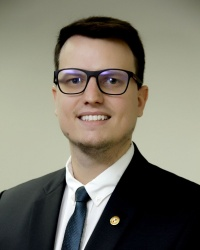
- Ten Caten in 2019

Member of the Legislative Assembly of Pará
- Incumbent
- Assumed office 1 February 2015

Personal details
- Born: 6 November 1989 (age 36)
- Party: Workers' Party (since 2007)

Dirceu Ten Caten Pies (born 6 November 1989) is a Brazilian politician serving as a member of the Legislative Assembly of Pará since 2015. He is the group leader of the Workers' Party in the Assembly.
