= Lud Falcão =

Brazilian politician (born 1989)

Member of the Legislative Assembly of Minas Gerais
- Incumbent
- Assumed office 1 February 2023

Personal details
- Born: 27 April 1989 (age 37)
- Party: Republicans
- Spouse: Luís Eduardo Falcão

Ludimila Fonseca Azevedo Falcão (born 27 April 1989), better known as Lud Falcão, is a Brazilian politician serving as a member of the Legislative Assembly of Minas Gerais since 2023. She is married to Luís Eduardo Falcão.
