= Legislative Assembly of Sergipe =

Coordinates: 10°54′50″S 37°2′53″W

Legislative Assembly of Sergipe Assembleia Legislativa de Sergipe
- 20th Legislative Assembly of Sergipe

Type
- Type: Unicameral

Leadership
- President: Jeferson Andrade, PSD since 1 February 2023
- Government Leader: Cristiano Cavalcante, UNIÃO
- Opposition Leader: Georgeo Passos, Cidadania

Structure
- Seats: 24 deputies
- Political groups: Government (18) PSD (5) UNIÃO (4) Republicans (3) PL (3) PP (2) PDT (1) Opposition (6) Cidadania (2) PV (2) PSOL (1) PT (1)

Elections
- Voting system: Proportional representation

Meeting place
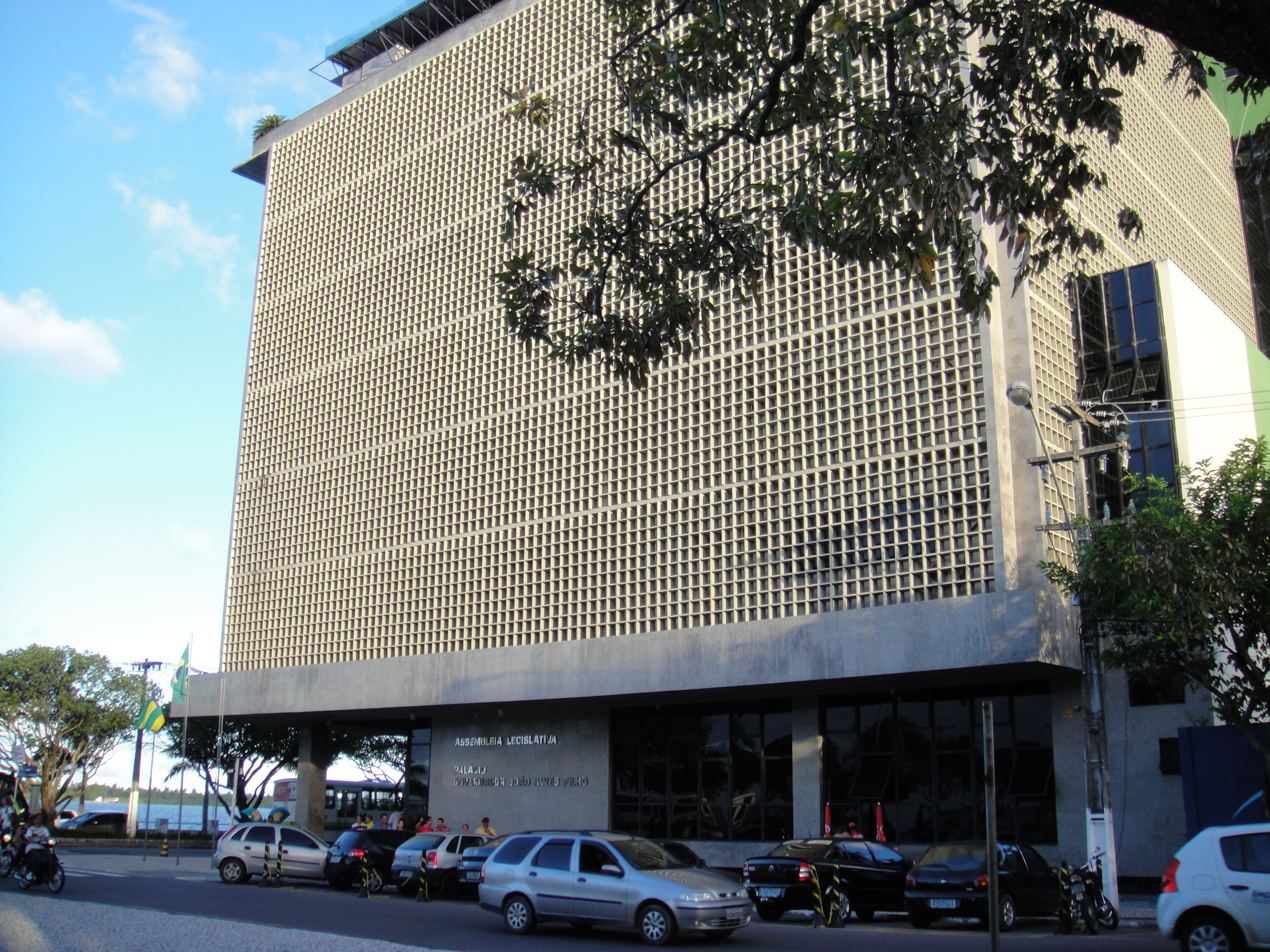
- Aracaju

Website
- www.al.se.gov.br

The Legislative Assembly of Sergipe (Portuguese: Assembleia Legislativa de Sergipe) is the unicameral legislature of Sergipe state in Brazil. It has 24 state deputies elected by proportional representation.

The Province of Sergipe was consolidated on October 24, 1824. The first Provincial Assembly started in 1835; Cônego Antônio Fernandes da Silveira was the first president. On June 24, 2004, the TV Alese was created.
