= Cacoal =

- Municipality
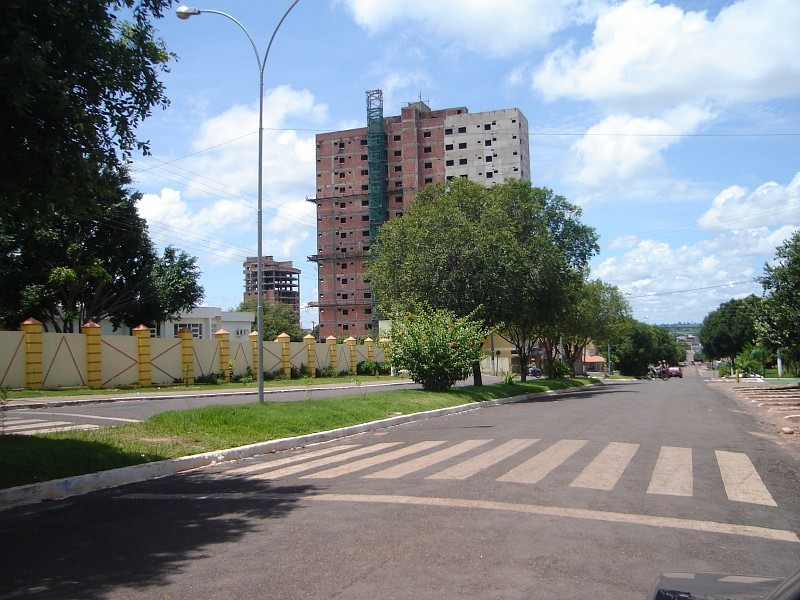
- Guapore Avenue, Cacoal

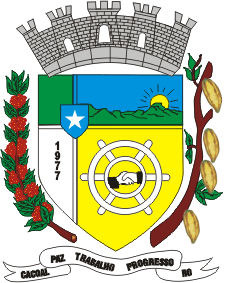
- Flag Coat of arms

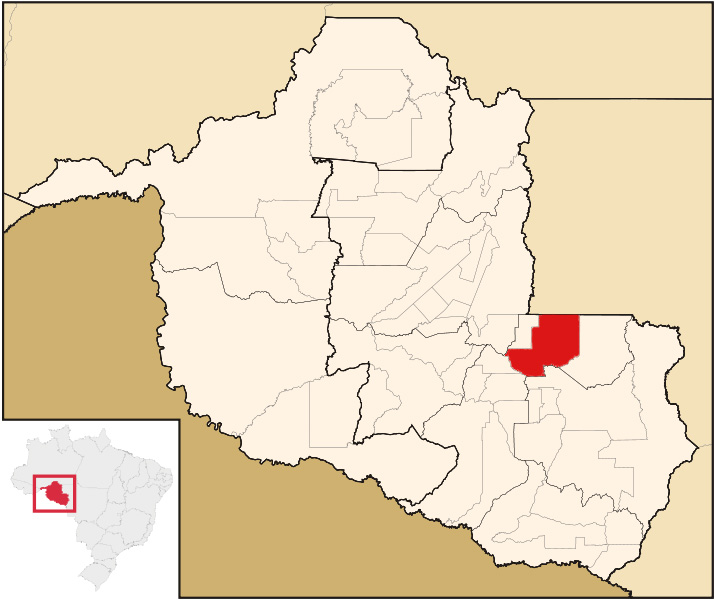
- Municipal location within the State of Rondônia

- Location in Brazil
- Coordinates: 11.43861°S 61.44722°W
- Country: Brazil
- State: Rondônia
- Municipality: Cacoal
- Founded: October 11, 1977

Government
  - Mayor: Adaílton Fúria PSD

Area
  - Total: 3,792.892 km^{2} (1,464.444 sq mi)
- Elevation: 206 m (676 ft)

Population (2020)
  - Total: 85,893
  - Density: 22.646/km^{2} (58.652/sq mi)
- Demonym: cacoalense
- Time zone: UTC−4 (AMT)
- Website: www.cacoal.ro.gov.br

Cacoal is a municipality in the Brazilian state of Rondônia. It has an area of 3,792.892 square kilometres (1,464.444 sq mi). It has a Tropical savanna climate. As of 2020 the estimated population was 85,893. It is the fourth-largest city in Rondônia state.

The city is served by Capital do Café Airport.

== History ==
The name of the region dates to the time of Marechal Cândido Rondon, who noticed a large amount of native cocao there near the bank of the Ji-Paraná River (Machado River). He recommended that the guard Anízio Serrão build a house there, and Serrao requested the site to be granted to him in 1912, calling it Cacoal. The village of Cacoal emerged in the 1960s, when the BR-364 highway began to be opened. In 1960, the rubber tapper and gold miner José Cassimiro Lopes built a shack on the left side of the highway, where he remained until the early 1970s.

Work on the road intensified in the 1970s. Large sections on mud developed in the winter and drivers who were prevented from continuing their journey waited at the rubber tapper's house. They built huts where they put the goods they carried for sale to prevent them from spoiling. José Cassimiro Lopes had part of his land expropriated, leaving him with what now covers the neighborhoods Bandeirantes, Arco-Íris, Vista Alegre and part of the Industrial Sector. The fertile lands attracted migrants, who began to settle on them. Traders established themselves, offering the farmers staples and clothing.

Cacoal was separated from Porto Velho and raised to the status of municipality and district with the name Cacoal by Federal Law No. 6,448, of 10 November 1977. The two districts of Cacoal and Riozinho were created on 26 November 1977.

== Demographics ==
The population in the 2010 census was 78,574. The estimated population as of 2019 was 85,359. Population density as of 2010 was 20.72 inhabitants per square kilometre (53.7/sq mi). As of 2010, 97.6% of the population had attended school between the ages of 6 and 14. Also as of 2010, the municipal Human Development Index was 0.718. This compares to 0.407 in 1991 and 0.567 in 2000.

On the 2010 census, religion was reported as Catholic by 33,535 people, Evangelical by 30,675 people and Animism by 447 people.

== Geography ==
Cacoal is in the state of Rondônia, Brazil. It has an area of 3,792.892 square kilometres (1,464.444 sq mi) as of 2019. The elevation above sea level is about 206 metres (676 ft).

=== Climate ===
The Köppen climate type is Aw : Tropical savanna climate.

Climate data for Cacoal
Month	Jan	Feb	Mar	Apr	May	Jun	Jul	Aug	Sep	Oct	Nov	Dec	Year
Mean daily maximum °C (°F)	29.6 (85.3)	29.2 (84.6)	29.8 (85.6)	29.6 (85.3)	29.6 (85.3)	30.5 (86.9)	31.5 (88.7)	33.3 (91.9)	31.7 (89.1)	30.9 (87.6)	30.4 (86.7)	30.0 (86.0)	30.5 (86.9)
Daily mean °C (°F)	23.9 (75.0)	24.1 (75.4)	24.3 (75.7)	23.9 (75.0)	23.7 (74.7)	23.1 (73.6)	23.0 (73.4)	24.9 (76.8)	24.5 (76.1)	24.2 (75.6)	24.1 (75.4)	24.1 (75.4)	24.0 (75.2)
Mean daily minimum °C (°F)	18.2 (64.8)	19.1 (66.4)	18.9 (66.0)	18.2 (64.8)	17.9 (64.2)	15.7 (60.3)	14.5 (58.1)	16.5 (61.7)	17.3 (63.1)	17.6 (63.7)	17.9 (64.2)	18.2 (64.8)	17.5 (63.5)
Average precipitation mm (inches)	314 (12.4)	293 (11.5)	286 (11.3)	172 (6.8)	65 (2.6)	15 (0.6)	11 (0.4)	27 (1.1)	80 (3.1)	141 (5.6)	227 (8.9)	268 (10.6)	1,899 (74.9)
Source: http://en.climate-data.org/location/31797/

== Economy ==
In 2017, the average monthly salary of formal workers was 2.0 minimum wages. Formally employed people were 22.2% of the total population. Households with monthly income of up to half a minimum wage per person represent 35.6% of the population. Estimates of GDP per capita:

== Health and sanitation ==
52.5% of households have adequate sanitation, 86.6% of urban households are on public roads with afforestation and 11.7% of urban households are on public roads with adequate urbanization (presence of manhole, sidewalk, pavement and curb). Annual hospitalizations due to diarrhea are 1 per 1,000 inhabitants. Deaths per 1,000 live births:

== Municipal finances ==
Committed municipal expenditure by year:

Realized municipal revenue by year:

== See also ==
- List of municipalities in Rondônia

== Sources ==
- Brasil / / Cacoal, IBGE
- "Cacoal", Geonames
- Cacoal, Brazilian Institute of Geography and Statistics
- "Cacoal, Brazil", Mindat
- História, IBGE
