= Helder Salomão =

Brazilian politician (born 1964)

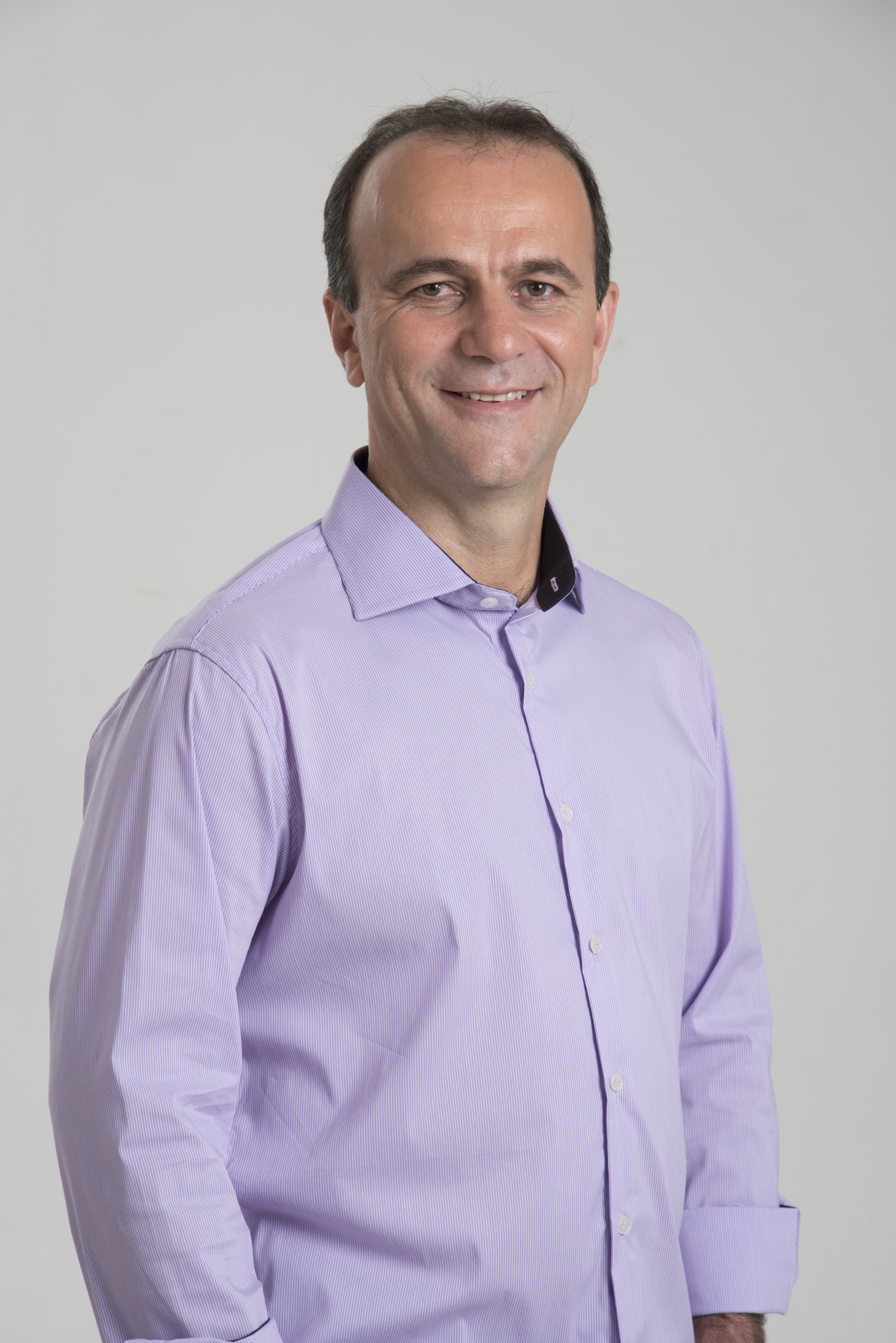
- Salomão in 2014

Member of the Chamber of Deputies
- Incumbent
- Assumed office 1 February 2015
- Constituency: Espírito Santo

Personal details
- Born: 8 March 1964 (age 62)
- Party: Workers' Party (since 1982)

Helder Ignacio Salomão (born 8 March 1964) is a Brazilian politician serving as a member of the Chamber of Deputies since 2015. From 2005 to 2012, he served as mayor of Cariacica. From 2003 to 2004, he was a member of the Legislative Assembly of Espírito Santo.
