= Allyson Bezerra =

Brazilian politician (born 1992)

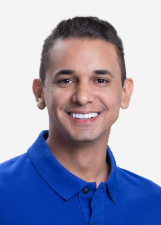
- Bezerra in 2024

Mayor of Mossoró
- Incumbent
- Assumed office 1 January 2021
- Preceded by: Rosalba Ciarlini

Personal details
- Born: 12 May 1992 (age 34) Mossoró
- Party: Brazil Union (since 2023)
- Spouse: Cinthia de Allyson (m. 2020)

Allyson Leandro Bezerra Silva (born 12 May 1992) is a Brazilian politician serving as mayor of Mossoró since 2021. From 2019 to 2020, he was a state deputy of the Legislative Assembly of Rio Grande do Norte.

He served as the 39th mayor of Mossoró from 2021 to 2026, resigning in March 2026 to run for state governor.
