= Jeferson Andrade =

Brazilian politician (born 1980)

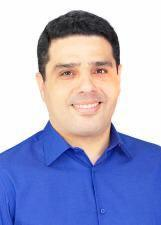
- Andrade in 2022

President of the Legislative Assembly of Sergipe
- Incumbent
- Assumed office 1 February 2023
- Preceded by: Luciano Bispo

Personal details
- Born: 13 June 1980 (age 46)
- Party: Social Democratic Party (since 2011)

Jeferson Luiz de Andrade (born 13 June 1980) is a Brazilian politician serving as a member of the Legislative Assembly of Sergipe since 2011. He has served as president of the assembly since 2023.
