= Efraim Filho =

Brazilian politician (born 1979)

- Official portrait, 2023

Senator for Paraíba
- Incumbent
- Assumed office 1 February 2023

Federal Deputy
- In office 1 February 2007 – 1 February 2023
- Constituency: Paraíba

Personal details
- Born: Efraim de Araújo Morais Filho; 18 March 1979 (age 47) João Pessoa, Paraíba, Brazil
- Party: PL (2026–present)
- Other political affiliations: PFL (1996–2007); DEM (2007–2022); UNIÃO (2022–2026)
- Parent: Efraim Morais (father)
- Relatives: George Morais (brother)

Efraim de Araújo Morais Filho (born 18 March 1979) is a Brazilian politician serving as a member of the Senate since 2023. From 2007 to 2023, he was a member of the Chamber of Deputies.
