= Adaílton Fúria =

Brazilian lawyer and politician

Adailton Antunes Ferreira
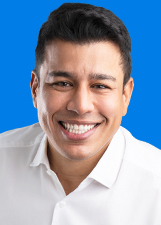
- Fúria em 2024

Mayor of Cacoal
- In office January 1, 2021 – April 2, 2026
- Deputy: Tony Pablo Castro Chaves
- Preceded by: Glaucione Rodrigues
- Succeeded by: Tony Pablo

State Deputy of Rondônia
- In office February 1, 2019 – December 16, 2020

City Councilor of Cacoal
- In office January 1, 2013 – October 7, 2016

Personal details
- Born: September 24, 1986 (age 40) Cacoal, Rondônia, Brazil
- Citizenship: Brazilian
- Party: Social Democratic Party (PSD)
- Other political affiliations: Brazilian Social Democracy Party; Brazilian Republican Party (PRB)
- Spouse: Joliane Furia
- Occupation: Lawyer; Politician
- Nickname: Adailton Fúria

Adailton Antunes Ferreira (September 24, 1986), better known as Adailton Fúria, is a Brazilian lawyer and politician affiliated with the Social Democratic Party (PSD). He served as a state deputy for Rondônia and is mayor of Cacoal, in the interior of the state.

== Biography ==
=== Early years and education ===
He was born in September 1986, in the city of Cacoal, in the interior of the state of Rondônia. He graduated with a degree in law.

=== Politics ===
He began his political career in the Brazilian Social Democracy Party (PSDB) in 2008, running for city councilor in Cacoal. He was not elected after receiving 249 votes. In 2012, affiliated with the Brazilian Republican Party (PRB), he ran for office again. He was elected by the PRB, winning an elected office for the first time.

In 2014, he ran for state representative of Rondônia representing the PRB. He was unsuccessful in the election. Still affiliated with the PRB, he ran for mayor of Cacoal. Defeated, he came in second in the election, surpassed by lawyer Glaucione Rodrigues (PMDB).

He switched to the Social Democratic Party (PSD) and ran for state representative of Rondônia in 2018. He was elected after receiving 12,859 votes, becoming a state deputy.

In 2020, he ran for mayor of Cacoal. He was elected after receiving more than 60% of the votes. To take office as mayor, he had to resign from his position as state representative. He resigned during a session of the Rondônia Legislative Assembly, chaired by Laerte Gomes (PSDB). He took office at the Cacoal City Hall on January 1, 2021.

He ran for re-election to the position in 2024.During his first term, Cassio Gois (Republicans) served as deputy mayor, but in his reelection campaign, he chose to form a coalition with Tony Pablo Castro Chaves, also affiliated with the PSD. After receiving more than 80% of the votes, Fury was re-elected to office. In April 2026, he resigned as mayor of Cacoal to run as a preliminary candidate for governor of Rondônia.

==== Electoral performance ====
Year	Position	Party	Votes	Result	Ref.
2008	City councilor of Cacoal	Brazilian Social Democracy Party	249	Not elected	
2012	City councilor of Cacoal	Brazilian Republican Party	1 237	Elected	
2014	State deputy for Rondônia	Brazilian Republican Party	3 879	Not elected	
2016	Mayor of Cacoal	Brazilian Republican Party	12 870	Not elected	
2018	State deputy for Rondônia	Social Democratic Party	12 859	Elected	
2020	Mayor of Cacoal	Social Democratic Party	25 791	Elected	
2024	Mayor of Cacoal	Social Democratic Party	40 270	Elected	
