= Expedito Netto =

Brazilian politician (born 1988)

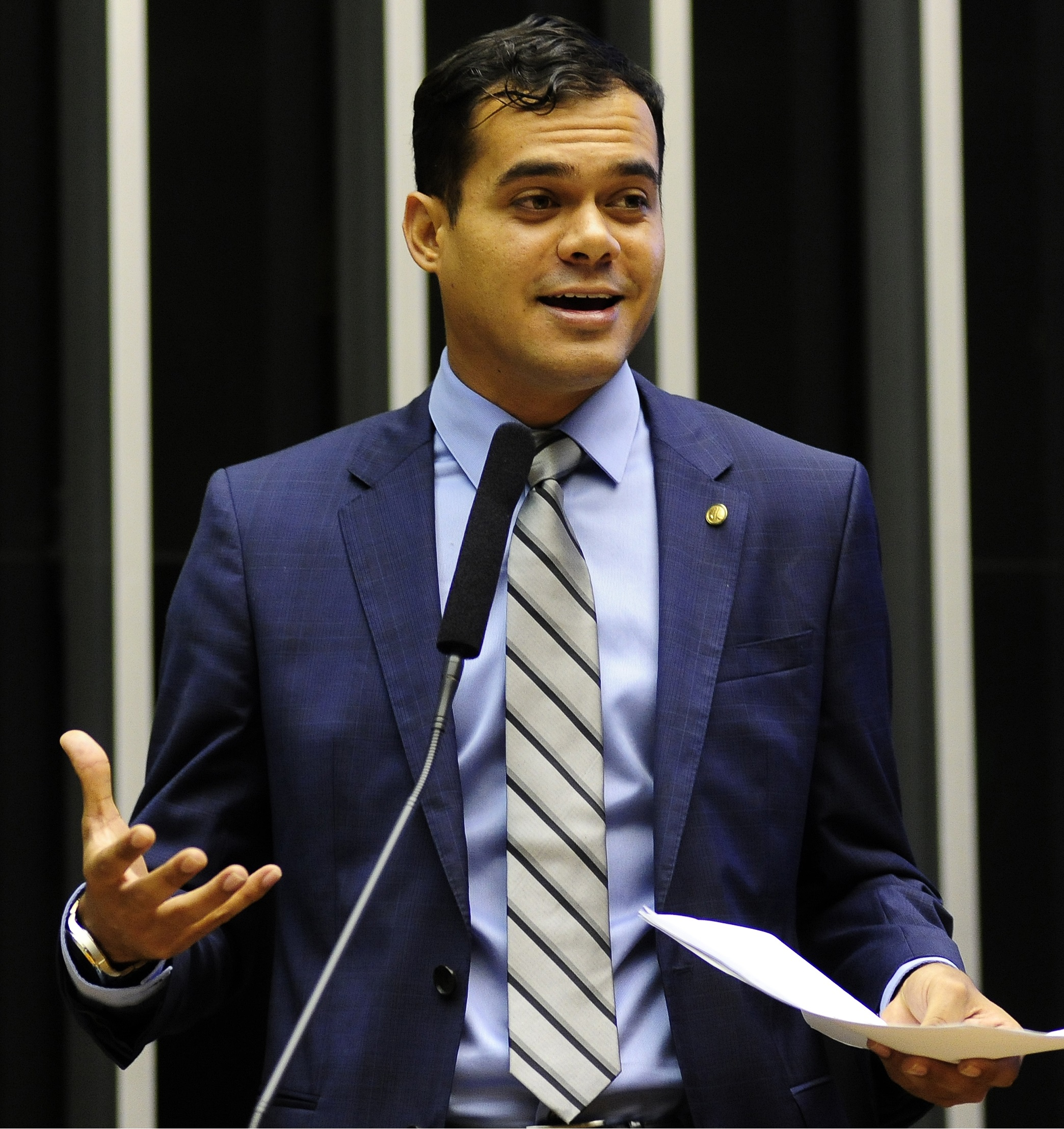
- Netto in 2015

Member of the Chamber of Deputies
- In office 1 February 2015 – 31 January 2023
- Constituency: Rondônia

Personal details
- Born: 5 October 1988 (age 38)
- Party: PT (since 2026)
- Parent: Expedito Júnior (father)

Expedito Gonçalves Ferreira Netto (born 5 October 1988) is a Brazilian politician. From 2015 to 2023, he was a member of the Chamber of Deputies. He is the son of Expedito Júnior.
