= Lorenzo Pazolini =

Brazilian former police chief and politician

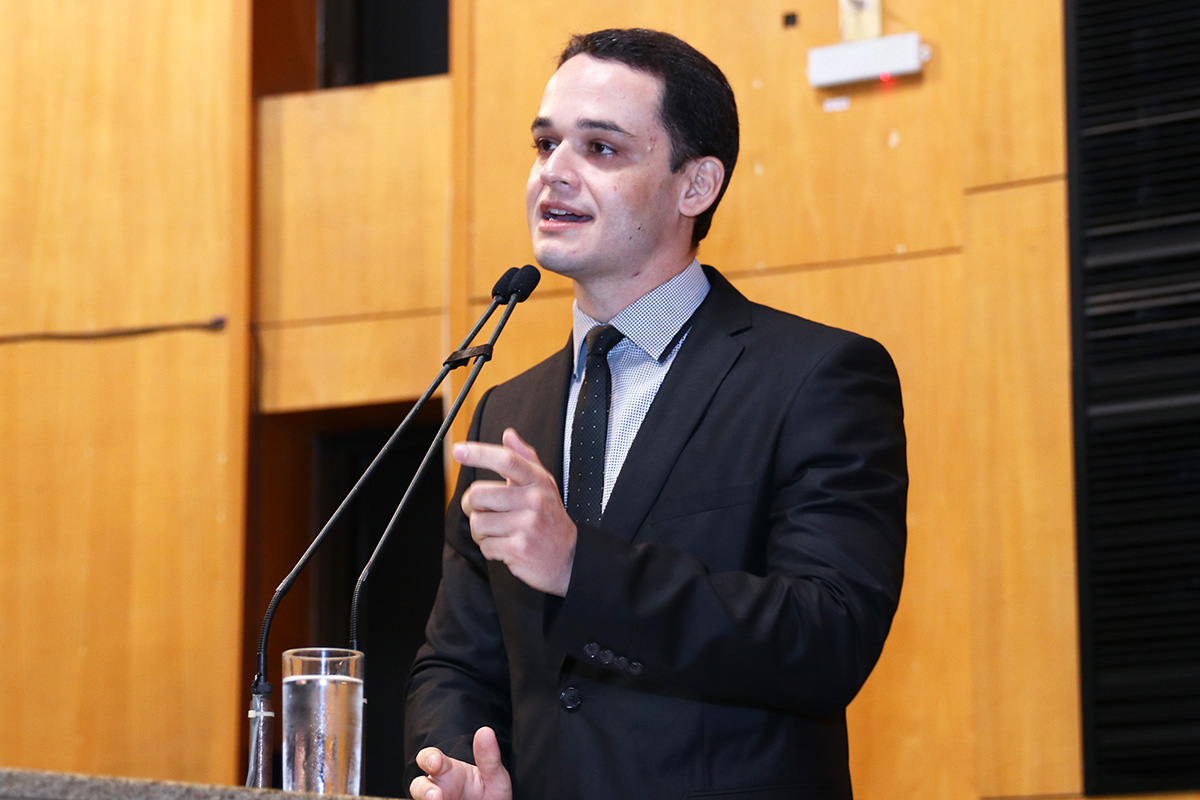

Governor-elect of Espírito Santo
- Assuming office 6 January 2027
- Vice Governor: Eliane Leal (elect)
- Succeeding: Ricardo Ferraço

Mayor of Vitória
- In office 1 January 2021 – 1 April 2026
- Vice Mayor: Estéfane Franca (2021–2024); Cris Samorini (2025–2026)
- Preceded by: Luciano Rezende
- Succeeded by: Cris Samorini

State Deputy of Espírito Santo
- In office 1 February 2019 – 31 December 2020
- Constituency: At-large

Personal details
- Born: Lorenzo Silva de Pazolini; 20 May 1982 (age 44) Vitória, Espírito Santo, Brazil
- Party: PRP (2018–2019); Republicanos (2019–present)

Lorenzo Silva de Pazolini (born 20 May 1982) is a Brazilian former police chief and politician and the governor-elect of the state of Espírito Santo. He has been the mayor of the city of Vitória since 2021. Prior to becoming mayor, he was a state deputy in the state of Espírito Santo. He is a member of the Republicanos.

== Biography ==
Pazolini was born in Vitória in 1982. He graduated with a degree in law, with a post-graduate degree in Public Safety Management. He was the external control auditor of the state audit office (Tribunal de Contas). He is a police chief who was the head of the Children and Adolescents Protection unit.

In 2018, he was elected a state deputy with 43,293 votes, or 2.22% of the vote, as a member of the Progressive Republican Party (PRP). In 2020, he was elected mayor of Vitória with 102,466 votes, or 58.50% of the vote, succeeding Luciano Rezende. He beat former mayor João Coser for the seat. He took office on 1 January 2021. He was reelected in 2024.

Pazolini ran for governor of Espírito Santo in 2026, and was elected, winning 52.17% of the vote in the runoff election on October 25, 2026.

Political offices
Preceded by Luciano Rezende	Mayor of Vitória; 2021–2026	Succeeded by Cris Samorini
Preceded by Ricardo Ferraço	Governor of Espírito Santo; Taking office 2027	Elect
