= List of mayors of Vitória, Espírito Santo =

Mayor of Vitória
- Prefeito de Vitória
- Coat of arms of Vitória

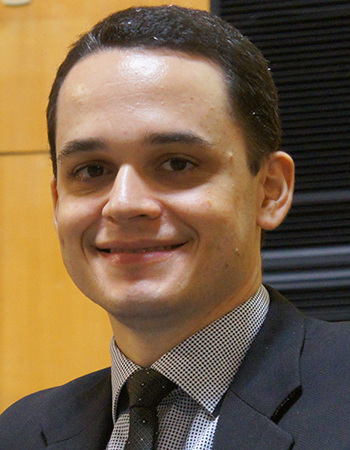
- Incumbent; Lorenzo Pazolini since 1 January 2021
- Municipal government of Vitória
- Term length: Four years, renewable once consecutively
- Deputy: Vice Mayor of Vitória

The following is a list of mayors of the city of Vitória, in the state of Espírito Santo, Brazil.

- 13 Ceciliano Abel de Almeida, 1909
- 14 José Bernardino Alves Júnior, 1909-1910
- 15 Carlos Xavier Paes Barreto, 1910
- 16 Antônio Francisco de Atayde, 1910
- 17 Cassiano Cardoso Castello, 1910-1911
- 18 Waldemiro Fradesco da Silveira, 1911-1913
- 19 Washington T. Vasconcelos Pessoa, 1913, 1914-1916
- Euclides Camargo, 1913-1914, 1920
- 20 Henrique de Novaes, 1916-1920
- José de Souza Monteiro, 1920
- 21 Antonio Pereira Lima, 1920-1924
- 22 Otávio Indio do Brasil Peixoto, 1924-1928
- Moacyr Monteiro Avidos, 1928-1930
- Asdrubal Martins Soares, 1930-1933
- 23 Laerte Rangel Brígido, 1933
- Augusto Seabra Muniz, 1933-1935
- 24 Álvaro Sarlo, 1935-1936
- 25 Paulino Muller, 1936-1937
- 26 Américo Poli Monjardim, 1937-1944, 1946-1947
- 27 Henrique de Novaes, 1945
- 28 Danton Bastos, 1945-1946
- 29 Nelson Goulart Monteiro, 1946
- 30 Cecialiano Abel de Almeida, 1947-1948
- 31 Álvaro de Castro Matos, 1948-1951
- 32 José Ribeiro Martins, 1951-1953
- 33 Armando Duarte Rabelo, 1953-1955
- 34 Serynes Pereira Franco, 1955
- Adelpho Poli Monjardim, 1955-1957, 1959-1963
- Mário Gurgel, 1957-1958
- Oswaldo Cruz Guimarães, 1958-1959
- Danglar Ferreira da Costa, 1962-1963
- Solon Borges Marques, 1963-1966
- 35 Jair Andrade, 1966-1967
- 36 Setembrino I. Netto Pelissari, 1967-1970, 1975
- 37 Silvio Marques, 1967
- Jair Cruz do Nascimento, 1970
- 38 Décio da Silva Thevenard, 1970-1971
- Luiz Carlos Peixoto, 1971
- Edmar Machado, 1972-1973
- Lúcio Toscano Aragon, 1975
- 39 Chrisógono Teixeira da Cruz, 1971-1975
- Carlos Moacyr Monjardim, 1978
- 40 Wander José Bassini, 1978-1979
- Wlamir Coelho da Silva, 1979, 1983
- Carlos A. Lindenberg Von Schilgen, 1979-1982
- 41 Wallace Vieira Borges, 1982
- 42 Rudy Maurer, 1982-1983
- 43 Vitor de Souza Martins, 1983
- 44 Ferdinand Berredo de Menezes, 1983-1984
- 45 Moacyr Cypreste, 1984
- 46 Ferdinand Berredo de Menezes, 1984-1985
- 47 Estanislau Kostka Stein, 1985
- 48 José Moraes, 1985
- 49 Hermes L. Laranja Gonçalves, 1986-1988
- 50 Edson Rodrigues Batista, 1986
- 51 José Roberto Zanoni, 1987-1988
- 52 Vitor Buaiz, 1989-1992
- 53 Paulo César Hartung Gomes, 1993-1996
- 54 Luiz Paulo Vellozo Lucas, 1997-2004
- João Carlos Coser, 2005-2012
- 57 Luciano dos Santos Rezende, 2012-2021
- 63 Lorenzo Pazolini, 2021-present

== See also ==
- Câmara Municipal de Vitória (city council)
- Vitória, Espírito Santo municipal election, 2012
- Vitória, Espírito Santo municipal election, 2016
- List of mayors of largest cities in Brazil (in Portuguese)
- List of mayors of capitals of Brazil (in Portuguese)
