= Vicentinho Júnior =

Brazilian politician (born 1985)

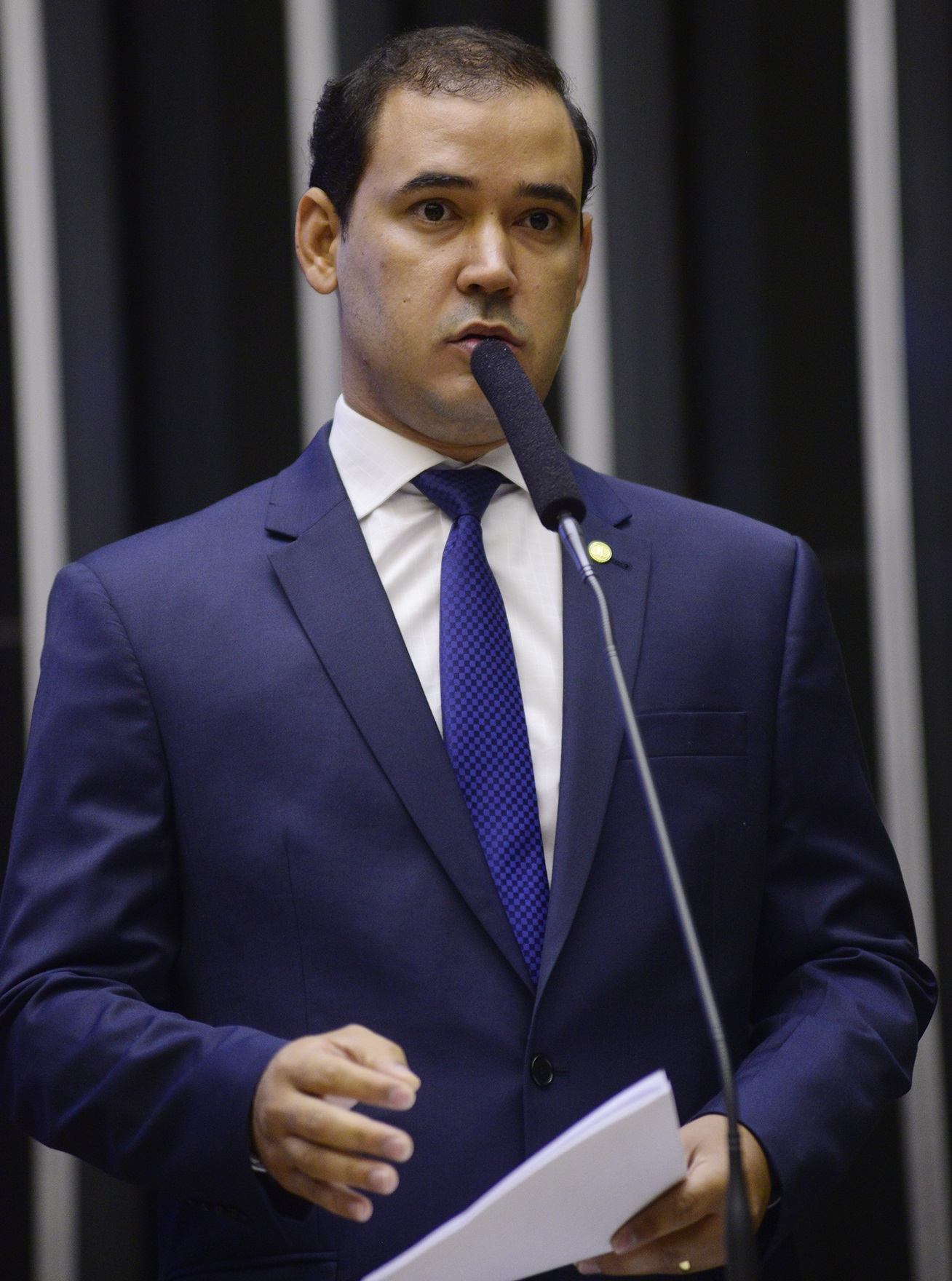
- Vicentinho Júnior in September 2015

Governor-elect of Tocantins
- Assuming office 6 January 2027
- Vice Governor: Amélio Cayres
- Succeeding: Wanderlei Barbosa

Federal Deputy
- Incumbent
- Assumed office 1 February 2015
- Constituency: Tocantins

Personal details
- Born: Vicente Alves de Oliveira Júnior; 11 April 1985 (age 41) Goiânia, Goiás, Brazil
- Party: PSDB (2026–present)
- Other political affiliations: PR (2007–2009); PSC (2009–2013); PSB (2013–2016); PL (2016–2022); PP (2022–2026)

Vicente Alves de Oliveira Júnior (born 11 April 1985) better known as Vicentinho Júnior is a Brazilian politician and the governor-elect of the state of Tocantins. Although born in Goiás, he has spent his political career representing Tocantins, having served as federal deputy representative since 2015.

== Personal life ==
Vicentinho Júnior was born to Vicente Alves de Oliveira e Adailde Alves de Oliveira. In addition to being a politician, Vicentinho Júnior previously was a businessman.

== Political career ==
Initially affiliated with the Brazilian Socialist Party, Vicentinho Júnior was elected to the chamber of deputies under the party's banner in the 2014 Brazilian general election. In 2015 he joined the Party of the Republic. In November 2018 Vicentinho Júnior became the leader of the Party of the Republic for the state of Tocantins.

Vicentinho Júnior voted against the impeachment of then-president Dilma Rousseff. He voted in favor of the 2017 Brazilian labor reform, and would vote in favor of opening of a corruption investigation into Rousseff's successor Michel Temer.

On October 25, 2026, Júnior was elected as governor of Tocantins as a member of the Brazilian Social Democratic Party, winning the runoff election with 64.52% of the vote.

Political offices
Preceded by Wanderlei Barbosa	Governor of Tocantins; Taking office 2027	Elect
