= Jéssica Sales =

Brazilian politician

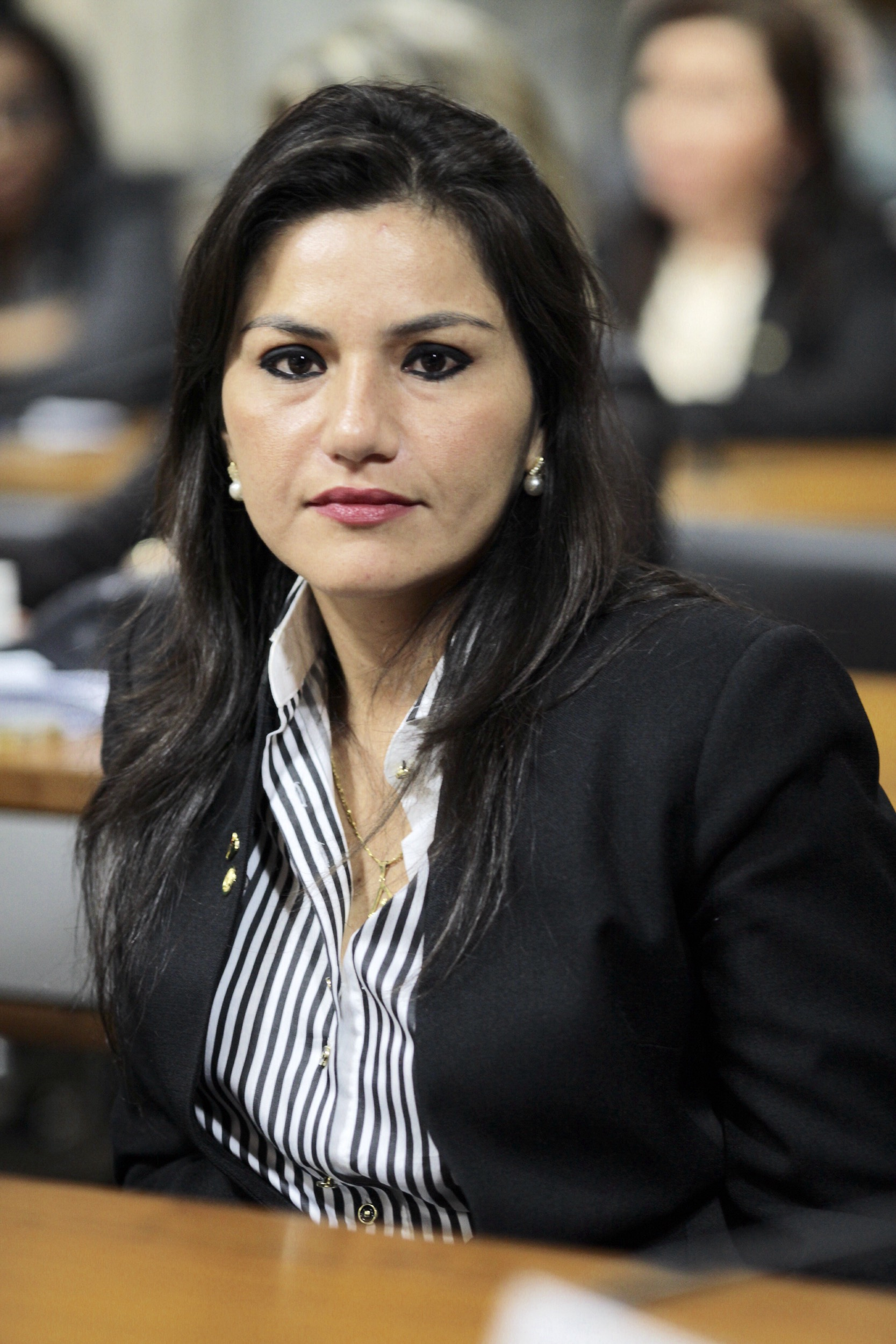
- Sales in 2015

Member of the Chamber of Deputies
- Incumbent
- Assumed office 1 February 2015
- Constituency: Acre

Personal details
- Born: Jésica Rojas Sales; 28 November 1980 (age 45) Cruzeiro do Sul, Acre, Brazil
- Party: MDB (since 2011)
- Profession: Physician

Jéssica Rojas Sales (born 28 November 1980) is a Brazilian politician as well as a physician and gynecologist. She has spent her political career representing Acre, having served as federal deputy representative of Acre since 2015.

== Personal life ==
Sales comes from a political family, being the daughter of the former mayor of Cruzeiro do Sul, Vagner Sales, and former congresswoman Antonia Sales. Before becoming a politician, she worked as a medic, more specifically a gynecologist.

== Political career ==
In the 2014 Brazilian general election Sales was elected to the Federal Chamber of Deputies with 20,339. She was the fifth most voted for candidate from Acre in the election.

Sales voted in favor of the impeachment motion of then-president Dilma Rousseff. She voted in favor of tax reforms and the 2017 Brazilian labor reform, and voted against opening a corruption investigation into Rousseff's successor Michel Temer.
