= Luís Eduardo Falcão =

Brazilian politician (born 1984)

- Falcão in 2025

Lieutenant Governor-elect of Minas Gerais
- Assuming office 6 January 2027
- Governor: Cleitinho Azevedo
- Succeeding: Mateus Simões

Personal details
- Born: 16 March 1984 (age 42)
- Party: Republicans (since 2026)
- Spouse: Lud Falcão

Luís Eduardo Falcão Ferreira (born 16 March 1984) is a Brazilian politician who was elected vice governor of Minas Gerais in 2026. From 2021 to 2026, he served as mayor of Patos de Minas. He is married to Lud Falcão.
