= Cadu Xavier =

Brazilian politician (born 1978)

- Xavier in 2026

Governor-elect of Rio Grande do Norte
- Assuming office 6 January 2027
- Succeeding: Fátima Bezerra

Personal details
- Born: Carlos Eduardo Xavier; 14 June 1978 (age 48) Rio de Janeiro, Brazil
- Party: PT (since 2021)
- Education: Federal University of Rio Grande do Norte
- Profession: Computer engineer, tax auditor

Carlos Eduardo Xavier (born 14 June 1978) is a Brazilian politician who was elected governor of Rio Grande do Norte in 2026. From 2023 to 2026, he served as secretary of finance of Rio Grande do Norte. From 2019 to 2023, he served as secretary of taxation of Rio Grande do Norte.

Political offices
Preceded by Fátima Bezerra	Governor of Rio Grande do Norte; Taking office 2027	Elect
