= Wellington Fagundes =

Brazilian politician (born 1957)

Senator for Mato Grosso
- Incumbent
- Assumed office February 1, 2015
- Preceded by: Jayme Campos

Federal Deputy for Mato Grosso
- In office February 1, 1991 – January 31, 2015

Personal details
- Born: June 1, 1957 (age 69) Rondonópolis, Mato Grosso
- Party: PL (2006-present)
- Other political affiliations: PL (2001-2006); PSDB (1999-2001); PL (1987-1999); PDT (1985-1987); PDS (1980-1985)
- Profession: Veterinarian, politician

Wellington Fagundes (born June 1, 1957) is a Brazilian veterinarian and politician. He has represented Mato Grosso in the Federal Senate since 2015. Previously he was a deputy from Mato Grosso from 1991 to 2015. He is a member of the Liberal Party (PL).
