= Hana Ghassan =

Brazilian politician (born 1968)

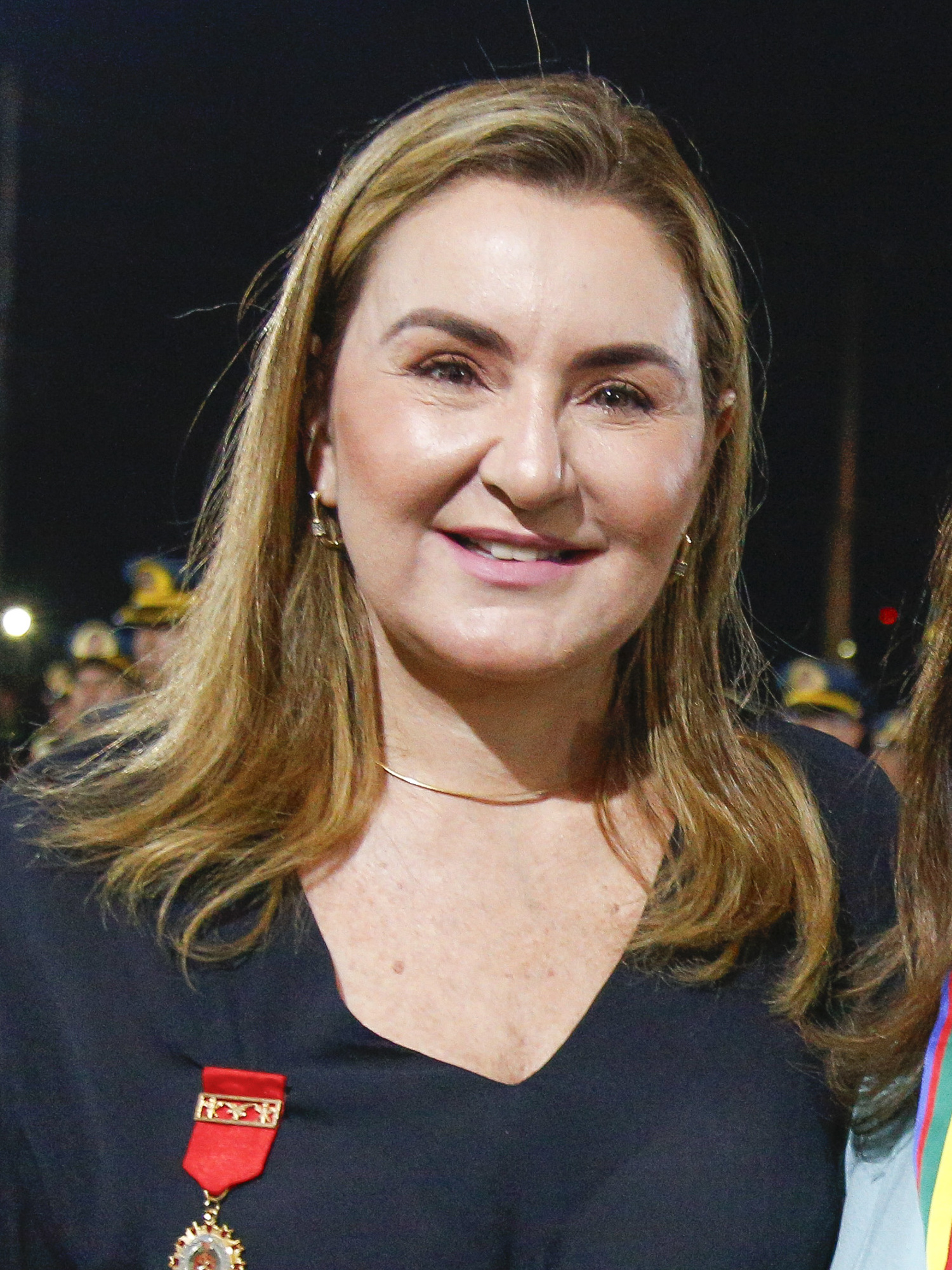
- Ghassan in 2023

Governor of Pará
- Incumbent
- Assumed office 2 April 2026
- Preceded by: Helder Barbalho

Vice Governor of Pará
- In office 1 January 2023 – 2 April 2026
- Governor: Helder Barbalho
- Preceded by: Lúcio Vale

Personal details
- Born: 16 January 1968 (age 58) Belém, Pará, Brazil
- Party: Brazilian Democratic Movement

Hana Ghassan Tuma (born 16 January 1968) is a Brazilian politician serving as vice governor of Pará since 2023. She served as secretary of planning and administration of Pará from 2019 to 2022 and from January to August 2025.

== Biography ==
=== Early life and education ===
Hanna Ghassan was born in 1968 in Belém, the capital of the state of Pará. She is married to Dr. José Roberto Tuma. She holds a degree in Accounting from the Federal University of Pará (UFPA).

=== political career ===
She has also served as the Municipal Secretary of Planning, Budget, and Finance and as the Municipal Secretary of Health and Infrastructure for the municipality of Ananindeua, as well as the Municipal Secretary of Finance for the municipality of Belém. In January 2019, she was appointed Secretary of Planning and Management (Seplad), a position she held until March 2022, when she was succeeded by Evanildo Ledo. In August of that same year, Governor Helder Barbalho confirmed her as his running mate for his re-election campaign.

She was elected Vice Governor of Pará on Helder Barbalho's ticket in the first round, securing 70% of the valid votes, and was one of six women elected as vice governor in Brazil in 2022.In early 2025, Ghassan resumed leadership of the Secretariat of Planning and Management, which remained under the administration of Governor Helder Barbalho. On April 2, 2026, following Barbalho's resignation to run for the Senate, she was sworn in as the new state governor. Hanna is the second woman to lead the executive branch in Pará since Ana Júlia Carepa; she is also the first female civil servant to attain this position and the second vice governor—following Carlos Santos (PP)—to become the head of the state of Pará.
