= Legislative Assembly of Pará =

Legislative assembly of the state of Pará, Brazil

Coordinates: 1°27′22″S 48°30′14″W

Legislative Assembly of the State of Pará Assembleia Legislativa do Estado do Pará
- 61st legislature

Type
- Type: Unicameral

Leadership
- President: Chicão Melo, MDB since 1 February 2021
- 1st VP: Luth Rebelo, PP
- Government Leader: Cilene Couto, PSDB

Structure
- Seats: 41 deputies
- Political groups: MDB (15) PT (4) PP (3) PSDB (3) PSD (3) Republicans (3) PDT (2) PL (2) Avante (1) Podemos (1) PRD (1) PSB (1) PSOL (1) UNIÃO (1)

Elections
- Voting system: Proportional representation
- Last election: 2 October 2022
- Next election: 2026

Meeting place
- Palácio Cabanagem, Belém

Website
- www.alepa.pa.gov.br

The Legislative Assembly of the State of Pará (Portuguese: Assembleia Legislativa do Estado do Pará) is the unicameral legislature of Pará state in Brazil. It has 41 state deputies elected by proportional representation.

The first legislature began on March 13, 1885, in a palace where today is the Square Dom Pedro II (destroyed by a fire in 1959), it was moved in 1960 to the Teatro da Paz and in 1970 to the current headquarters, the Palácio Cabanagem.
