= Federal Senate (Brazil) =

Upper house of the Brazilian National Congress

Coordinates: 15°47′59″S 47°51′51″W

Federal Senate Senado Federal
- 57th Legislature of the National Congress
- Logo

- Flag

Type
- Type: Upper house of the National Congress of Brazil
- Term limits: None

History
- Founded: 6 May 1826
- New session started: 2 February 2026

Leadership
- President: Davi Alcolumbre, UNIÃO since 1 February 2025
- Government Leader: Teresa Leitão, PT since 25 June 2026
- Majority Leader: Veneziano Vital do Rêgo, MDB since 19 February 2025
- Opposition Leader: Rogério Marinho, PL since 18 October 2024
- Minority Leader: Ciro Nogueira, PP since 7 February 2023
- Female Caucus Leader: Dorinha Rezende, UNIÃO since 9 July 2025

Structure
- Seats: 81
- Political groups: Outgoing legislature Government (40): PSD (14); PT (9); MDB (9); PSB (7); PDT (1); Opposition (23): PL (15); PSDB (4); Podemos (3); Avante (1); Independent (17): PP (8); Republicans (6); UNIÃO (3); No party (1)
- Political groups: Incoming legislature: PL (28); UPB (11) (Note: UNIÃO (5); PP (6)); PT (10); MDB (8); Republicans (6); PSD (4); PSB (4); NOVO (3); PSDB (2); Podemos (2); REDE (1); PDT (1); Independent (1)
- Length of term: 8 years
- Salary: R$ 33,763.00 (and benefits)

Elections
- Voting system: Plurality voting, alternating every four years between single-member elections (FPTP) and dual-member elections (block voting)
- Last election: 4 October 2026
- Next election: October 2030

Meeting place
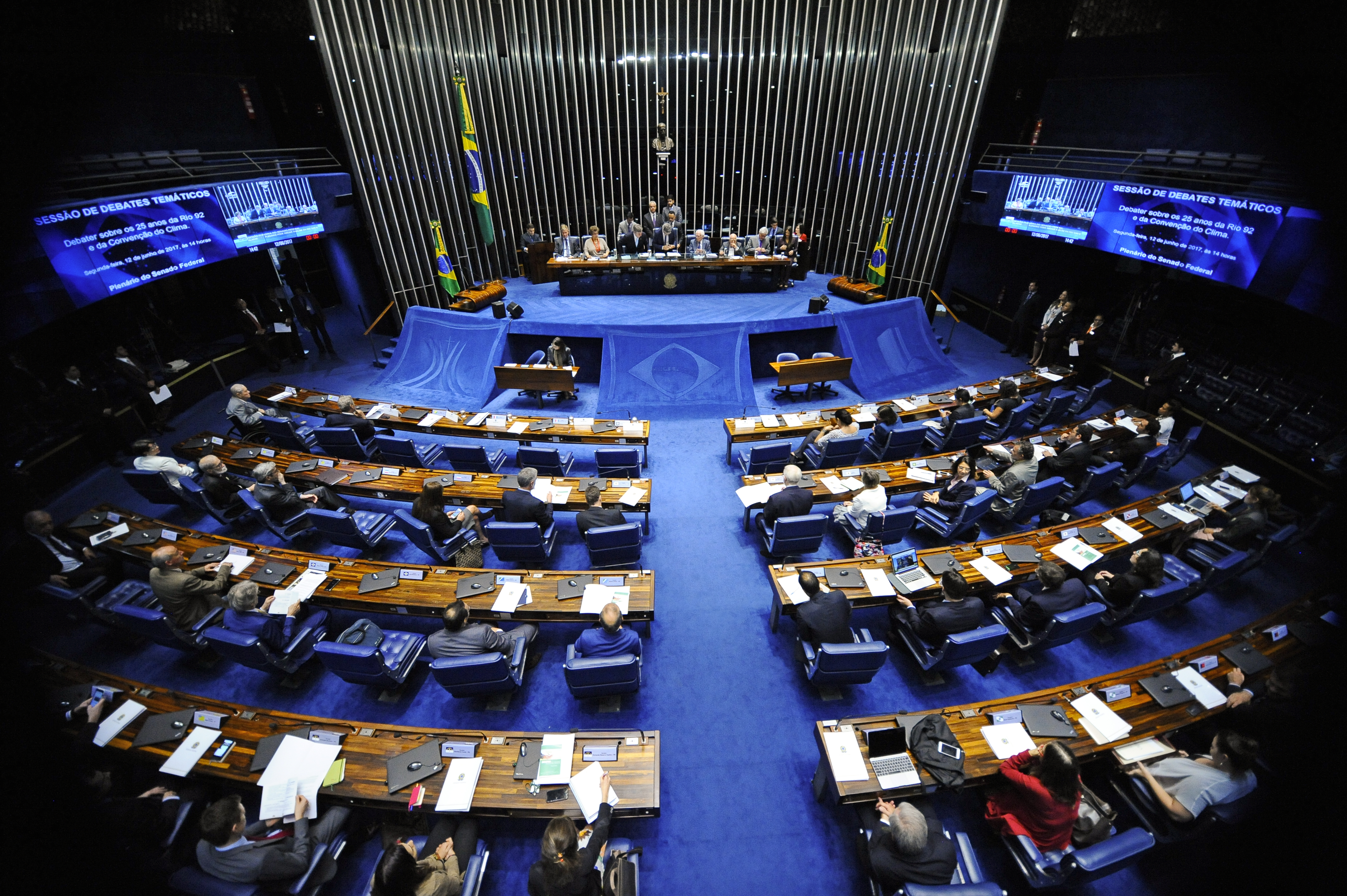
- Senate plenary chamber National Congress Palace; Brasília, Federal District, Brazil

Website
- www.senado.leg.br

The Federal Senate (Portuguese: Senado Federal) is the upper house of the National Congress of Brazil. When created under the Imperial Constitution in 1824, it was based on the House of Lords of the British Parliament, but since the Proclamation of the Republic in 1889 and under the first republican Constitution the Federal Senate has resembled the United States Senate.

The current president of the Federal Senate is Davi Alcolumbre, a member of UNIÃO from Amapá. He was re-elected in February 2025 for his two-year non-consecutive term, as he had already led the Senate between 2019-21 during the presidency of Jair Bolsonaro.

== Membership ==
The Senate has 81 members, serving an eight-year term of office. There are three senators from each of the country's 27 federal units, the Federal District and the 26 states. Elections are staggered so that either one-third or two-thirds of senators in each federal unit are up for election every four years. The most recent election took place in 2022, where one-third of the Senate was elected.

Elections are held under the first-past-the-post and block voting systems. In years when a third of members are up for election, voters can cast only one vote and the candidate who receives a plurality of votes within their state is elected. In years when two-thirds of members are up for election, voters can cast two votes. People can not vote for the same candidate twice, but each party can field up to two candidates in each state. The two highest-placed candidates in each state are elected.

== History ==
Following Brazil's independence, in 1822, Emperor Pedro I summoned the Legislative and Constituent General Assembly to draft the country's first Constitution. After several disagreements with the elected constituent deputies (which included representatives from present-day Uruguay, then a province of the Brazilian Empire) over the Emperor's role, he dissolved the Assembly in November 1823 and tasked his Council of State with drafting a new Constitution. The following year, he issued Brazil's first Constitution, which established the General Assembly as the country's legislative branch, with the Chamber of Deputies as the lower house, and the Senate as the upper house.

The Imperial Senate was modelled on the House of Lords of the British Parliament. It had 50 members, who served for life and represented the Empire's provinces, each with a number of senators proportional to their population. In addition to these elected senators, daughters and sons of the Emperor aged at least 25 were senators by right.

The elected members of the Senate had to be at least 40 years old and have an annual income of 800,000 contos-de-réis, which limited candidates to wealthy citizens and the landed aristocracy. Voters also faced an income qualification. Voting in an election for the Senate was limited to male citizens with an annual income of at least 200,000 contos-de-réis. Those who qualified for this did not vote directly for senators; instead, they voted for candidates to be Senate electors. To be a Senate elector required an annual income of 400,000 contos-de-réis. Once elected, these electors would then vote for senators. The election itself would not result in a winner automatically. The three candidates receiving the most votes would make up what was called a triple list, from which the Emperor would select one individual that would be considered elected. The Emperor usually chose the candidate with the most votes, but it was within his constitutional discretion to select whichever of the three individuals listed.

Following the adoption of the 1824 Constitution, the first session of the Senate took place in May 1826. The Emperor had repeatedly delayed calling the first election, which had led to accusations that he would attempt to establish an absolutist government.

The Proclamation of the Republic in 1889 ended the Brazilian Empire in favor of the First Republic. The 1891 Constitution was then adopted, transforming Brazil's provinces into states and removing the Senate's life tenure. This was retained under later constitutions, including the current 1988 Constitution. Now known as the Federal Senate, it resembles the United States Senate in that each state has the same number of senators.

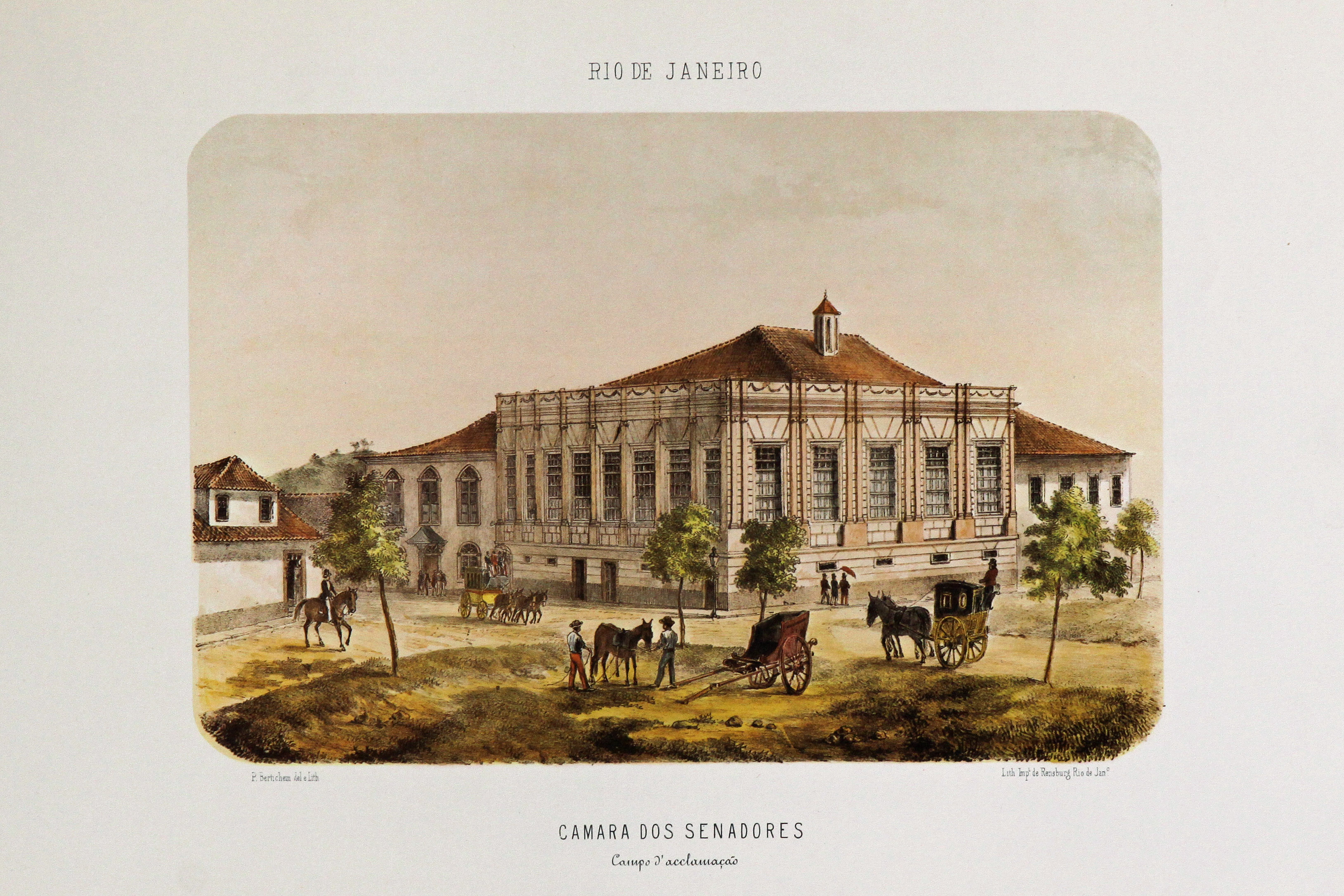
Palácio Conde dos Arcos, seat of the Imperial Senate in Rio de Janeiro, then Brazil's capital.

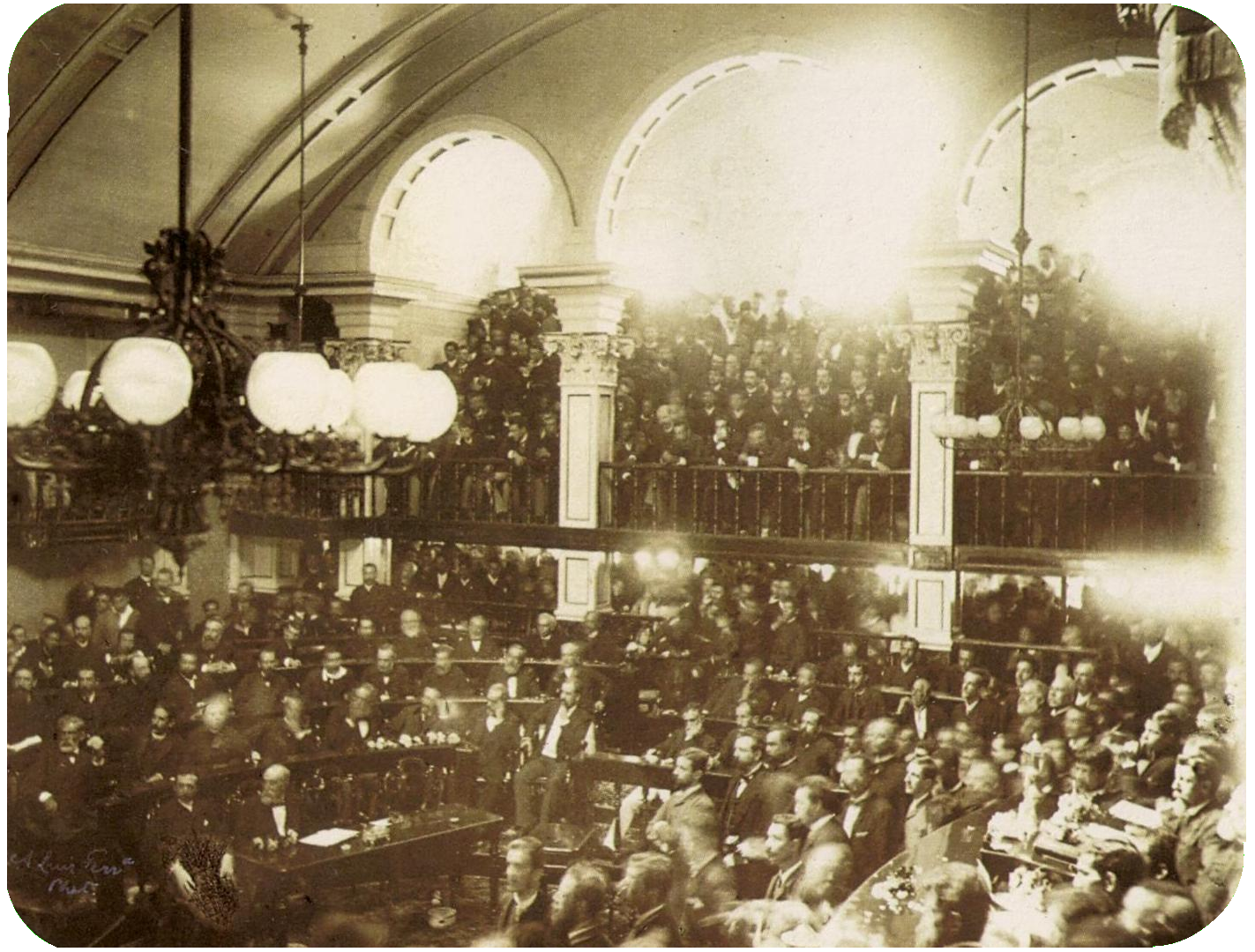
The Imperial Senate in session, 1888

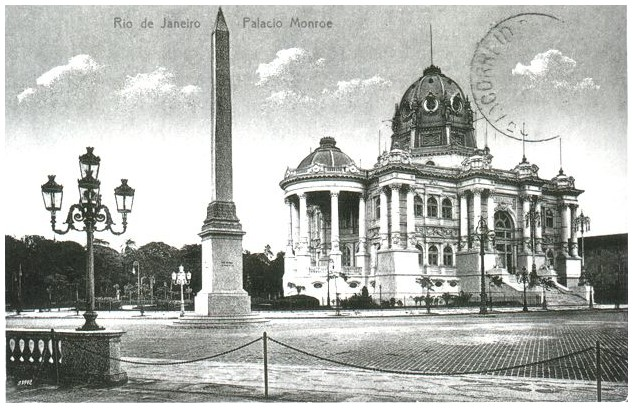
Palácio Monroe, second seat of the Senate.

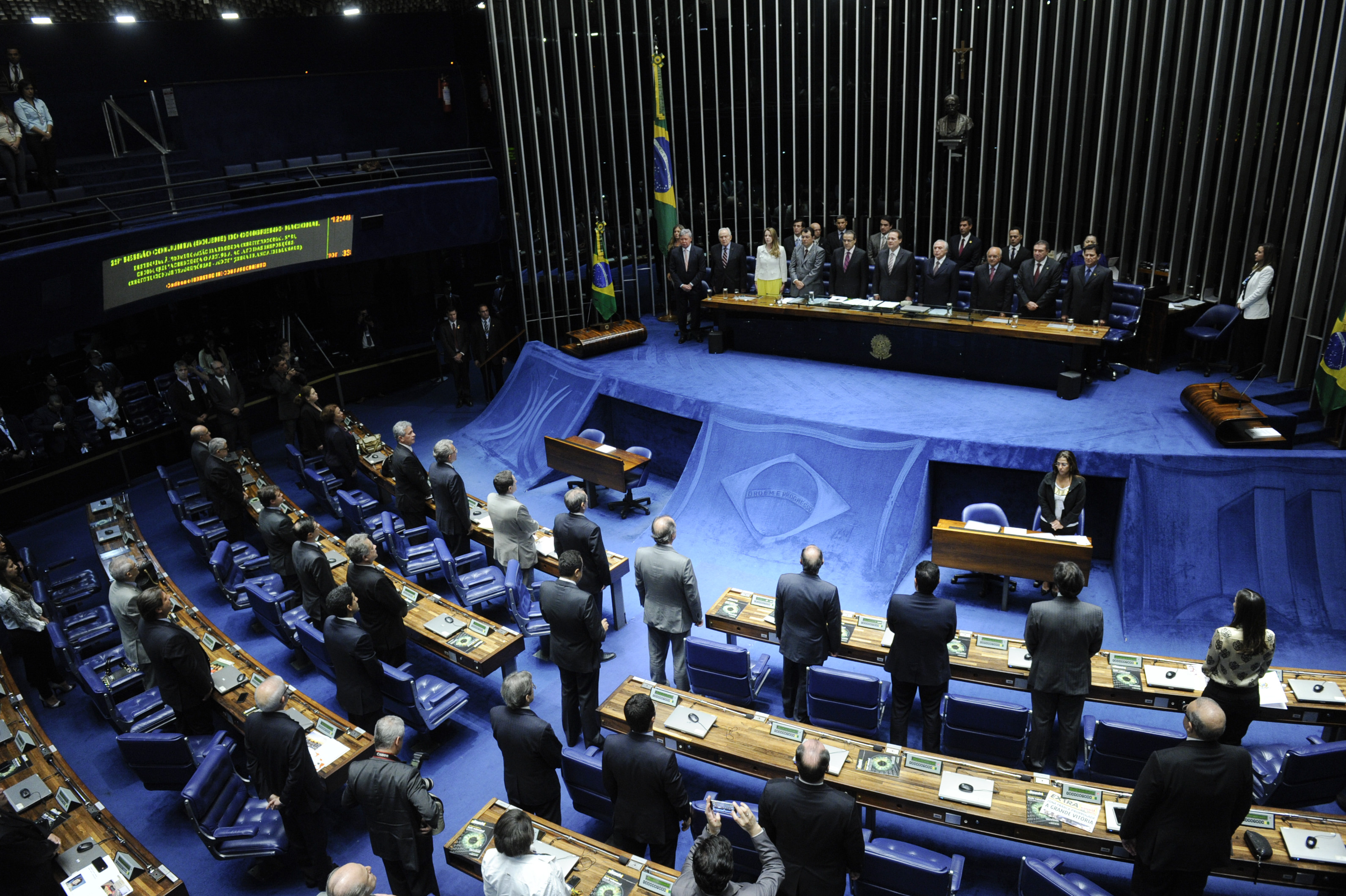
The Federal Senate in the National Congress building in Brasília, capital city of Brazil since 1960.

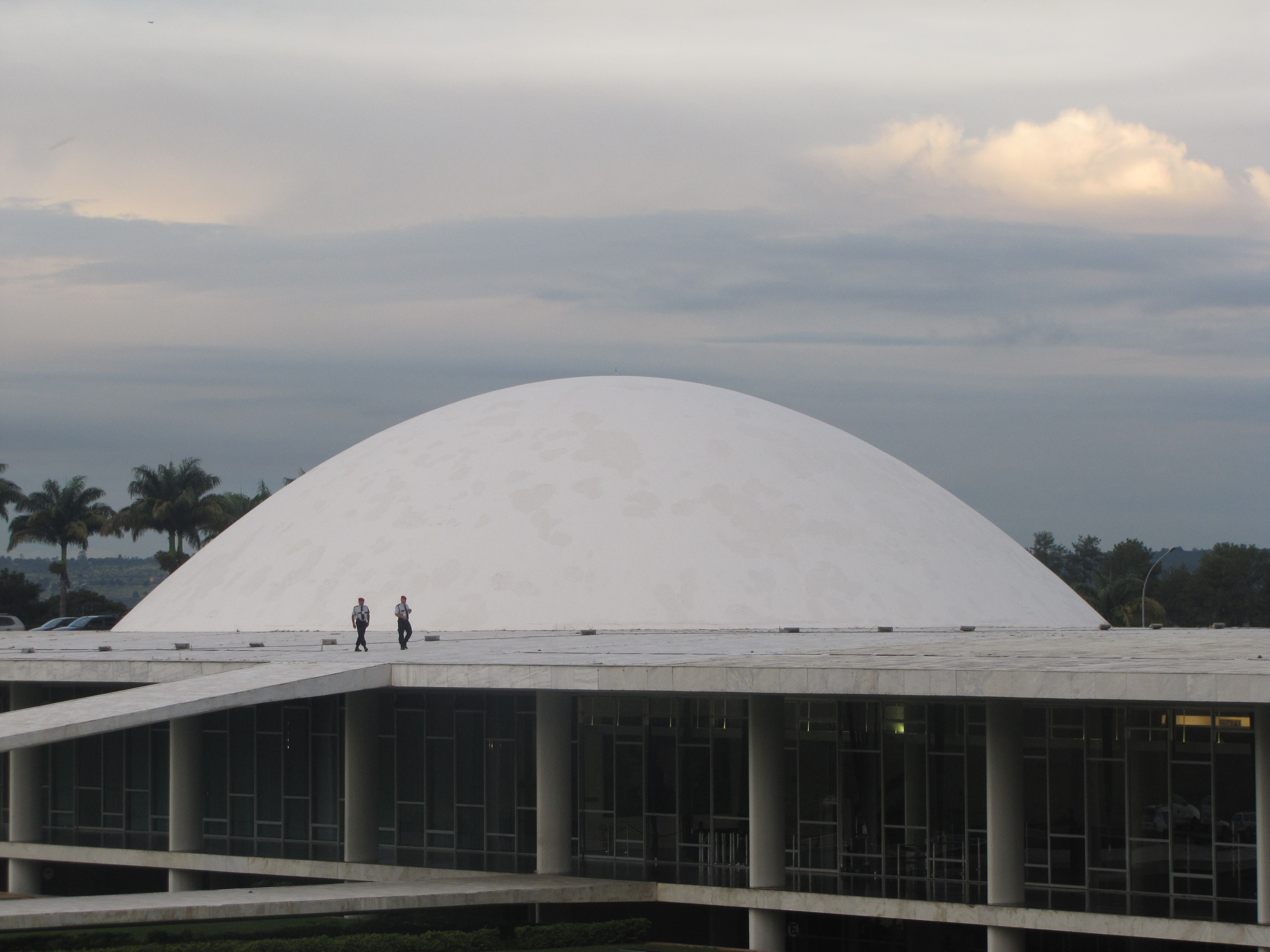
Exterior view of the Senate chamber.

== Presiding Board ==
The current composition of the Mesa Diretora (Presiding Board) of the Federal Senate is as follows:

Office	Portrait	Name	Party	State
President		Davi Alcolumbre	UNIÃO	Amapá
1st Vice-President		Eduardo Gomes	PL	Tocantins
2nd Vice-President		Humberto Costa	PT	Pernambuco
1st Secretary		Daniella Ribeiro	PP	Paraíba
2nd Secretary		Confúcio Moura	MDB	Rondônia
3rd Secretary		Ana Paula Lobato	PSB	Maranhão
4th Secretary		Laercio Oliveira	PP	Sergipe
1st Substitute		Chico Rodrigues	PSB	Roraima
2nd Substitute		Roberta Acioly	Republicanos	Roraima
3rd Substitute		Styvenson Valentim	PODE	Rio Grande do Norte
4th Substitute		Soraya Thronicke	PSB	Mato Grosso do Sul

== Party composition ==
The current party composition of the Senate (57th Legislature) is as follows:

Parties and party leaders in the 57th Federal Senate
Party	Seats	Floor leader	Portrait
Liberal Party	15	Carlos Portinho	
Social Democratic Party	14	Omar Aziz	
Workers' Party	9	Camilo Santana	
Brazilian Democratic Movement	9	Eduardo Braga	
Progressistas	8	Tereza Cristina	
Brazilian Socialist Party	6	Cid Gomes	
Republicans	6	Alan Rick	
Brazilian Social Democracy Party	4	Plínio Valério	
Podemos	3	Alexandre Giordano	
Brazil Union	3	Dorinha Rezende	
Democratic Labour Party	2	Weverton Rocha	
Avante	1	Marcos do Val	

== Current senators ==
State	Portrait	Senator	Party	Born	Assumed office	Birthplace
Acre		Alan Rick	Republicans	23 October 1976 (age 50)	1 February 2023	Rio Branco
Acre		Márcio Bittar	PL	28 June 1963 (age 63)	1 February 2019	Franca
Acre		Sérgio Petecão	PSD	20 April 1960 (age 66)	1 February 2011	Rio Branco
Alagoas		Eudócia Caldas	PSDB	28 August 1964 (age 62)	30 December 2024	Ibateguara
Alagoas		Renan Calheiros	MDB	16 September 1955 (age 71)	1 February 1995	Murici
Alagoas		Renan Filho	MDB	8 October 1979 (age 47)	1 February 2023	Murici
Amazonas		Eduardo Braga	MDB	12 June 1960 (age 66)	1 February 2011	Belém
Amazonas		Omar Aziz	PSD	13 August 1958 (age 68)	1 February 2015	Garça
Amazonas		Plínio Valério	PSDB	31 January 1955 (age 71)	1 February 2019	Eirunepé
Amapá		Davi Alcolumbre	UNIÃO	19 June 1977 (age 49)	1 February 2015	Macapá
Amapá		Lucas Barreto	PSD	10 November 1964 (age 61)	1 February 2019	Macapá
Amapá		Randolfe Rodrigues	PT	6 November 1972 (age 53)	1 February 2011	Garanhuns
Bahia		Angelo Coronel	Republicans	3 May 1958 (age 68)	1 February 2019	Coração de Maria
Bahia		Jaques Wagner	PT	16 March 1951 (age 75)	1 February 2019	Rio de Janeiro
Bahia		Otto Alencar	PSD	28 August 1947 (age 79)	1 February 2015	Ruy Barbosa
Ceará		Camilo Santana	PT	3 June 1968 (age 58)	1 February 2023	Crato
Ceará		Cid Gomes	PSB	27 April 1963 (age 63)	1 February 2019	Sobral
Ceará		Sargento Reginauro	PSDB	2 April 1973 (age 53)	11 August 2026	Fortaleza
Distrito Federal		Damares Alves	Republicans	11 March 1964 (age 62)	1 February 2023	Paranaguá
Distrito Federal		Izalci Lucas	PL	7 April 1956 (age 70)	1 February 2019	Araújos
Distrito Federal		Leany Lemos	PSB	6 April 1970 (age 56)	6 October 2026	Brasília
Espírito Santo		Fabiano Contarato	PT	20 June 1966 (age 60)	1 February 2019	Nova Venécia
Espírito Santo		Magno Malta	PL	16 October 1957 (age 69)	1 February 2023	Macarani
Espírito Santo		Marcos do Val	Avante	15 June 1971 (age 55)	1 February 2019	Vitória
Goiás		Jorge Kajuru	PSB	20 January 1961 (age 65)	1 February 2019	Cajuru
Goiás		Vanderlan Cardoso	PSD	15 November 1962 (age 63)	1 February 2019	Iporá
Goiás		Wilder Morais	PL	29 June 1968 (age 58)	1 February 2023	Taquaral
Maranhão		Eliziane Gama	PSD	27 February 1977 (age 49)	1 February 2019	Monção
Maranhão		Lourdinha Pereira	PSB	29 June 1956 (age 70)	5 August 2026	Coroatá
Maranhão		Weverton Rocha	PDT	8 October 1979 (age 47)	1 February 2019	Imperatriz
Minas Gerais		Carlos Viana	PSD	22 March 1963 (age 63)	1 February 2019	Braúnas
Minas Gerais		Cleitinho Azevedo	Republicans	15 April 1982 (age 44)	1 February 2023	Divinópolis
Minas Gerais		Renzo Braz	PP	11 April 1980 (age 46)	30 September 2026	Muriaé
Mato Grosso do Sul		Nelson Trad	PSD	5 September 1961 (age 65)	1 February 2019	Campo Grande
Mato Grosso do Sul		Soraya Thronicke	PSB	1 June 1973 (age 53)	1 February 2019	Dourados
Mato Grosso do Sul		Tereza Cristina	PP	6 July 1954 (age 72)	1 February 2023	Campo Grande
Mato Grosso		Carlos Fávaro	PSD	19 October 1969 (age 57)	1 February 2023	Bela Vista do Paraíso
Mato Grosso		Jayme Campos	UNIÃO	13 September 1951 (age 75)	1 February 2019	Várzea Grande
Mato Grosso		Wellington Fagundes	PL	1 June 1957 (age 69)	1 February 2015	Rondonópolis
Pará		Beto Faro	PT	20 June 1969 (age 57)	1 February 2023	Bujaru
Pará		Jader Barbalho	MDB	27 October 1944 (age 82)	28 December 2011	Belém
Pará		Zequinha Marinho	Podemos	18 September 1959 (age 67)	1 February 2019	Araguacema
Paraíba		Daniella Ribeiro	PP	26 March 1972 (age 54)	1 February 2019	Campina Grande
Paraíba		Efraim Filho	PL	18 March 1979 (age 47)	1 February 2023	João Pessoa
Paraíba		Veneziano Vital	MDB	17 July 1970 (age 56)	1 February 2019	Campina Grande
Pernambuco		Fernando Dueire	PSD	14 April 1959 (age 67)	7 December 2022	Recife
Pernambuco		Humberto Costa	PT	7 July 1957 (age 69)	1 February 2011	Campinas
Pernambuco		Teresa Leitão	PT	7 October 1951 (age 75)	1 February 2023	Recife
Piauí		Ciro Nogueira	PP	21 November 1968 (age 57)	30 December 2022	Teresina
Piauí		Jussara Lima	PSD	5 December 1960 (age 65)	14 December 2023	Fronteiras
Piauí		Marcelo Castro	MDB	9 June 1950 (age 76)	1 February 2019	São Raimundo Nonato
Paraná		Flávio Arns	PSB	9 November 1950 (age 75)	1 February 2019	Curitiba
Paraná		Oriovisto Guimarães	PSDB	12 August 1945 (age 81)	1 February 2019	Batatais
Paraná		Sergio Moro	PL	1 August 1972 (age 54)	1 February 2023	Maringá
Rio de Janeiro		Carlos Portinho	PL	2 July 1973 (age 53)	3 November 2020	Rio de Janeiro
Rio de Janeiro		Flávio Bolsonaro	PL	30 April 1981 (age 45)	1 February 2019	Resende
Rio de Janeiro		Romário	Independent	29 January 1966 (age 60)	1 February 2015	Rio de Janeiro
Rio Grande do Norte		Rogério Marinho	PL	26 November 1963 (age 62)	1 February 2023	Natal
Rio Grande do Norte		Styvenson Valentim	Podemos	7 February 1977 (age 49)	1 February 2019	Rio Branco
Rio Grande do Norte		Zenaide Maia	PSD	27 November 1954 (age 71)	1 February 2019	Brejo do Cruz
Rondônia		Confúcio Moura	MDB	16 May 1948 (age 78)	1 February 2019	Dianópolis
Rondônia		Jaime Bagattoli	PL	26 April 1961 (age 65)	1 February 2023	Presidente Getúlio
Rondônia		Marcos Rogério	PL	7 July 1978 (age 48)	1 February 2019	Ji-Paraná
Roraima		Chico Rodrigues	PSB	23 April 1951 (age 75)	1 February 2019	Recife
Roraima		Hiran Gonçalves	PP	19 June 1957 (age 69)	1 February 2023	Tefé
Roraima		Roberta Acioly	Republicans	19 October 1978 (age 48)	11 March 2026	Santo André
Rio Grande do Sul		Hamilton Mourão	Republicans	15 August 1953 (age 73)	1 February 2023	Porto Alegre
Rio Grande do Sul		Luis Carlos Heinze	PP	14 September 1950 (age 76)	1 February 2019	Candelária
Rio Grande do Sul		Paulo Paim	PT	15 March 1950 (age 76)	1 February 2003	Caxias do Sul
Santa Catarina		Esperidião Amin	PP	21 December 1947 (age 78)	1 February 2019	Florianópolis
Santa Catarina		Ivete da Silveira	MDB	28 May 1943 (age 83)	30 December 2022	Brusque
Santa Catarina		Jorge Seif	PL	10 May 1977 (age 49)	1 February 2023	Rio de Janeiro
Sergipe		Alessandro Vieira	MDB	3 April 1975 (age 51)	1 February 2019	Passo Fundo
Sergipe		Laércio Oliveira	PP	15 April 1959 (age 67)	1 February 2023	Recife
Sergipe		Rogério Carvalho	PT	2 August 1968 (age 58)	1 February 2019	Aracaju
São Paulo		Marcos Pontes	PL	11 March 1963 (age 63)	1 February 2023	Bauru
São Paulo		Alexandre Giordano	Podemos	26 June 1973 (age 53)	31 March 2021	São Paulo
São Paulo		Mara Gabrilli	PSD	28 September 1967 (age 59)	1 February 2019	São Paulo
Tocantins		Eduardo Gomes	PL	28 April 1966 (age 60)	1 February 2019	Estância
Tocantins		Irajá Abreu	PSD	3 February 1983 (age 43)	1 February 2019	Goiânia
Tocantins		Dorinha Rezende	UNIÃO	1 October 1964 (age 62)	1 February 2023	Goiânia

== Standing committees ==
Committee	Chair	Source
Economic Affairs	Renan Calheiros	
Social Affairs	Marcelo Castro	
Communication and Digital Law	TBA	
Constitution, Justice and Citizenship	Otto Alencar	
Science, Technology, Innovation and Informatics	Flávio Arns	
Defense of Democracy	TBA	
Human Rights and Participatory Legislation	Damares Alves	
Directing Board	Davi Alcolumbre	
Regional Development and Tourism	Dorinha Rezende	
Education and Culture	Camilo Santana	
Sports	TBA	
Infrastructure Services	Marcos Rogério	
Environment	Fabiano Contarato	
Agriculture and Agrarian Reform	Zequinha Marinho	
Foreign Affairs and National Defense	Nelson Trad	
Public Security	Flávio Bolsonaro	
Transparency, Governance, Oversight and Control, and Consumer Protection	Hiran Gonçalves	

== See also ==
- Federal institutions of Brazil
- Portal e-Cidadania
- TV Senado
- Evangelical Parliamentary Front
