= LGBTQ rights in Rondônia =

LGBTQ Reform act of Rondônia

- Location of Rondônia in Brazil.
- Legal status: Legal since 1830, age of consent equalised
- Gender identity: Gender change allowed, official standard for altering legal sex doesn't require surgery since 2018
- Military: Allowed to serve openly
- Discrimination protections: Since 2019

Family rights
- Recognition of relationships: Same-sex marriage since 2013
- Adoption: Legal since 2010

Lesbian, gay, bisexual, transgender and queer (LGBTQ) people in the Brazilian state of Rondônia enjoy many of the same legal protections available to non-LGBTQ people. Homosexuality is legal in the state, as well as throughout Brazil since 1830.

== Legality ==
In 1830, Brazilian Emperor Pedro I sanctioned the Imperial Penal Code, removing all references to sodomy from Brazilian law.

On 26 April 2013, the General Inspectorate of Justice of the state of Rondônia published in the Diário da Justiça Eletrônico Provision 008/2013-CG which provides for the direct qualification for marriage between same-sex and conversion of stable in marriage in the civil registration records of the State of Rondônia.

== Discrimination protections ==
Rondônia has no specific laws prohibiting discrimination based on sexual orientation or gender identity. However, since 2019, both types of discrimination have been criminalized by a ruling by the Brazilian Supreme Federal Court, which equates them with the already existing crime of racism under Brazilian law.

In 2025, the Federal Public Prosecutor's Office (MPF), the Public Prosecutor's Office of the State of Rondônia (MPRO), the Public Prosecutor's Office of Labor (MPT), the Public Defender's Office of the Union (DPU), and the Public Defender's Office of the State of Rondônia (DPE-RO) signed a document recommending measures to protect the LGBTQ community, such as training on sexual orientation and gender identity for police officers and firefighters and the inclusion of data on the LGBTQ population of Rondônia in official reports.

== Gender identity and expression ==
The Supreme Federal Court of Brazil ruled on 1 March 2018, that a transgender person has the right to change their official name and sex without the need of surgery or professional evaluation, just by self-declaration of their psychosocial identity.

In July 2022, Hanier Miranda became the first person in the state to obtain a birth certificate with a sex marker "X". Initially, an attempt to rectify directly at the registry office was denied because there was no regulated procedure in the state for a third gender option. After a year-long lawsuit filed by the Center for Legal Practices, Research and Extensions (NPPEJ) at the Catholic Faculty of Porto Velho, Hanier managed to rectify their documents with the sex marker "X".

On 28 August 2025, Appellate Judge Daniel Ribeiro Lagos signed an ordinance that guarantees transgender people the use of their social name and the use of bathrooms and locker rooms in accordance with their gender identity.

== Censorship ==
In October 2021, the Legislative Assembly of Rondônia approved State Law no. 5,123, proposed by Deputy Eyder Brasil of the Social Liberal Party, which bans the use of gender-neutral language in schools. The bill was signed into law by the Governor of Rondônia, Marcos Rocha, on the 19th.

The National Confederation of Workers in Educational Establishments filed an ADI (Direct Action of Unconstitutionality) with the Supreme Federal Court (STF) to struck down the law. Justice Edson Fachin blocked the enforcement of the law in November 2021 through a preliminary injunction, claiming that "a state law that, under the pretext of protecting students, prohibits a particular form of use of the Portuguese language violates the legislative authority of the Federal Government". On February 10, 2023, the Supreme Court decided to uphold Fachin's decision and struck down the state law.

On July 10, 2026, the Legislative Assembly passed a law requiring parental authorization to decide whether students may attend classes on sexual orientation, sexual diversity, gender identity, and gender equality. As Governor Marcos Rocha neither vetoed nor signed the bill, it was enacted by the Assembly President, Alex Redano. The law was struck down by the Court of Justice of Rondônia on August 17.

== Life conditions ==
=== Advocacy ===
In June 2019, the Rondônia Section of the Brazilian Bar Association (OAB), through the Human Rights Defense Commission (CDDH), and the Public Defender's Office of the State of Rondônia held the LGBT Pride Seminar (Brazilian Portuguese: Seminário de Orgulho LGBT) in Porto Velho, the state capital, discussing issues such as corrective rape, lesbophobia, toxic masculinity and the criminalization of transphobia in the country.

In 2023, Lauri Miranda Silva, born in Porto Velho, became the first trans woman in Brazil to receive a doctorate in History through her thesis "Subversive voices and transgressive bodies: memory of the (re) existence of LGBTQIA+ movement activists and intersectional women against oppression in Rondônia (1980 to 2022)".

=== Police reports ===
Between 2017 and 2021, there were 12 murders of transgender people in the state, according to a report by the National Association of Travestis and Transsexuals (ANTRA), published on January 28, 2022. According to this report, Rondônia is the 3rd state with the highest homicide rate in the North Region of Brazil.

Between 2020 and 2021, 240 police reports of violence against LGBTQ people were recorded.

In 2022, Rondônia was named the worst Brazilian state in terms of public policies for the LGBTQ community, according to the Programa Atenas.

== Summary table ==
Same-sex sexual activity legal	Yes (Since 1830)
Equal age of consent	Yes (Since 1830)
Anti-discrimination laws in employment only	Yes (Since 2019)
Anti-discrimination laws in the provision of goods and services	Yes (Since 2019)
Anti-discrimination laws in all other areas (Incl. indirect discrimination, hate speech)	Yes (Since 2019)
Transgender people allowed to use restrooms and other gender-segregated spaces that correspond with their gender identity	Yes (Since 2025)
Same-sex marriages	Yes (Since 2013)
Recognition of same-sex couples	Yes (Since 2011)
Stepchild adoption by same-sex couples	Yes (Since 2010)
Joint adoption by same-sex couples	Yes (Since 2010)
LGBTQ people allowed to serve openly in the military	Yes
Right to change legal gender	Yes (Since 2008; gender self-identification since 2018)
Third gender option	Yes / No (Only in a specific case)
Conversion therapy by medical professionals banned	Yes (Since 1999 for homosexuals and since 2018 for transgender people)
Access to IVF for lesbians	Yes (Since 2013)
Commercial surrogacy for gay male couples	No (Banned for any couple regardless of sexual orientation)
MSMs allowed to donate blood	Yes (Since 2020)

== See also ==
- Lauri Miranda Silva
