= Rodrigo Camargo =

Brazilian politician (born 1981)

- Camargo in 2025

Vice Governor of Rondônia
- Assuming office 6 January 2027
- Governor: Marcos Rogério
- Succeeding: Sérgio Gonçalves

Personal details
- Born: 24 February 1981 (age 45)
- Party: Podemos

Rodrigo Camargo Ribeiro Pinho (born 24 February 1981) is a Brazilian politician who was elected vice governor of Rondônia in 2026. He has been a member of the Legislative Assembly of Rondônia since 2023.
