= Ângelo Angelin =

Brazilian politician (1935–2017)

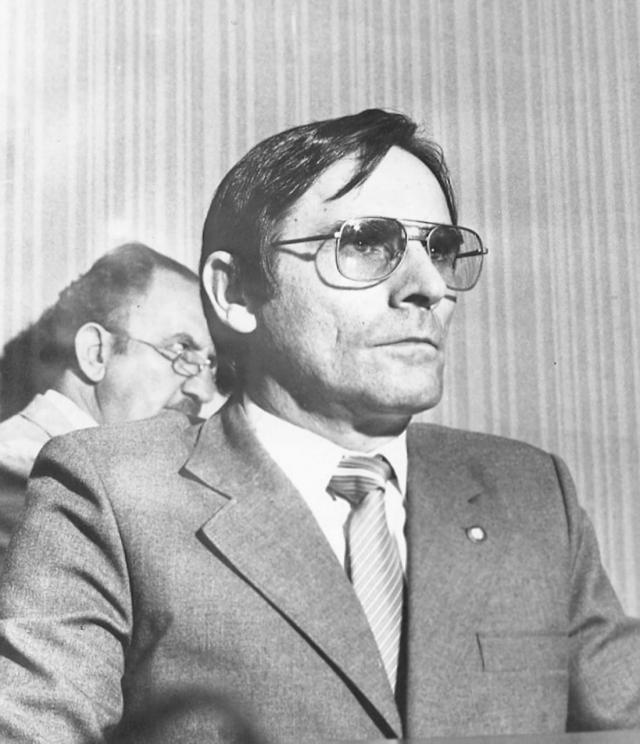

2nd Governor of Rondônia
- In office May 13, 1985 – March 15, 1987
- Preceded by: Jorge Teixeira de Oliveira
- Succeeded by: Jerônimo Garcia de Santana

Member of the Legislative Assembly of Rondônia
- In office 1983–1985

Personal details
- Born: January 21, 1935 Capivari, São Paulo
- Died: July 3, 2017 (aged 82) Cuiabá, Mato Grosso
- Party: PMDB
- Spouse: Elisabete Ansilieiro (?–2017; his death)

Ângelo Angelin (January 21, 1935 – July 3, 2017) was a Brazilian academic and politician who served as the second Governor of the state of Rondônia from May 13, 1985, until March 15, 1987. Angelin, who held the state governorship during Brazil's transition from military rule to democracy, was the last appointed Governor of Rondônia before the introduction of direct elections for the office in 1987. Angelin was known as a strong supporter of Rondônia's municipal governments during his two-year term.

Angelin was serving in the Legislative Assembly of Rondônia when he was appointed Governor of Rondônia by Brazilian President José Sarney in 1985 during the country's transition to civilian rule.

Angelin's successor, Jerônimo Garcia de Santana, who took office in March 1987, was the first directly elected Governor of Rondônia.

Angelin died from complications of diverticulitis at the Hospital Santa Rosa in Cuiabá, Mato Grosso, on July 3, 2017, at the age 82. He had been hospitalized at Santa Rosa since June 18. The Governor of Rondônia, Confúcio Moura, declared three days of official mourning following Angelin's death. He was buried in his hometown of Cuiabá, Mato Grosso.
