= Marcos Rogério (politician) =

Brazilian politician

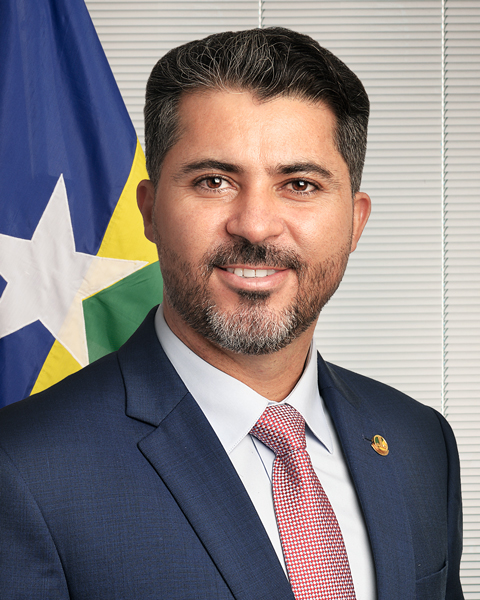
- Official portrait, 2023

Governor-elect of Rondônia
- Assuming office 6 January 2027
- Vice Governor: Rodrigo Camargo (elect)
- Succeeding: Marcos Rocha

Senator for Rondônia
- Incumbent
- Assumed office 1 February 2011

Member of the Chamber of Deputies
- In office 17 November 2011 – 1 February 2019
- Constituency: Rondônia

Councillor of Ji-Paraná
- In office 1 January 2009 – 17 November 2011
- Constituency: At-large

Personal details
- Born: Marcos Rogério da Silva Brito; 7 July 1978 (age 48) Ji-Paraná, Rondônia, Brazil
- Party: PL (2022–present)
- Other political affiliations: PDT (2007–2016); DEM (2016–2022)
- Profession: Journalist, radio host

Marcos Rogério da Silva Brito (born 7 July 1978) is a Brazilian politician who is the governor-elect of Rondônia. He previously served in the Chamber of Deputies from 2011 to 2019.

== Personal life ==
Marcos Rogério was born to Samuel Lopes de Brito and Maria Cecilia da Silva. Prior to becoming a politician, Marcos Rogério worked as a journalist for Rede Globo. He is a graduate of Universidade Luterana do Brasil. Marcos Rogério is an Evangelical Christian, and belongs to the Pentecostal denomination Assembleias de Deus.

== Political career ==
Marcos Rogério voted in favor of the impeachment motion of then-president Dilma Rousseff. He would later vote in favor of opening a similar corruption investigation against Rousseff's successor Michel Temer, and voted in favor of the 2017 Brazilian labor reforms.

In the 2018 Brazilian general election Marcos Rogério was elected to the federal senate with 324,939 votes. He was one of six new Evangelical members elected to the federal senate in that election.

Political offices
Preceded by Marcos Rocha	Governor of Rondônia; Taking office 2027	Elect
