= Ivo Cassol =

Brazilian politician

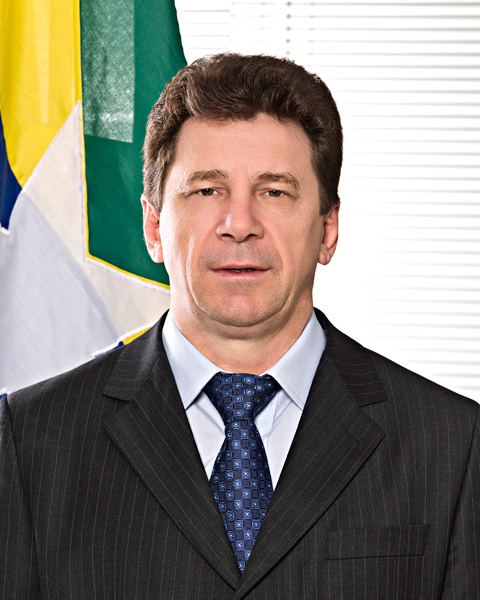

Senator from Rondônia
- Incumbent
- Assumed office February 1, 2011

Governor of Rondônia
- In office January 1, 2003 – March 31, 2010

Personal details
- Born: January 20, 1959 (age 67) Concórdia, Santa Catarina
- Party: Progressive Party

Ivo Cassol (born January 20, 1959) is a Brazilian politician. He has represented Rondônia in the Federal Senate since 2011. Previously, he was Governor of Rondônia from 2004 to 2010, when he resigned to seek election to the Senate. He is a member of the Progressive Party.
