= Dilvanda Faro =

Brazilian politician

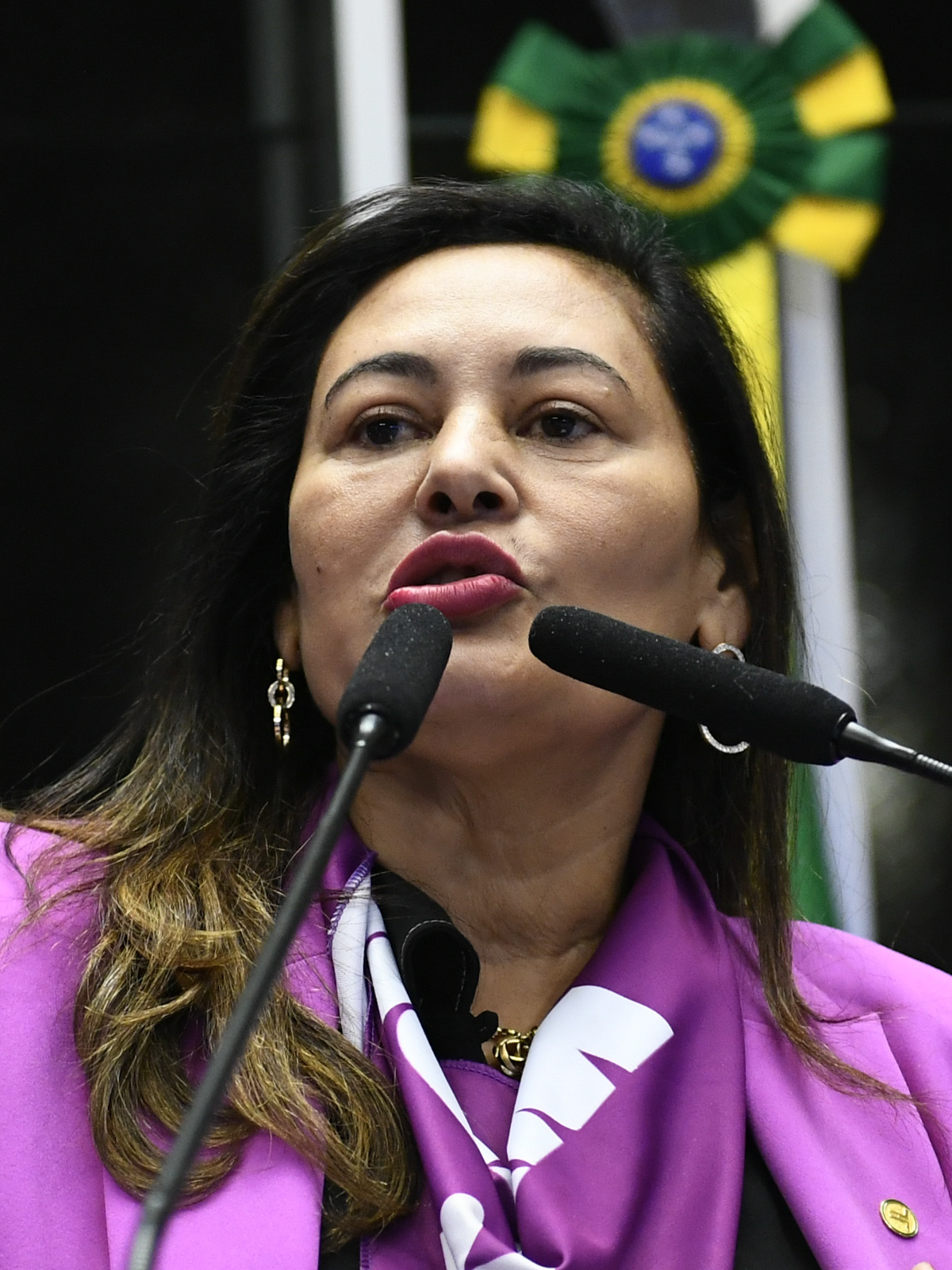

Federal deputy for Pará
- Incumbent
- Assumed office 1 February 2023

State deputy of Pará
- In office 1 February 2019 – 31 December 2022

Personal details
- Born: Dilvanda Furtado Faro; 8 May 1969 (age 57) Bujaru, Pará, Brazil
- Party: PT (1987–present)
- Spouse: Beto Faro

Dilvanda Furtado Faro (born 8 May 1969) is a Brazilian farmer, trade unionist and politician, having been a long-time affiliate of the Workers' Party (PT). She is currently a federal deputy for the state of Pará, having assumed office in 2023. She was previously a state deputy from 2019 to 2022. Her husband is federal senator Beto Faro.

Faro was born in Bujaru, the daughter of Raimundo Rodrigues Furtado and Elza Nascimento Furtado. She became involved in 1980s with left-wing Catholic youth movements while being a youth pastor. During this time period she became affiliated with the PT. She first ran for elected office to be the mayor of the town of Acará in both 2012 and 2016, but lost both times. She ran in 2018 as a state deputy in Pará and was elected with 43,796 votes. She later ran as a candidate for federal deputy, and was elected with 150,065 votes.

== Electoral history ==
	Year	Position	Votes	Result	Ref.
2012	Mayor of Acará	Mayor	10,001	Not elected	
2016	Mayor of Acará	Mayor	9,724	Not elected	
2018	Pará State Elections	State deputy	43,796	Elected	
2022	Pará State Elections	Federal deputy	150,065	Elected	
