= List of governors of Rondônia =

The governor of Rondônia is the head of government of the Brazilian state of Rondônia. Prior to becoming a state, Rondônia was a federal territory and was also governed by a governor.

The current governor is Marcos Rocha, who has been in office since 2019.

== List of governors ==
=== Federal Territory of Guaporé ===
The Federal Territory of Guaporé was created on 13 September 1943 from the states of Amazonas and Mato Grosso.

No.	Governor	Term in office	Party	Appointing President
1	Aluísio Ferreira (1897–1980)	1 November 1943 – 7 February 1946	_	_
2	Joaquim Rondon	7 February 1946 – 31 October 1947	PSD	Eurico Gaspar Dutra
3	Frederico Trotta	31 October 1947 – 9 June 1948	_	Eurico Gaspar Dutra
4	Joaquim de Araújo Lima	9 June 1948 – 22 February 1951	PSD	Eurico Gaspar Dutra
5	Petrônio Barcelos	22 February 1951 – 7 February 1952 (Note: One source gives the end of his governorship as 7 February 1952, whereas another says 7 May 1952.)	PTB	_
6	Jesus Burlamaqui Hosannah	7 February 1952 (Note: One source gives the start of his governorship as 6 February 1952, whereas another says 7 February.) – 18 November 1953	PTB	Getúlio Vargas
7	Ênio dos Santos Pinheiro	18 November 1953 (Note: One source gives the start of his governorship as 8 November 1953, whereas another says 18 November.) – 13 September 1954	PSD	Getúlio Vargas
8	Paulo Nunes Leal (1916–2003)	13 September 1954 (Note: One source gives the start of his governorship as 3 September 1954, whereas another says 13 September 1954.) – 5 April 1955	_	Café Filho
9	José Ribamar de Miranda (1901–1971)	5 April 1955 – 14 October 1956	PSD	Café Filho

=== Federal Territory of Rondônia ===
The Federal Territory of Guaporé was renamed to the Federal Territory of Rondônia on 17 February 1956 in honor of explorer Cândido Rondon.

No.	Governor	Term in office	Party	Appointing President
1	Jaime Araújo dos Santos	14 October 1956 – 6 November 1958	PSD	Juscelino Kubitschek
2	Paulo Nunes Leal	6 November 1958 – 18 March 1961 (Note: One source gives the end of his governorship as 8 September 1961, whereas another says 18 March 1961.)	_	Juscelino Kubitschek
3	Abelardo Mafra	18 March 1961 – 13 September 1961	PTN	_
4	Ênio dos Santos Pinheiro	13 September 1961 – 3 July 1962	PTB	_
5	Milton Lima	3 July 1962 – 12 December 1962	PTB	_
6	Wady Darwich Zacarias	12 December 1962 – 27 May 1963	PSD	_
7	Ari Marcos da Silva	27 May 1963 – 14 October 1963	_	João Goulart
8	Paulo Eugênio Pinto Guedes	14 October 1963 – 27 January 1964	PRP	_
9	Abelardo Mafra	27 January 1964 – 24 April 1964	PSD	_
10	José Manuel Luís da Cunha Menezes	24 April 1964 – 29 March 1965	PSD	Castelo Branco
11	João Carlos dos Santos Mader	29 March 1965 – 10 April 1967	ARENA	Castelo Branco
12	Flávio de Assunção Cardoso	10 April 1967 – 30 November 1967	_	Castelo Branco (Note: Source says that he was nominated by Castelo Branco despite Castelo Branco no longer being president on 10 April 1967.)
13	José Campedelli	30 November 1967 – 13 February 1969	_	_
14	João Carlos Marques Henrique Neto	13 February 1969 – 31 October 1972	_	_
15	Teodorico Gaíva	31 October 1972 – 23 April 1974	_	_
16	João Carlos Marques Henrique Neto	23 April 1974 – 20 May 1975	ARENA	Ernesto Geisel
17	Humberto da Silva Guedes	20 May 1975 – 2 April 1979	_	Ernesto Geisel
18	Jorge Teixeira	10 April 1979 – 4 January 1982	PDS	João Figueiredo

=== State of Rondônia ===
The state of Rondônia was created from the Federal Territory of Rondônia on 22 December 1981.

No.	Governor	Term in office	Vice-governor	Party	Election
1	Jorge Teixeira (1921–1987)	4 January 1982 – 10 May 1985	Janilene Vasconcelos de Melo	PDS	– (Note: Nominated by President João Figueiredo)
*	Janilene Vasconcelos de Melo (1948–)	3 January 1984 – 15 February 1984	Vacant	–	– (Note: De Melo served as interim governor while De Oliveira was away in Bolivia.)
2	Ângelo Angelin (1935–2017)	10 May 1985 – 15 March 1987	Vacant	PMDB	– (Note: Nominated by President José Sarney)
3	Jerônimo Santana (1934–2014)	15 March 1987 – 15 March 1991	Orestes Muniz	PMDB	1986
4	Osvaldo Piana Filho (1949–)	15 March 1991 – 1 January 1995	Assis Canuto	PTR	1990
4	Osvaldo Piana Filho (1949–)	15 March 1991 – 1 January 1995	Assis Canuto	PP	1990
5	Valdir Raupp (1955–)	1 January 1995 – 1 January 1999	Aparício Carvalho	PMDB	1994
6	José Bianco (1944–)	1 January 1999 – 1 January 2003	Miguel de Souza	PFL	1998
7	Ivo Cassol (1959–)	1 January 2003 – 31 March 2010	Odaisa Fernandes	PSDB	2002
7	Ivo Cassol (1959–)	1 January 2003 – 31 March 2010	João Cahulla	PPS	2006
8	João Cahulla (1954–)	31 March 2010 – 1 January 2011	Vacant	PPS	– (Note: Cahulla took office after Cassol renounced his governorship to run for senate.)
9	Confúcio Moura (1948–)	1 January 2011 – 5 April 2018	Airton Gurgacz	PMDB	2010
9	Confúcio Moura (1948–)	1 January 2011 – 5 April 2018	Daniel Pereira	PMDB	2014
10	Daniel Pereira (1965–)	5 April 2018 – 31 December 2018	Vacant	PSB	– (Note: Pereira took office after Moura renounced his governorship to run for senate.)
11	Marcos Rocha (1968–)	1 January 2019 – Incumbent	Zé Jodan	PSL	2018
11	Marcos Rocha (1968–)	1 January 2019 – Incumbent	Sérgio Gonçalves	UNIÃO	2022
