= Dorinha Rezende =

Brazilian politician

- Official portrait

Senator for Tocantins
- Incumbent
- Assumed office 1 February 2023

Member of the Chamber of Deputies
- In office 1 February 2011 – 1 February 2023
- Constituency: Tocantins

Personal details
- Born: Maria Auxiliadora Seabra Rezende; 1 October 1964 (age 62) Goiânia, Goiás, Brazil
- Party: UNIÃO (2022–present)
- Other political affiliations: PDS (1981–1985); PFL (1985–2007); DEM (2007–2022)

Maria Auxiliadora Seabra Rezende (born 1 October 1964) better known as Dorinha Rezende or Professora Dorinha is a Brazilian politician and university professor. Although born in Goiás, she has spent her political career representing Tocantins, having served as federal deputy representative since 2011.

== Personal life ==
Rezende was born to Antônio dos Santos Seabra and Maria Consuêlo Bastos. In addition to being a politician, Rezende is also a university professor.

== Political career ==
Rezende voted in favor of the impeachment of then-president Dilma Rousseff. Rezende voted against the 2015 tax reforms but in favor of the 2017 Brazilian labor reform, and would vote against the opening of a corruption investigation into Rousseff's successor Michel Temer.

=== Electoral history ===
Year	Election	Party	Office	Coalition	Partners	Party	Votes	Percent	Result
2010	State Elections of Tocantins	Federal Deputy	DEM	New Union of Tocantins (PRB, PTB, PTN, PSC, PR, DEM, PRTB, PMN, PV, PSDB)	—N/a		38,233	5.25%	Elected
2014	State Elections of Tocantins	Federal Deputy	DEM	The Change We See (PRB, PP, PDT, PTB, PSL, PSC, PR, PPS, DEM, PRTB, PHS, PTC, PSB, PRP, PSDB, PEN, SD)	—N/a		41,802	5.70%	Elected
2018	State Elections of Tocantins	Federal Deputy	DEM	Tocantins of Opportunities (PHS, AVANTE, PROS, DEM, PTC, PP, Solidariedade, Patriota, PRB)	—N/a		48,008	6.71%	Elected
2022	State Elections of Tocantins	Senator	UNIÃO	Union for Tocantins (PTB, PSC, PDT, UNIÃO, PSDB Cidadania Federation, Republicanos, Solidariedade)	Luciana Parizi	UNIÃO	395,408	50.42%	Elected
2022	State Elections of Tocantins	Senator	UNIÃO	Union for Tocantins (PTB, PSC, PDT, UNIÃO, PSDB Cidadania Federation, Republicanos, Solidariedade)	Mauricio Buffon	PTB	395,408	50.42%	Elected
