= Jerônimo Garcia de Santana =

Brazilian politician (1934–2014)

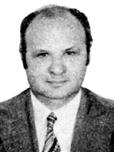

Governor of Rondônia
- In office March 15, 1987 – March 15, 1991
- Preceded by: Ângelo Angelin
- Succeeded by: Oswaldo Piana Filho

Personal details
- Born: October 29, 1934 Jataí, Jataí, Brazil
- Died: September 11, 2014 (aged 79) Rio de Janeiro, Brazil
- Party: Brazilian Democratic Movement Party

Jerônimo Garcia de Santana (October 29, 1934 – September 11, 2014) was a Brazilian politician and lawyer who served as the governor of Rondônia from 1987 until 1991. He was the first governor of Rondônia to be elected through direct election.

Jerônimo Garcia de Santana was elected as a member of the Chamber of Deputies in 1970, 1974 and 1978 as a member of the PMDB. He was elected mayor of Porto Velho on November 15, 1985, and sworn into office on January 1, 1986. He resigned from the mayoral office in May 1986 to run for governor in the 1986 Rondônia gubernatorial election.

Garcia de Santana attempted a political comeback in 1994, won the gubernatorial contest, becoming the first governor of Rondônia to be directly elected. He served until 1991.

Jerônimo Garcia de Santana attempted a political comeback in 1994, was he was an unsuccessful candidate for Governor of Rondônia as a member of the Reform Progressive Party (PPR). In 1998, he lost election to the Chamber of Deputies, this time as a Liberal Front Party (PLF) candidate.

He died from respiratory failure at the Hospital Santa Luzia in Brasília on September 11, 2014, at the age of 79. He had suffered from diabetes and hypertension. His funeral was held in Brasília on September 15, 2014.
