= Jaime Bagattoli =

Brazilian politician

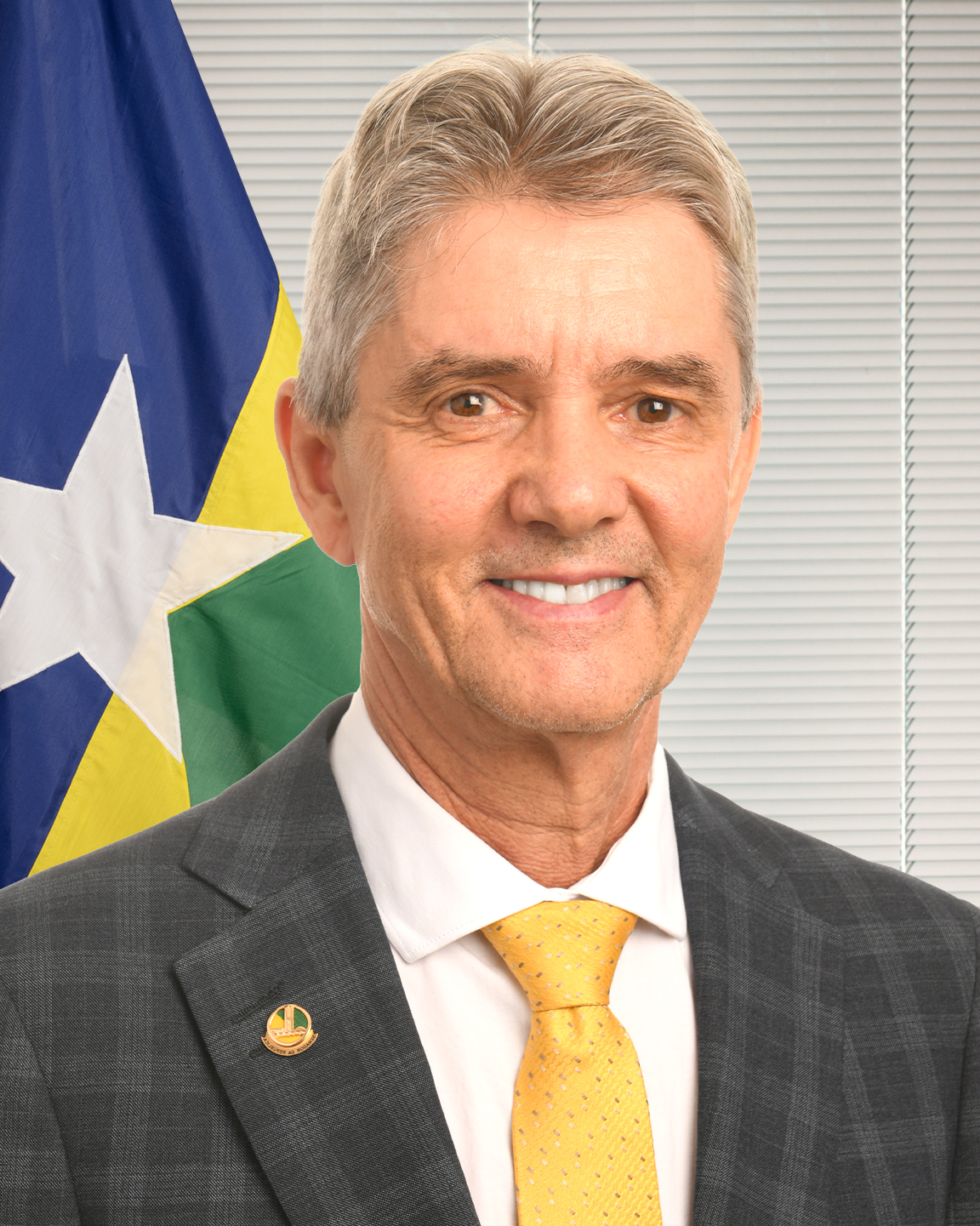

Senator for Rondônia
- Incumbent
- Assumed office 1 February 2023

Personal details
- Born: Jaime Maximino Bagattoli; 26 April 1961 (age 65) Presidente Getúlio, Santa Catarina, Brazil
- Party: PL (2021–present)

Jaime Maximino Bagattoli (born 26 April 1961) is a Brazilian politician, affiliated with the Liberal Party (PL), who has been one of the senators from the state of Rondônia since 2023. Born in Santa Catarina, he is a businessman in the agribusiness industry and lives in the city of Vilhena. He ran for the senate in Rondônia in 2018 with the Social Liberal Party (PSL), ending in 3rd place. In 2022, he was elected senator with 289,553 votes, or 35.87% of the vote.

Bagattoli is an evangelical Christian, being a member of the Assembleias de Deus church.

== Electoral history ==
Year	Election	Party	Position	Votes	%	Result	Ref
2018	Rondônia State Elections	PSL	Senator	212,077	15.70%	Not elected	
2022	Rondônia State Elections	PL	Senator	293,488	35.80%	Elected	
