= Eduardo Gomes (politician, born 1966) =

Brazilian politician (born 1966)

- Official portrait

Senator for Tocantins
- In office 1 February 2019 – 2035

Member of the Chamber of Deputies
- In office 1 February 2003 – 31 January 2015
- Constituency: Tocantins

Personal details
- Born: 28 April 1966 (age 60)
- Party: Liberal Party (since 2022)

Carlos Eduardo Torres Gomes (born 28 April 1966) is a Brazilian politician serving as a member of the Federal Senate since 2019. He reelected for a seat in the Senate for Tocantins in October 2026 with 450.191 votes.

From 2003 to 2015, he was a member of the Chamber of Deputies.
