= 2014 Rondônia gubernatorial election =

- October 5, 2014
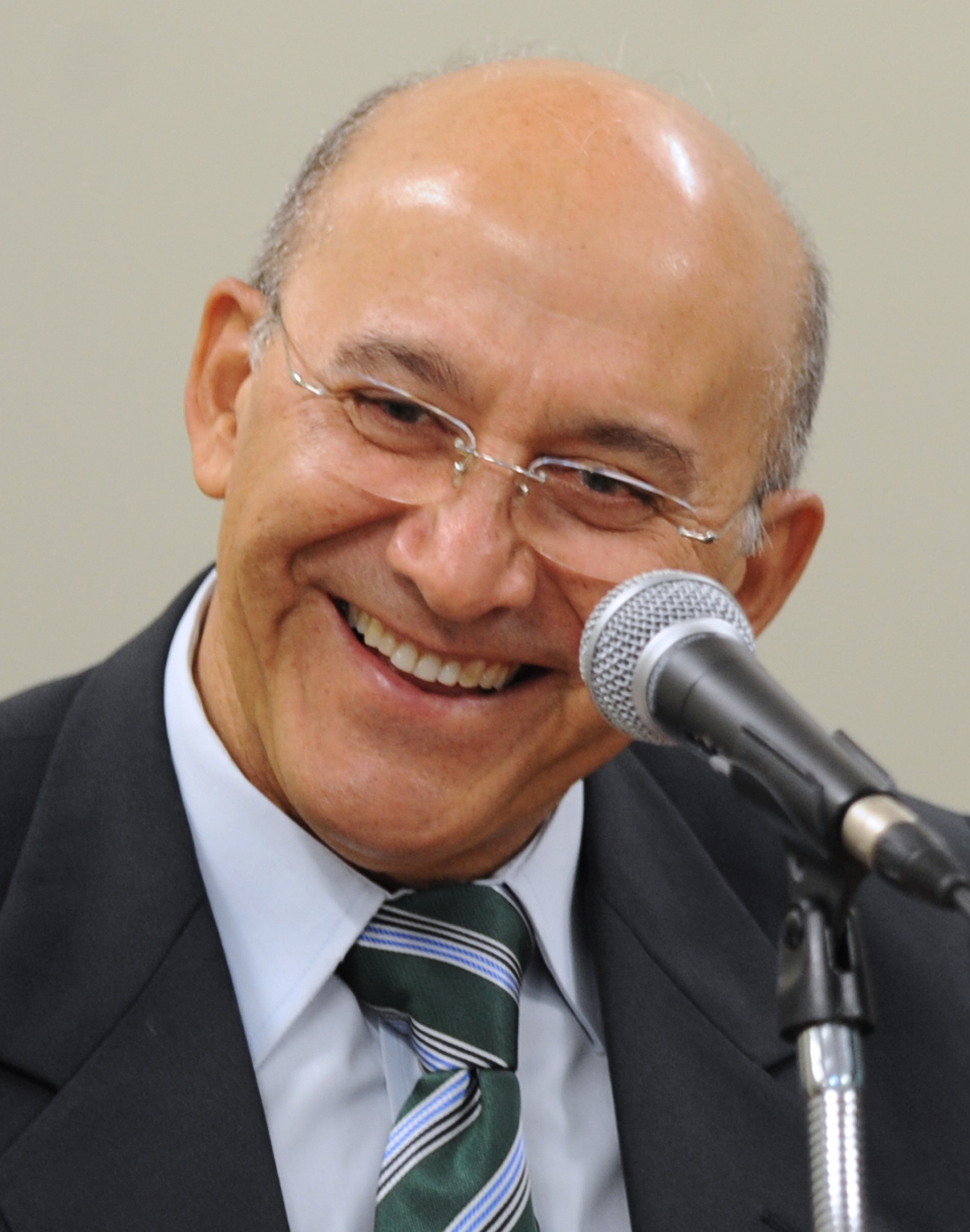

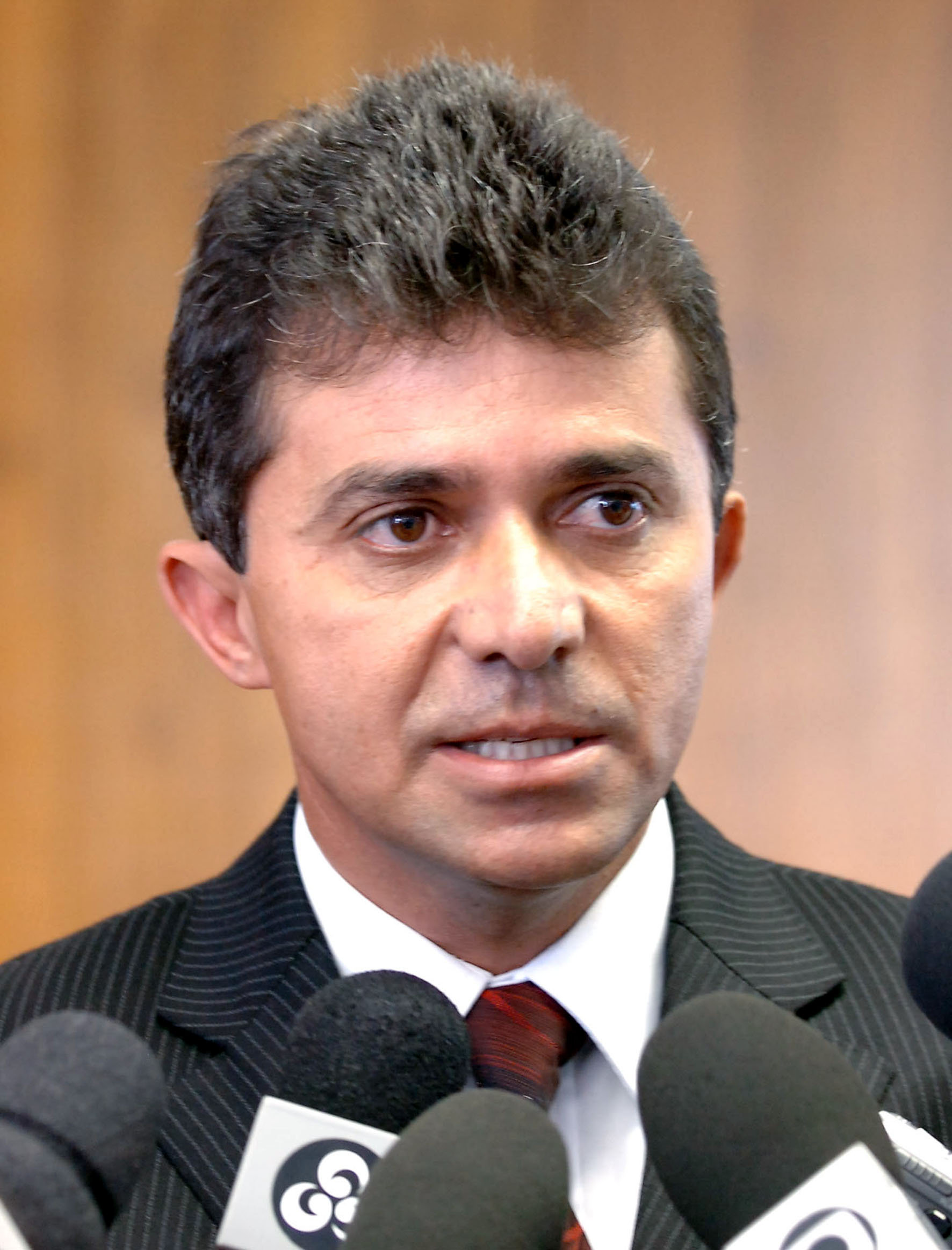
Nominee	Confúcio Moura	Expedito Júnior	Jaqueline Cassol
Party	MDB	PSDB	PR
Running mate	Daniel Pereira	Neodi Carlos	Carlos Magno
Popular vote	419,218	366,072
Percentage	53.43%	46.57%
Governor before election
Confúcio Moura
MDB
Elected Governor
Confúcio Moura

The Rondônia gubernatorial election was held on 5 October 2014 to elect the next governor of the state of Rondônia. If no candidate receives more than 50% of the vote, a second-round runoff election will be held on 26 October. Governor Confúcio Moura is running for a second term. Confúcio Moura won the election.

== Results ==
First Round:

	Number of votes	Percentage of vote
Confúcio Moura (PMDB)	288,220	35.86%
Expedito Júnior (PSDB)	284,663	35.42%
Jaquiline Cassol (PR)	121,406	15.11%
Padre Ton (PT)	101,612	12.64%
Pimenta de Rondonia (PSOL)	7,757	0.97%

Second Round:

	Number of votes	Percentage of vote
Confúcio Moura (PMDB)	419,928	53.43%
Expedito Júnior (PSDB)	366,072	46.57%

== Candidates ==
- Padre Ton 13 (PT) - Federal Deputy (elected in 2010); former Mayor of Alto Alegre dos Parecis (elected in 2004, 2008)
  - Fatinha 13 (PT) - City Councillor, Porto Velho
- Confúcio Moura 15 (PMDB) - Governor of Rondônia (elected in 2010); former Mayor of Ariquemes (2004-2010)
  - Daniel Pereira 15 (PSB) - lawyer, former State Deputy
- Jaqueline Cassol 22 (PR) - Rondônia Director-General of Traffic & Secretary of State for Strategic Assets (2003-2010)
  - Carlos Magno 22 (PP) - Federal Deputy (elected in 2010)
- Expedito Júnior 45 (PSDB) - former Senator (2007-2009) and former Federal Deputy
  - Neodi Carlos 45 (PSDB) - State Deputy (elected in 2006, 2010)
- Pimenta de Rondonia 50 (PSOL) - merchant
  - Professora Régia 50 (PSOL) - secondary school teacher
