= Roberta Acioly =

Brazilian politician (born 1978)

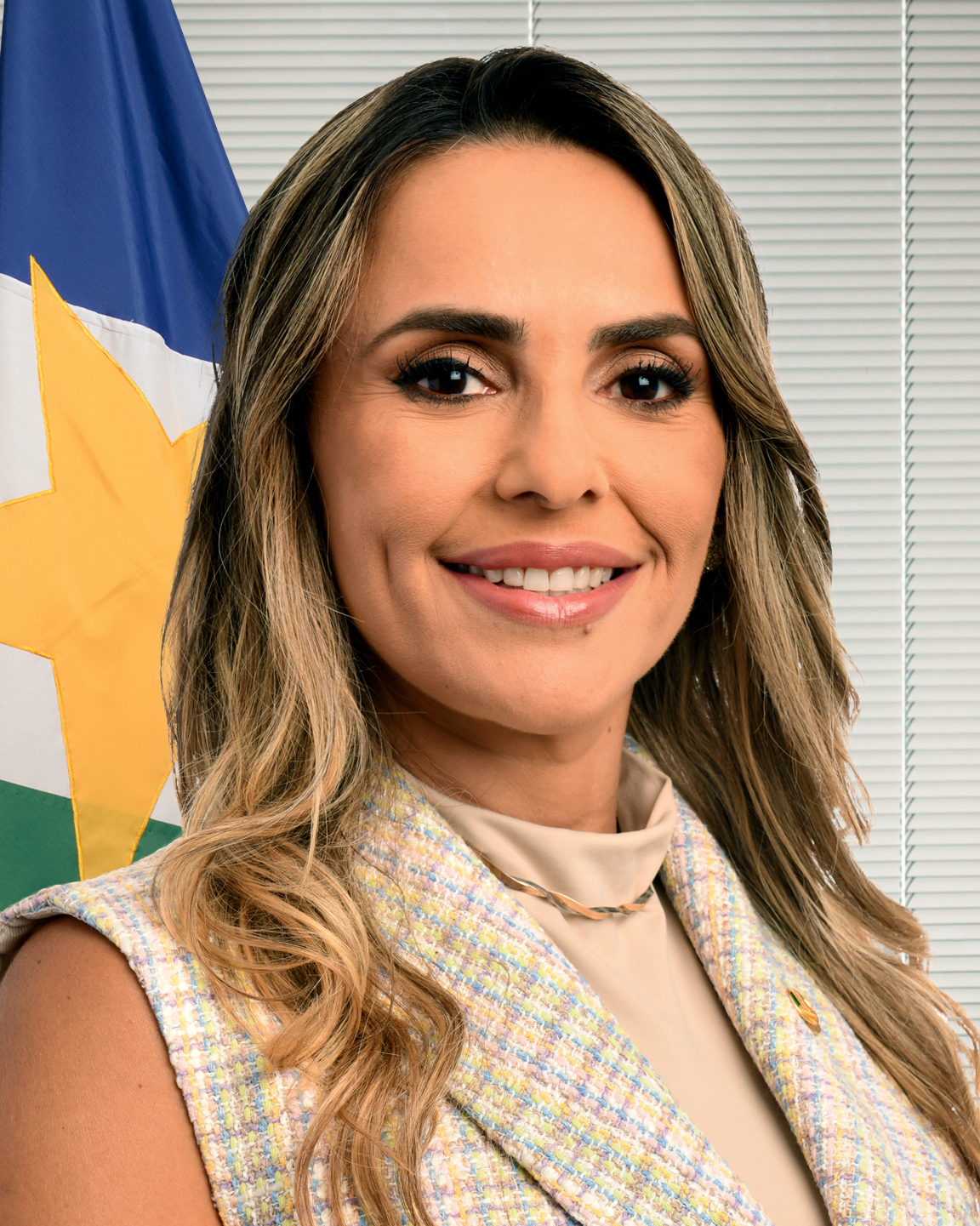
- Acioly in 2026

Member of the Federal Senate
- Incumbent
- Assumed office 11 March 2026
- Preceded by: Mecias de Jesus
- Constituency: Roraima

Personal details
- Born: 19 October 1978 (age 47)
- Party: Republicans (since 2019)

Roberta Leontina Xisto Acioly (born 19 October 1978) is a Brazilian politician serving as a member of the Federal Senate since 2026. She previously served as secretary of health of São Luiz.
