= Laercio Oliveira =

Brazilian politician

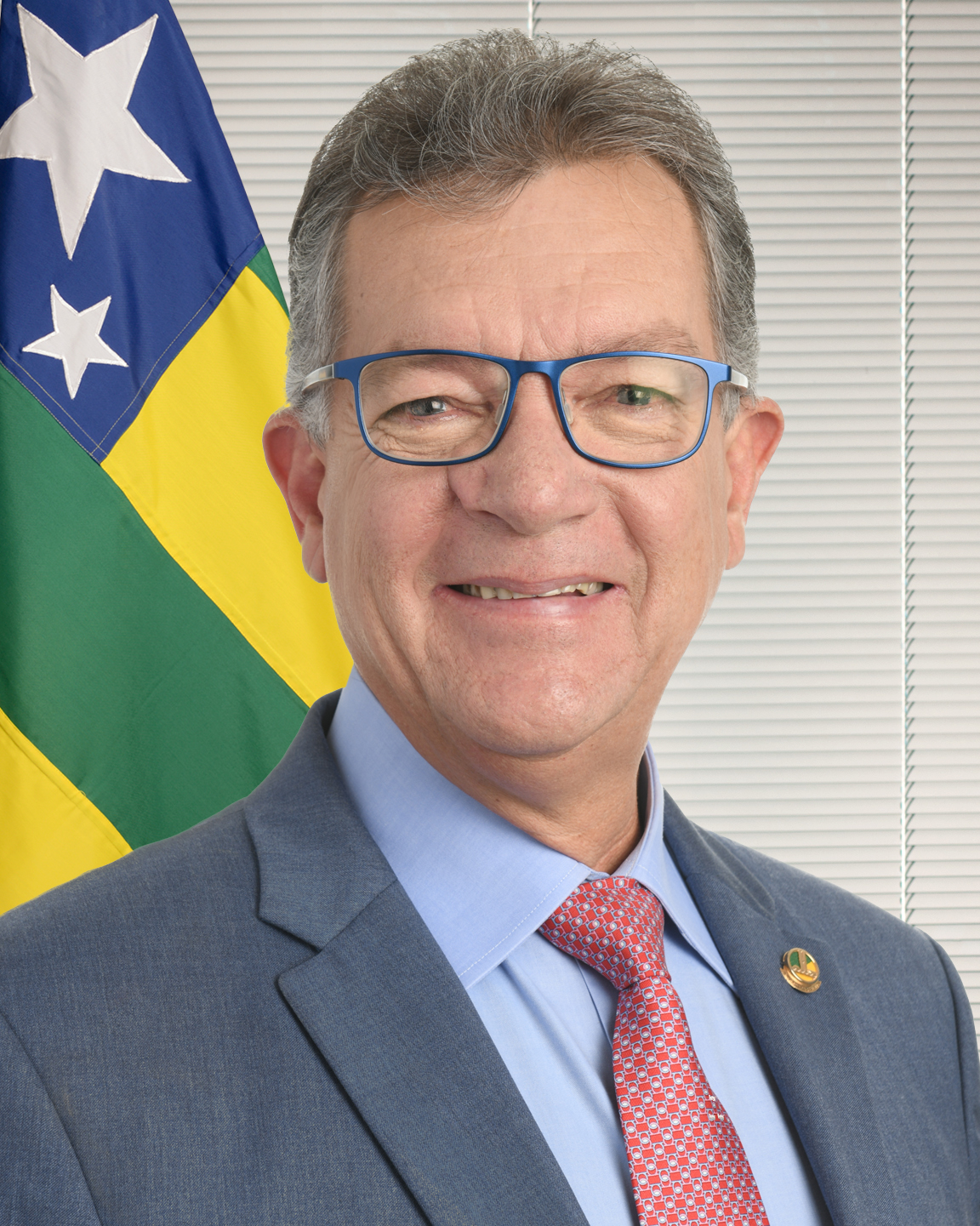
- Official portrait

Senator for Sergipe
- Incumbent
- Assumed office 1 February 2023

Member of the Chamber of Deputies
- In office 1 February 2011 – 1 February 2023
- Constituency: Sergipe

Personal details
- Born: 15 April 1959 (age 67) Recife, Pernambuco, Brazil
- Party: PP (2018–present)
- Other political affiliations: PSDB (2005–09); PR (2009–13); Solidariedade (2013–18)
- Profession: Business administrator

Laercio José de Oliveira (born 15 April 1959) more commonly known as Laercio Oliveira is a Brazilian politician. Although born in Pernambuco, he has spent his political career representing Sergipe, having served as senator since 2023 and as congressman from 2011 to 2023.

== Personal life ==
Oliveira is the son of Severina dos Santos Oliveira and Laércio Lopes de Oliveira. At the age of 18 Oliveira moved from Pernambuco to Sergipe. He is a graduate of Faculdade de Administração e Negócios de Sergipe. Oliveira is a member of the Presbyterian church.

== Political career ==
Oliveira voted in favor of the impeachment of then-president Dilma Rousseff. Oliveira voted in favor of the 2017 Brazilian labor reform, and would vote in favor of a corruption investigation into Rousseff's successor Michel Temer.

== Electoral history ==
Year	Election	Party	Office	Votes	%	Result
2010	State of Sergipe	PR	Congressman	79,514	8.72	Elected
2014	State of Sergipe	Solidariedade	Congressman	84,198	8.58	Elected
2018	State of Sergipe	PP	Congressman	68,014	6.81	Elected
2022	State of Sergipe	PP	Senator	310,300	28.57	Elected
