= Beto Faro =

Brazilian politician

- Official portrait

Senator for Pará
- Incumbent
- Assumed office 1 February 2023

Federal deputy for Pará
- In office 1 February 2007 – 1 February 2023

Personal details
- Born: José Roberto Oliveira Faro; 20 June 1969 (age 57) Bujaru, Pará, Brazil
- Party: PT (1987–present)
- Spouse: Dilvanda Faro

José Roberto Oliveira Faro (born 20 June 1969) is a Brazilian farmer, trade unionist and politician, having been a long-time affiliate of the Workers' Party (PT). He is currently a senator for the state of Pará, having assumed office in 2023. He was previously a federal deputy from 2007 to 2023.

Faro has long had experience as a union activist. He led the Rural Workers' Union in his hometown of Bujaru, the Agricultural Workers' Federation (Fetagri-PA), and the Central Única dos Trabalhadores in Pará. He became known for the consolidation of the National Program for the Strengthening of Family Farming (PRONAF) and for other public policies for the rural population. His wife is federal deputy Dilvanda Faro.

He was elected as a federal deputy in 2014 for the PT. As a federal deputy, he voted against the commencement of impeachment proceedings against president Dilma Rousseff. He would later vote for a similar inquiry towards the impeachment of Michel Temer. In the same term, he voted against both the New Fiscal Regime and the 2017 labor reforms.

During his time as federal deputy, he was co-leader of the PT in the Chamber of Deputies, and was vice-president of the Agriculture, Livestock, Supply and Rural Development committee. In 2010, he was the most voted candidate from the PT, being voted in with 169,504 votes. In 2022, he ran for senator and was elected with 1,781,582 votes.

== Electoral history ==
Year	Election	Party	Position	Votes	%	Result	Ref
1998	Pará State Elections	PT	State deputy	5,031	0.31%	Substitute	
2002	Pará State Elections	PT	Federal deputy	44,269	1.82%	Substitute	
2006	Pará State Elections	PT	Federal deputy	72,148	2.54%	Elected	
2010	Pará State Elections	PT	Federal deputy	169,540	5.40%	Elected	
2014	Pará State Elections	PT	Federal deputy	142,970	4.18%	Elected	
2018	Pará State Elections	PT	Federal deputy	143,822	4.11%	Elected	
2022	Pará State Elections	PT	Senator	1,781,582	42.55%	Elected	
