= Hiran Gonçalves =

Brazilian politician

Hiran Manuel Gonçalves da Silva
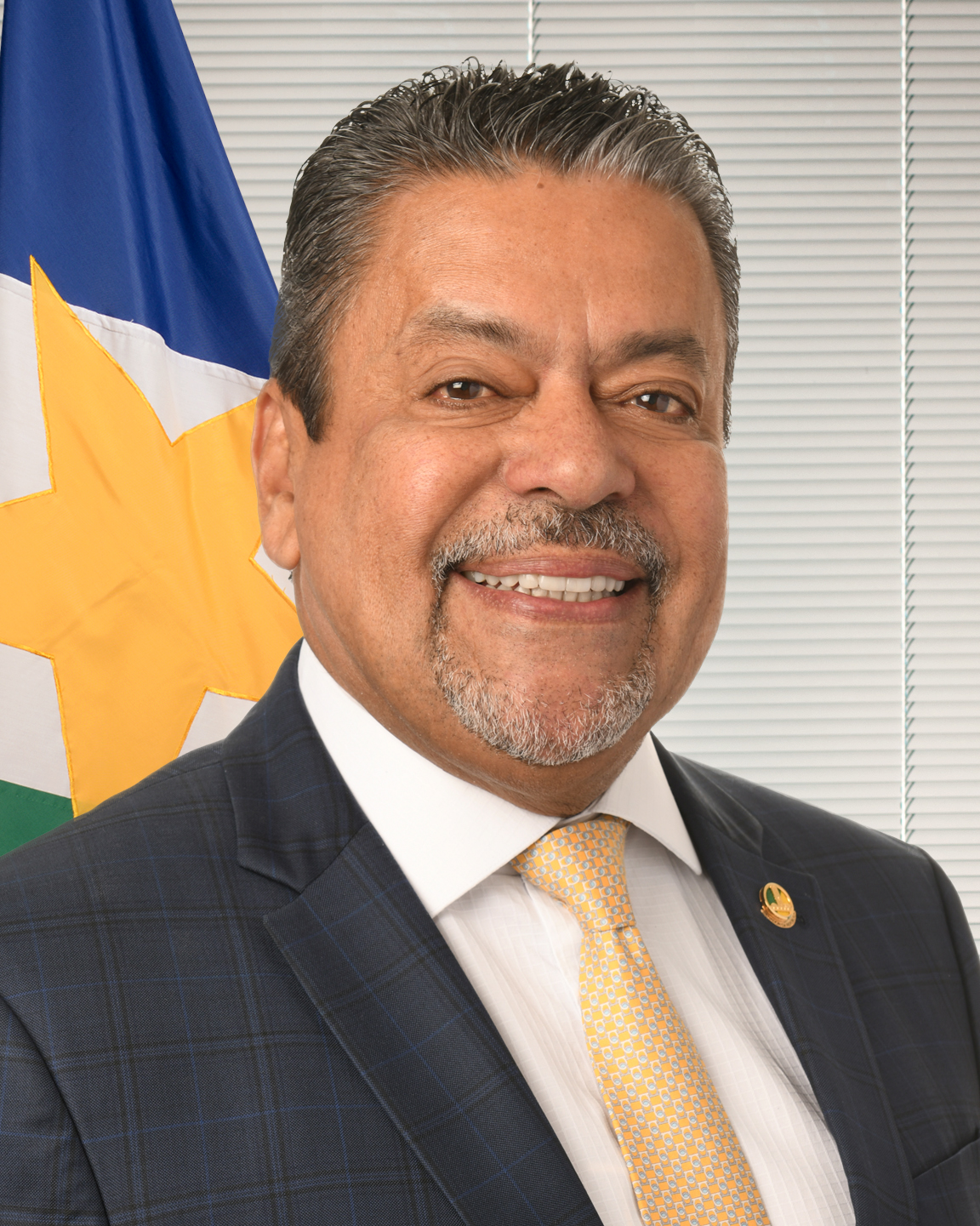
- Official portrait as senator

Senator for Roraima
- Incumbent
- Assumed office 1 February 2023

Federal Deputy for Roraima
- In office 1 February 2015 – 31 January 2023
- Constituency: Roraima

Personal details
- Born: 5 May 1968 (age 58) Tefé, Amazonas, Brazil
- Party: PP (2016–present)
- Other political affiliations: See list: PL (2001–06); PR (2006–09); PTN (2009–10); PHS (2010–11); PSDB (2011–13); PMN (2013–15); PMB (2015–16)
- Spouse: Gerlane Baccarin
- Children: 5
- Education: Federal University of Amazonas (BM)
- Profession: Physician
- Website: www.deputadohirangoncalves.com.br

Hiran Manuel Gonçalves da Silva (born 5 May 1968) is a Brazilian politician as well as a physician and ophthalmologist. Although born in Amazonas, he has spent his political career representing Roraima, having served as state representative since 2015.

== Personal life ==
Gonçalves married to Gerlane Baccarin with whom he has one child and he has four other children from a first marriage and he has four grandchildren. Gonçalves is a physician prior to entering politics, and has also worked as an ophthalmologist and is a member of the American Academy of Ophthalmology. Gonçalves moved with his family from Amazonas to Roraima in 1982, he worked as a medical examiner at the Instituto Médico Legal (IML) in Roraima from 1982 to 2007. He has served briefly as a health inspector to prevent cancer and sexual abuse in the Northwest states of Brazil.

== Political career ==
Gonçalves was initially a member of Party of National Mobilization shortly before running for office switched to the Progressive Party.

Gonçalves voted in favor of the impeachment against then-president Dilma Rousseff. Gonçalves voted in favor of the Brazil labor reform (2017), and would later back Rousseff's successor Michel Temer against a similar impeachment motion.
