= Lauri Miranda Silva =

Brazilian professor (born 1986)

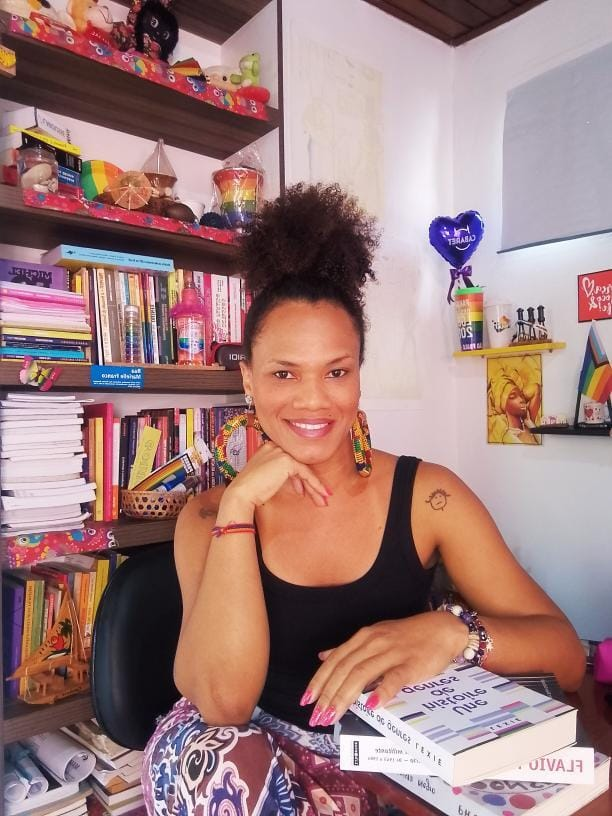
- Born: 22 July 1986 (age 40); Porto Velho, Rondônia, Brazil
- Education: Federal University of Rondônia Federal University of Rio Grande do Sul
- Occupation: Professor

Lauri Miranda Silva (Porto Velho, 22 July 1986) is a Brazilian professor with a degree in History from the Federal University of Rondônia (UNIR) and a doctorate from the Federal University of Rio Grande do Sul (UFRGS). She is the first trans woman in the country to earn a doctorate in History, a fact that occurred in 2023 through the defense of her thesis "Subversive Voices and Transgressive Bodies: Memory of the (Re) Existence of LGBTQIA+ Movement Militants and Intersectional Womanhoods Against Oppression in Rondônia (1980 to 2022)" (Portuguese: Vozes subversivas e corpos transgressores: memoria da (re) existência de militantes do movimento LGBTQIA+ e de mulheridades contra a opressão interseccionais em Rondônia (1980 a 2022)), in which she addresses the LGBTQIA+ and women's movements in the state of Rondônia and their struggles against oppression, as well as her life trajectory as a trans woman.

== Biography ==
=== Early Years and Adolescence ===
Lauri moved in with her maternal grandparents at the age of three due to her mother's postpartum depression. Her father died when she was eight, in 1994. Lauri identifies her ancestry as a combination of Indigenous roots on her father's side and Black and Amazonian ancestry on her mother's side, and defines herself as belonging to a Ribeirinho identity. She grew up in an evangelical family and describes her childhood as happy, but faced racism and bullying at school due to her Afro hair and skin color. In the sixth grade, she experienced one of her first instances of homophobia and was blamed by a teacher for the discrimination she suffered.

During her adolescence, Lauri realized she didn't fit into heteronormative standards and suffered repression. Furthermore, she felt uncomfortable with her body and the clothes she wore. These challenges were heightened both in her family and at church, where prejudice and LGBT-phobia were reported as common. Lauri preferred to be with friends who shared similar identities and interests rather than integrate into distinct groups. She faced difficulties within her family when she began wearing clothing considered "inappropriate" for her gender. Comments like "it's a woman's thing" were frequently made, demonstrating resistance to her identity and personal expression.

=== Adult life ===
Lauri experienced a shift away from religion and faced family attempts to force her to fit into contexts that didn't align with her identity. Reports indicate that seemingly small dreams, like getting a job, were seen as unattainable, reflecting the limitations imposed by her reality and family expectations.

Lauri faced challenges during her transition process. After coming of age, fearing stereotypes that associate trans people with prostitution, she considered moving from Brazil in search of better living conditions, but she didn't give up on her local job search. She began researching courses and colleges through internet cafes because she didn't have internet access, and with the help of her grandparents, she managed to enroll in a computer science program. Initially, she considered majoring in Literature, Geography, or History, but ultimately decided on History, inspired by her high school teacher.

While researching the History program and the historian profession, Lauri's desire to go to college grew. When she passed the Federal University of Rondônia entrance exam, as a trans woman, she faced challenges related to mandatory military enlistment. Upon entering university in 2007, Lauri faced challenges such as rejection by some classmates and difficulty being recognized by her social name. Despite this, she managed to establish herself in the academic environment and became a role model for other transgender people seeking higher education.

She's called herself "Lauri" since high school. However, while she was pursuing her master's degree, she was still using the name registered on her birth certificate, which didn't match her identity and assumed name (deadnaming). The process of changing her social name was gradual and faced a series of uncomfortable situations. In 2018, the Supreme Federal Court (STF) recognized the right of transgender and transgender people to change their name and gender on their civil registry without undergoing sex reassignment surgery.

== Academic contributions ==
Her participation in the First Seminar on Sexual Diversity and Human Rights, organized by the now-defunct NGO "Tucuxi" (2008), on the UNIR campus, was her first direct contact with LGBT activists and intellectuals. Lauri was part of the organizing team for the event, which was held in partnership with the NGO. Her professors recommended her works, giving her her first exposure to the works of cisgender intellectuals, gay or otherwise, such as Michael Foucault, José Carlos Sebe Bom Meihy, Michael Pollak, Antônio Torres Montenegro, Paul Thompson, Verena Albert, Michelle Perrot, João Trevisan, and other authors considered important in the field at the time. These readings not only influenced her research and academic development but also helped her understand her own sexual orientation and gender identity more fluidly.

Her major work is the thesis "Subversive Voices and Transgressive Bodies: Memories of (Re)existence of LGBTQIAP+ and Women's Movement Activists Against Intersectional Oppression in Rondônia (1980 to 2022)," in which she addresses the struggle and resistance of social movements in the state of Rondônia over four decades. Her thesis analyzes the memories and experiences of activists facing intersectional oppression, considering factors such as gender, sexuality, race, and class. The work explores how these subversive voices challenge social and cultural norms, contributing to the construction of identity and the creation of spaces of resistance. Lauri seeks to understand the narratives of these individuals, emphasizing the importance of collective memory in the fight against inequalities and the promotion of human rights. In its exploration of the historical context of Rondônia, the thesis also reveals how these struggles are interconnected with the broader issue of Brazilian society, proposing a critical reflection on the scenario and strategies of resistance.

=== Works and awards ===
Lauri Miranda has 24 bibliographic productions, including 9 book chapters, 3 published articles and 1 article accepted for publication, 11 works presented at events, including her master's dissertation, her course completion work and her doctoral thesis, which won the Brazilian Oral History Association Ecléa Bosi Thesis Award on September 6, 2024.

== See also ==
- LGBTQ rights in Rondônia
- Transgender rights in Brazil
