= Sérgio Gonçalves (Brazilian politician) =

Brazilian politician (born 1974)

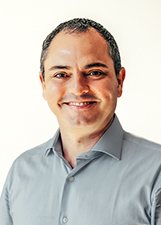
- Gonçalves in 2022

Vice Governor of Rondônia
- Incumbent
- Assumed office 1 January 2023
- Governor: Marcos Rocha
- Preceded by: Zé Jodan

Personal details
- Born: 28 May 1974 (age 52)
- Party: Brazil Union (since 2022)

Sérgio Gonçalves da Silva (born 28 May 1974) is a Brazilian politician serving as vice governor of Rondônia since 2023. Until 2025, he served as secretary of economic development of Rondônia.
