= Confúcio Moura =

Brazilian politician

Senator for Rondônia
- Incumbent
- Assumed office February 1, 2019

Governor of Rondônia
- In office January 1, 2011 – April 6, 2018
- Preceded by: João Aparecido Cahulla
- Succeeded by: Daniel Pereira

Mayor of Ariquemes
- In office 1 January 2005 – 31 March 2010
- Preceded by: Daniela Amorim
- Succeeded by: Márcio Londe Raposo

Federal Deputy for Rondônia
- In office 1 February 1995 – 31 December 2004

Personal details
- Born: May 16, 1948 (age 78) Dianópolis, Tocantins
- Party: MDB

Confúcio Aires Moura (born May 16, 1948 Dianópolis, Tocantins) is a Brazilian politician and member of the Brazilian Democratic Movement Party (PMBD). He served as the Governor of Rondônia between January 1, 2011 and April 6, 2018. In 2018, he has elected to Federal Senate.

Political offices
Preceded by João Aparecido Cahulla	Governor of Rondônia; 2011–2018	Succeeded by Daniel Pereira
