= Presidente Getúlio =

- Municipality
- Flag Coat of arms

- Location of Presidente Getúlio in the State of Santa Catarina

- Location in Brazil
- Coordinates: 27°03′03″S 49°37′22″W
- Country: Brazil
- Region: South
- State: Santa Catarina
- Mesoregion: Vale do Itajai

Area
  - Total: 114,730 sq mi (297,160 km^{2})

Population (2020)
  - Total: 17,726
  - Density: 0.15450/sq mi (0.059651/km^{2})
- Time zone: UTC -3
- Website: presidentegetulio.sc.gov.br

Presidente Getúlio is a municipality in the state of Santa Catarina in the South region of Brazil.

== See also ==
- List of municipalities in Santa Catarina
