= Legislative Assembly of the State of Rondônia =

Legislative Assembly of the State of Rondônia Assembleia Legislativa do Estado de Rondônia
- 11th Legislature

Type
- Type: Unicameral

Leadership
- President: Alex Redano, Republicans since 1 February 2023
- 1st VP: Laerte Gomes, PSD
- 1st Secretary: Alan Queiroz, Podemos

Structure
- Political groups: UNIÃO (5) Podemos (3) PRD (3) PSD (3) MDB (2) PL (2) Republicans (2) PP (1) PRTB (1) PT (1) Unaffiliated (1) (Note: Ismael Crispin left MDB in September 2025)

Elections
- Voting system: Proportional representation
- Last election: 2 October 2022
- Next election: 2026

Meeting place
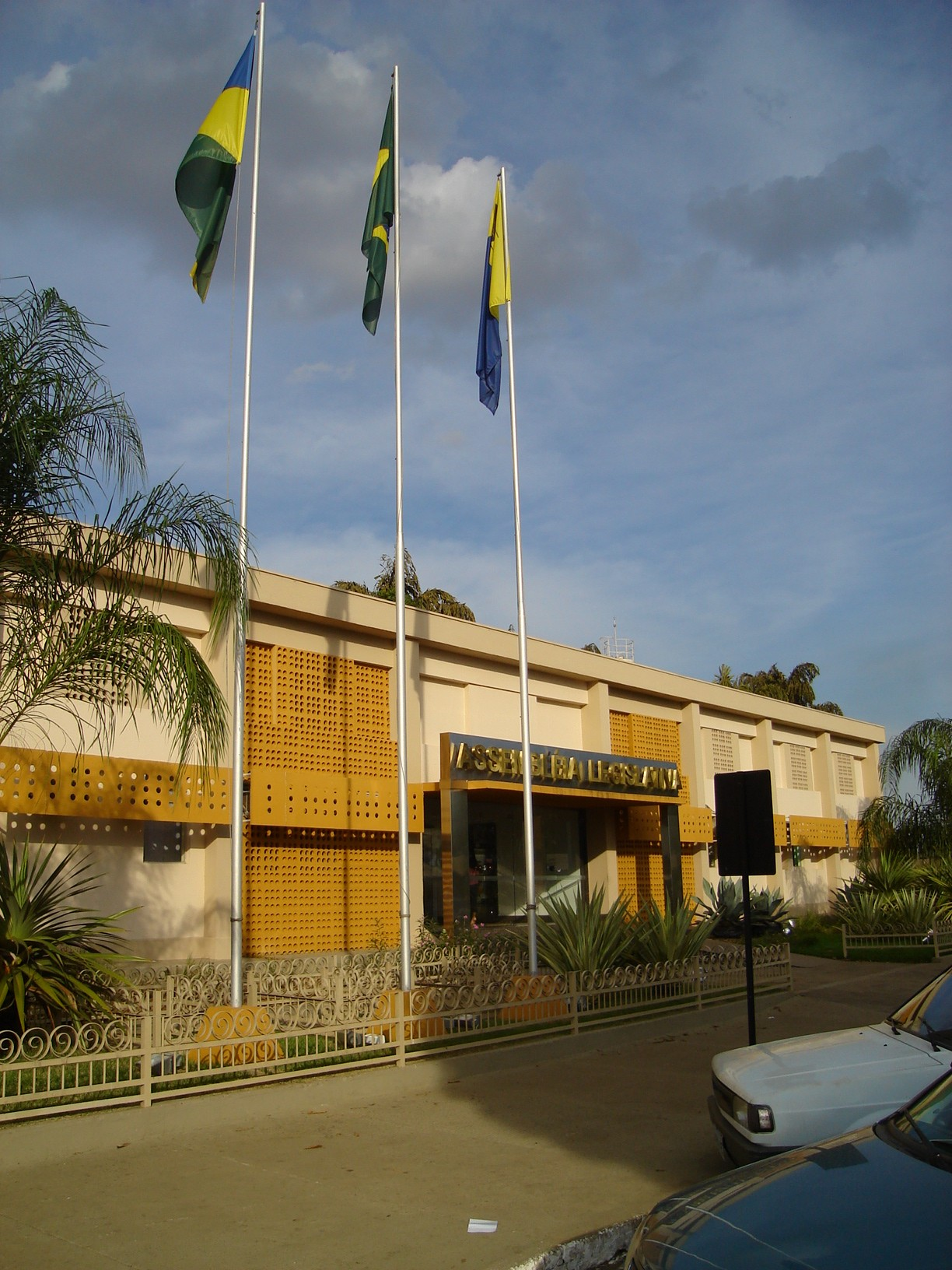
- Rondônia Legislative Assembly building

The Legislative Assembly of the State of Rondônia (Portuguese: Assembleia Legislativa do Estado de Rondônia) is the legislative body of the government of state of Rondônia in Brazil.

It is composed of 24 state deputies. It is located in Porto Velho, Rondônia.
