= Marcos Rocha (politician) =

Brazilian politician (born 1968)

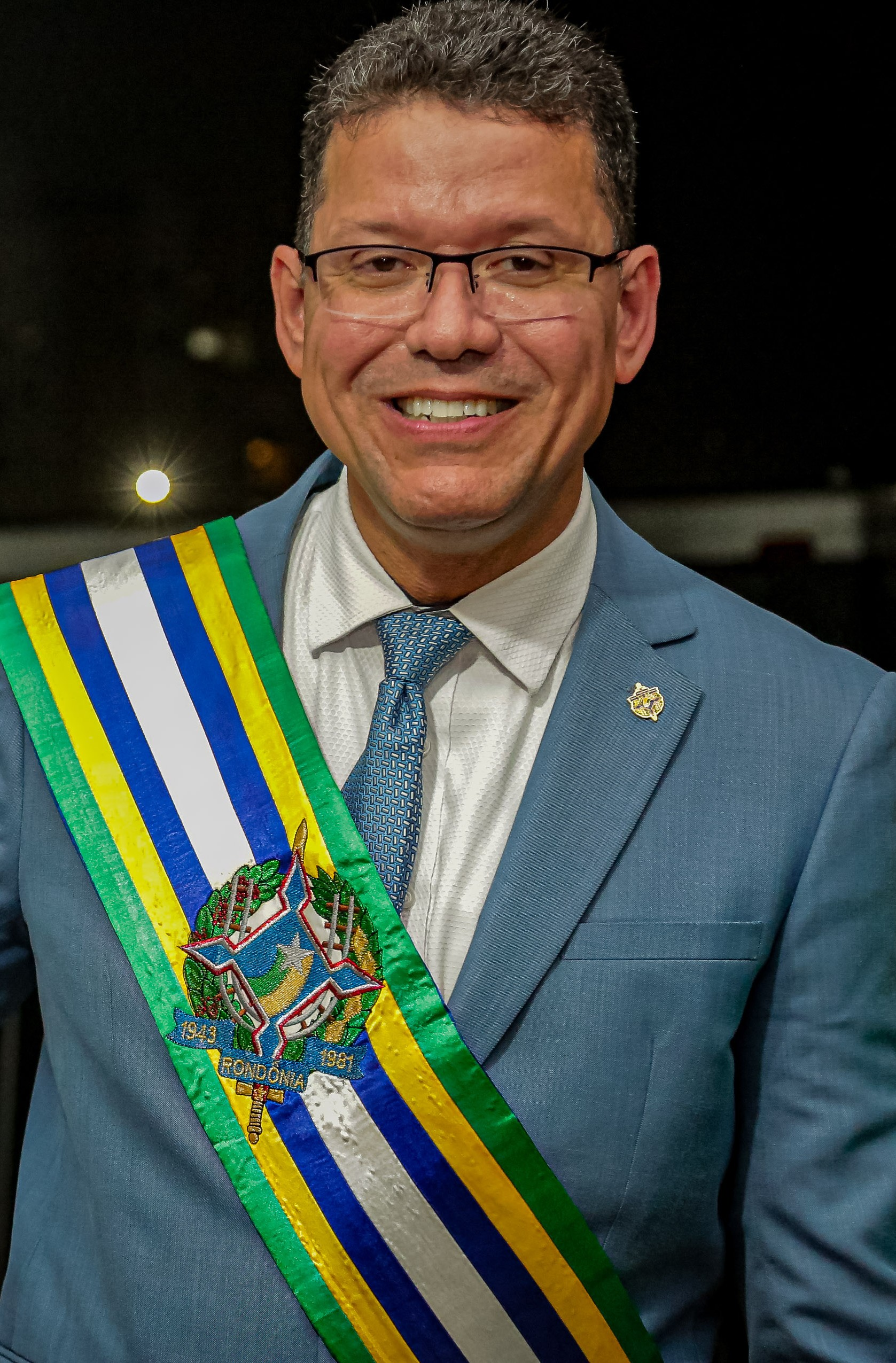
- Rocha in 2022

Governor of Rondônia
- Incumbent
- Assumed office 1 January 2019
- Preceded by: Daniel Pereira

Personal details
- Born: 3 August 1968 (age 58)
- Party: Brazil Union (since 2022)

Marcos José Rocha dos Santos (born 3 August 1968) is a Brazilian politician serving as governor of Rondônia since 2019. From 2014 to 2017, he served as secretary of justice of Rondônia.
