= Bujaru =

Coordinates: 1°31′S 48°01′W

- Municipality
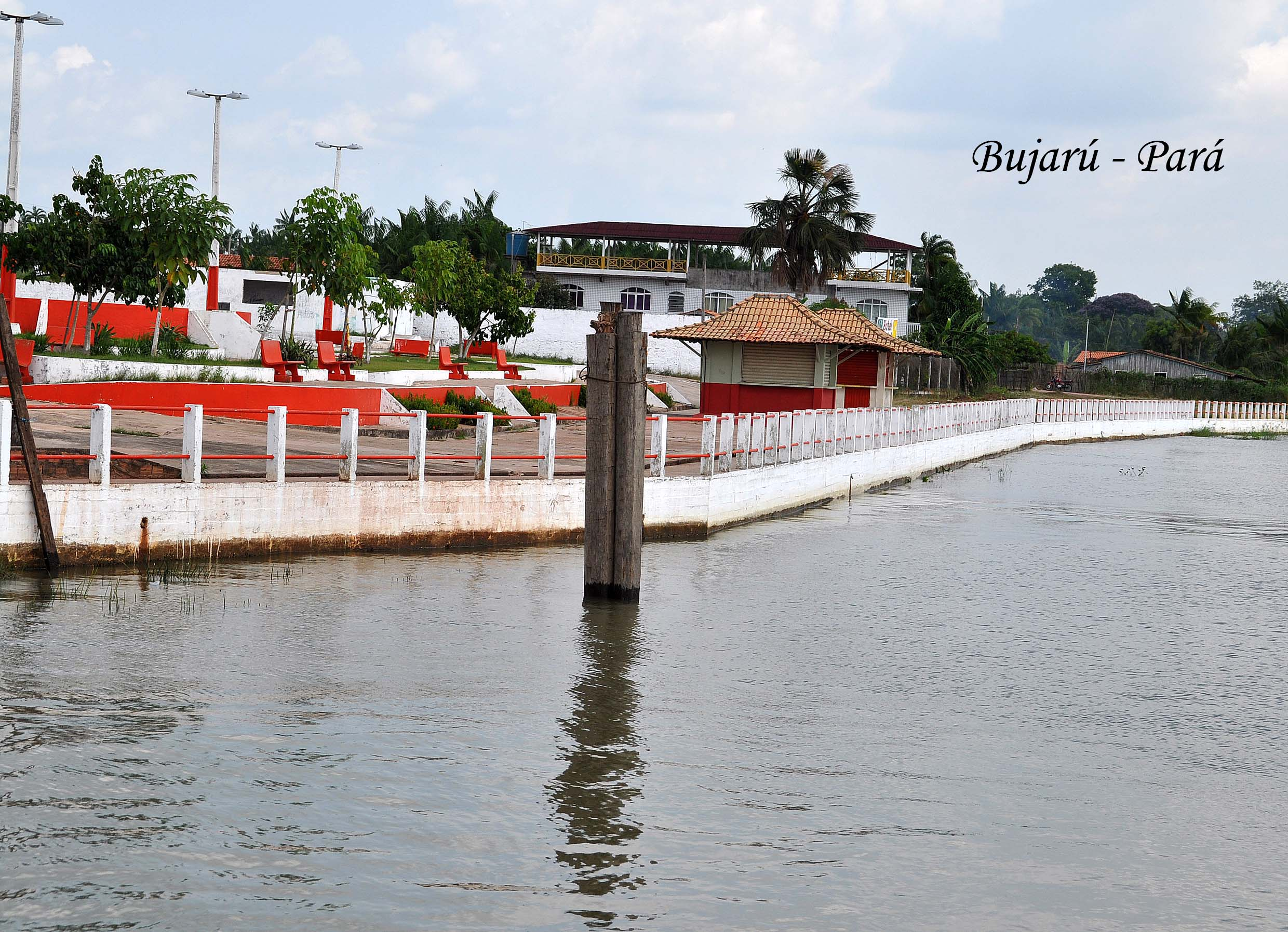

- Bujaru in Pará State
- Country: Brazil
- Region: Northern
- State: Pará
- Mesoregion: Metropolitana de Belém

Population (2020)
  - Total: 29,427
- Time zone: UTC−3 (BRT)

Bujaru is a municipality in the state of Pará in the Northern region of Brazil.

== See also ==
- List of municipalities in Pará
