= 2022 Mato Grosso do Sul gubernatorial election =

Gubernatorial election to be held in Brazil

2022 Mato Grosso do Sul state election
- 2 October 2022 (first round); 30 October 2022 (second round)
- Turnout: 77.90% (first round); 77.65% (second round)
- Gubernatorial election
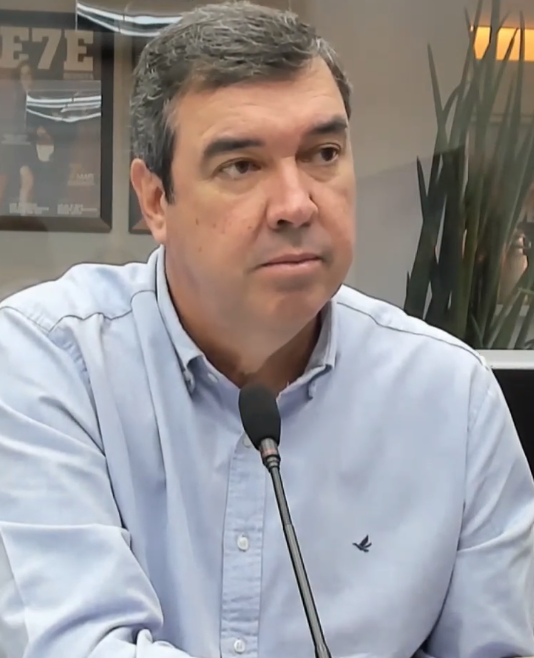

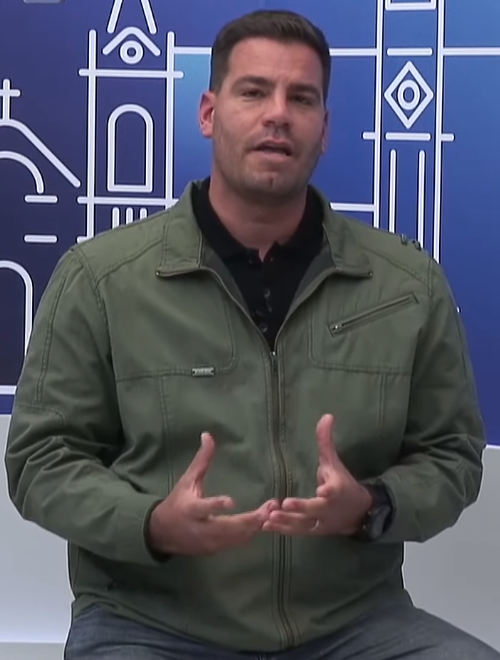
Candidate	Eduardo Riedel	Renan Contar
Party	PSDB	PRTB
Alliance	Working for a New Future	True Change
Running mate	José Carlos Barbosa	Roberto Figueiró
Popular vote	808,210	612,113
Percentage	56.90%	43.10%
- Candidate with the most votes per municipality in the 2nd round (79): Eduardo Riedel (72 municipalities); Renan Contar (7 municipalities)
Governor before election
Reinaldo Azambuja
PSDB
Elected Governor
Eduardo Riedel
PSDB
- Senatorial election
- 2 October 2022 (one-only round)
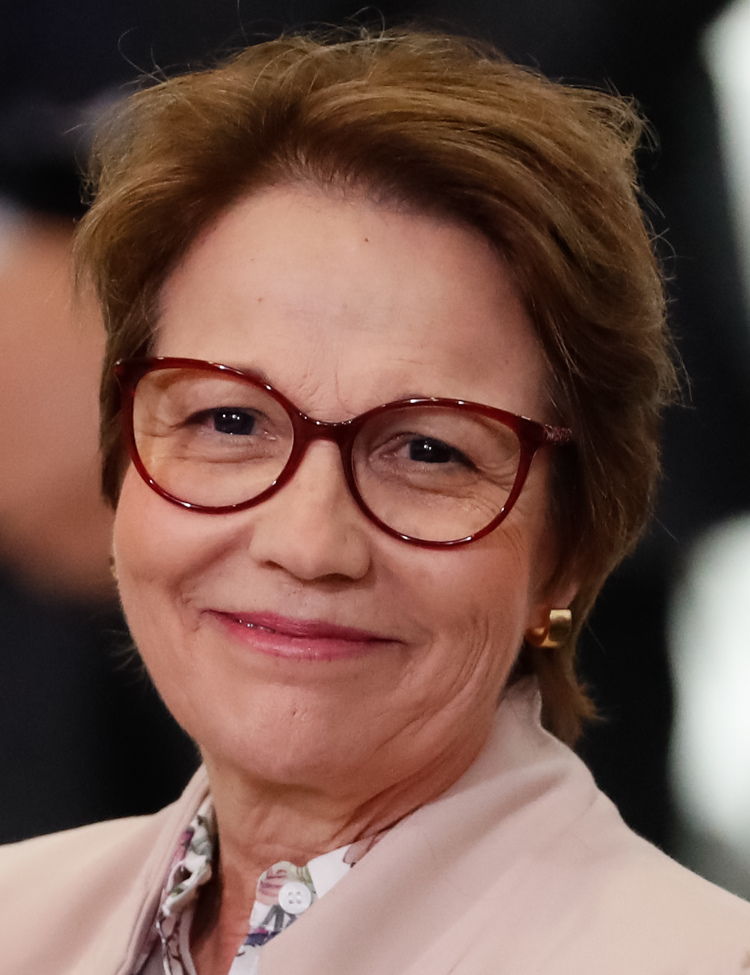

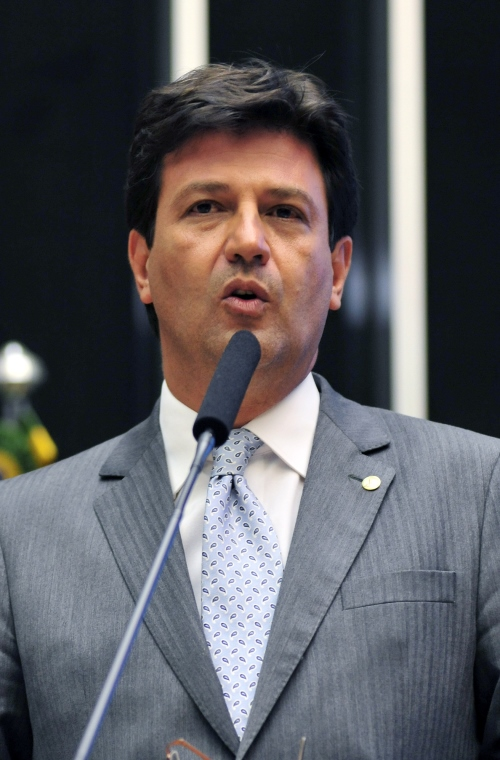
Candidate	Tereza Cristina	Mandetta
Party	PP	UNIÃO
Alliance	Working for a New Future	Moving Forward for our People
Popular vote	829,149	206,093
Percentage	60.85%	15.12%
- Candidate with the most votes per municipality (79): Tereza Cristina (79 municipalities)
Senator before election
Simone Tebet
MDB
Elected Senator
Tereza Cristina
PP

The 2022 Mato Grosso do Sul state election took place in the state of Mato Grosso do Sul, Brazil between 2 October 2022 (first round) and 30 October 2022 (second round). Voters elected a governor, vice governor, a senator, 8 representatives for the Chamber of Deputies of Brazil (federal deputies) and 24 Legislative Assembly members (state deputies). The incumbent governor at the time, Reinaldo Azambuja, wasn't allowed to run for reelection for a third consecutive time due to term limits established by the Federal Constitution of Brazil (art. 14, paragraph 5).

Eduardo Riedel, a member of the Brazilian Social Democracy Party was elected governor along with José Carlos Barbosa, his vice governor, a member of Progressistas. The governor and the vice governor are both elected for a four-year term starting 1 January 2023 and with the approval of Constitutional Amendment nº 111, their terms will end on 6 January 2027.

For the Federal Senate election, the seat occupied by the incumbent Simone Tebet (MDB) was at dispute. She was first elected as a senator in 2014 Mato Grosso do Sul state elections and decided to run for presidency in 2022 Brazilian general election. Tereza Cristina, the former Minister of Agriculture of Brazil under the Presidency of Jair Bolsonaro, was elected to replace Tebet as a senator for an eight-year term (2023–2031).

== Electoral calendar ==
Note: This section only presents the main dates of the 2022 electoral calendar, check the TSE official website (in Portuguese) and other official sources for detailed information.

Electoral calendar
15 May	Start of crowdfunding of candidates
20 July to 5 August	Party conventions for choosing candidates and coalitions
16 August to 30 September	Period of exhibition of free electoral propaganda on radio, television and on the internet related to the first round
2 October	First round of 2022 elections
7 October to 28 October	Period of exhibition of free electoral propaganda on radio, television and on the internet related to the second round
30 October	Second round of 2022 elections
until 19 December	Delivery of electoral diplomas for those who were elected in the 2022 elections by the Brazilian Election Justice

== Gubernatorial candidates ==
The party conventions began on July 20 and continued until 5 August 2022. The following political parties have confirmed their candidacies. Political parties had until 15 August 2022 to formally register their candidates.

=== Confirmed candidacies ===
- Eduardo Riedel (PSDB): Riedel was born in the city of Rio de Janeiro. He is a businessman and was the Secretary of State for Infrastructure and Housing of Mato Grosso do Sul from February 2021 to April 2022 and also the Secretary of State for Government and Strategic Management of Mato Grosso do Sul from 2015 to 2021, both of these under Reinaldo Azambuja's government. Riedel was also the president of the Maracaju Union in 1999, the vice-president of the Federation of Agriculture and Livestock of Mato Grosso do Sul and was also the director of the National Confederation of Agriculture (CNA). Riedel was also the president of Famasul from 2012 to 2014 and from 2011 to 2014, he was also the president of the Council of Sebrae/MS. His candidacy was announced at a Brazilian Social Democracy Party convention on 5 August 2022. The vice on his gubernatorial ticket is the lawyer José Carlos Barbosa (also known as Barbosinha), born in São Simão and a member of Progressives (PP). Barbosinha was a state deputy between 2014 and 2023 and was also Secretary of State for Justice and Public Security of Mato Grosso do Sul between April 2016 and December 2017, president of SANESUL between 2007 and 2014 and mayor of the city of Angélica, Mato Grosso do Sul between 1989 and 1992.
- Capitão Contar (PRTB): Contar was born in Campinas and is a military veteran. He was also a state deputy for Mato Grosso do Sul from 2019 to 2023 and was also the most voted state deputy in the 2018 Mato Grosso do Sul state elections. His candidacy was announced at a party convention on 5 August 2022. The vice on his gubernatorial ticket is Humberto Sávio Abussafi Figueiró (also known as Beto Figueiró), a lawyer, university professor, businessman and rancher. He was born in Campo Grande and is also a member of the Brazilian Labour Renewal Party.
- André Puccinelli (MDB): Puccinelli was born in Viareggio, Italy, and is a doctor. He was also the Governor of Mato Grosso do Sul from 2007 to 2015, Mayor of Campo Grande from 1997 to 2005, Federal Deputy for Mato Grosso do Sul from 1995 to 1997 and State Deputy for Mato Grosso do Sul from 1987 to 1995. Puccinelli was also the State Secretary of Health of Mato Grosso do Sul from 1983 to 1984 under Wilson Barbosa Martins' government. His candidacy was announced at a Brazilian Democratic Movement convention on 5 August 2022. The vice on his gubernatorial ticket is the former Secretary of Social Assistance of Mato Grosso do Sul, Tania Garib, born in Regente Feijó.
- Rose Modesto (UNIÃO): Modesto was born in Fátima do Sul and was a teacher and a federal deputy for Mato Grosso do Sul from 2019 to 2023. She was also the vice-governor of Mato Grosso do Sul from 2015 to 2019 and also the Secretary of Human Rights, Social Assistance and Labour of Mato Grosso do Sul under Reinaldo Azambuja's government from 2015 to 2016. She was also a councillor of Campo Grande from 2009 to 2014. Her candidacy was announced on a Brazil Union convention on 22 July 2022. The vice on her gubernatorial ticket is the agricultural producer Alberto Schlatter, born in Presidente Wenceslau and a member of Podemos (PODE).
- Marquinhos Trad (PSD): Trad was born in Campo Grande, is a lawyer and was the mayor of Campo Grande from 2017 to 2022, a state deputy for Mato Grosso do Sul from 2007 to 2016 and was also a councillor of Campo Grande from 2005 to 2007. He was also the Municipal Secretary of Land Affairs of Campo Grande in André Puccinelli's government from 1996 to 2000. His candidacy was announced at a convention of the Social Democratic Party on 30 July 2022. The vice on his gubernatorial ticket presented is the doctor Viviane Orro, born in Aquidauana and also a member of the Social Democratic Party.
- Giselle Marques (PT): Marques was born in Campo Grande and is a lawyer, activist and a professor. She was also the manager of Environmental Control at Imasul from 2002 to 2004 and the superintendent of Procon/MS from 2004 to 2007. Her candidacy was announced at a Workers' Party (Brazil of Hope) convention on 30 July 2022. The vice on her gubernatorial ticket is the lawyer Abilio Vaneli, born in Coxim and also a member of the Workers' Party.
- Adonis Marcos (PSOL): Adonis was born in Cascavel and is a businessman and his candidacy was announced by the PSOL REDE Federation on 24 July 2022. The vice on his gubernatorial ticket is Ilmo Candido de Souza, born in the city of São Paulo. Ilmo is a member of the Sustainability Network (REDE).

=== Rejected candidacies ===
- Magno de Souza (PCO): The Regional Electoral Court of Mato Grosso do Sul (TRE-MS) rejected his candidacy because it didn't comply with the Clean Record Act.

=== Candidates in run off ===
Party	Candidate	Most relevant political office or occupation	Party	Running mate	Coalition	Electoral number	TV time per party/coalition
Brazilian Labour Renewal Party (PRTB)	Renan Contar	State Deputy of Mato Grosso do Sul (2019–2023)	Brazilian Labour Renewal Party (PRTB)	Beto Figueiró	Real change: PRTB; Avante	28	5min
Brazilian Social Democracy Party (PSDB)	Eduardo Riedel	Secretary of State for Infrastructure of Mato Grosso do Sul (2021–2022)	Progressives (PP)	Barbosinha	Working for a new future: Always Forward Federation (PSDB/Cidadania); Republicans; PP; PSB; PL; PDT	45	5min

=== Candidates failing to make runoff ===
Party	Candidate	Most relevant political office or occupation	Party	Running mate	Coalition	Electoral number	TV time per party/coalition
Brazilian Democratic Movement (MDB)	André Puccinelli	Governor of Mato Grosso do Sul (2007–2015)	Brazilian Democratic Movement (MDB)	Tania Garib	To Work Again, with the Power of the People: DC; Solidariedade; MDB	15	58sec
Brazil Union (UNIÃO)	Rose Modesto	Vice Governor of Mato Grosso do Sul (2015–2019)	Podemos (PODE)	Alberto Schlatter	Moving Forward to Take Care of Our People: UNIÃO; PODE	44	2min and 2sec
Workers' Party (PT)	Giselle Marques	Superintendent of Procon/MS (2004–2007)	Workers' Party (PT)	Abilio Vaneli	No coalition: Brazil of Hope (PT/PCdoB/PV)	13	1min and 23sec
Social Democratic Party (PSD)	Marquinhos Trad	State Deputy of Mato Grosso do Sul (2007–2016)	Social Democratic Party (PSD)	Viviane Orra	Change MS: Patriota; PTB; PSC; PSD	55	1min and 13sec
Socialism and Liberty Party (PSOL)	Adonis Marcos	Businessman	Sustainability Network (REDE)	Ilmo Candido de Souza	No coalition: PSOL Rede Federation (PSOL/REDE)	50	19sec

== Senatorial candidates ==
Candidates
Anizio Tocchio PSOL
Mandetta UNION
Judge Odilon PSD
Teresa Cristina PP
Professor Tiago Botelho PT
Jeferson Bezerra No coalition
Presentation in accordance with the order of electoral propaganda and party representation	Leftovers:0:03

== Results ==
=== Governor ===
Candidate	Running mate	Party	First round		Second round	
Candidate	Running mate	Party	Votes	%	Votes	%
Eduardo Riedel	José Carlos Barbosa (PP)	PSDB	361,981	25.22	808,210	56.90
Renan Contar	Roberto Figueiró	PRTB	384,275	26.77	612,113	43.10
André Puccinelli	Tania Garib	MDB	247,093	17.21		
Rose Modesto	Alberto Schlatter (PODE)	UNIÃO	178,599	12.44		
Giselle Marques	Abílio Vaneli	PT	135,556	9.44		
Marcos Trad	Viviane Orro	PSD	124,795	8.69		
Adônis Marcos	Ilmo Cândido (REDE)	PSOL	3,251	0.23		
Magno de Souza	Carlos Martins	PCO	2,892			
Total			1,435,550	100.00	1,420,323	100.00
Valid votes			1,435,550	92.46	1,420,323	91.78
Invalid votes			64,022	4.12	88,228	5.70
Blank votes			53,082	3.42	39,059	2.52
Total votes			1,552,654	100.00	1,547,610	100.00
Registered voters/turnout			1,993,121	77.90	1,993,121	77.65
PSDB hold						

=== Senator ===
Candidate	Party	Votes	%
Tereza Cristina	PP	829,149	60.94
Luiz Henrique Mandetta	UNIÃO	206,093	15.15
Tiago Botelho	PT	178,041	13.09
Odilon de Oliveira	PSD	146,261	10.75
Anizio Tocchio	PSOL	2,101	
Jeferson Bezerra	Agir	1,000	0.07
Total		1,360,544	100.00
Valid votes		1,360,544	87.63
Invalid votes		101,033	6.51
Blank votes		91,077	5.87
Total votes		1,552,654	100.00
Registered voters/turnout		1,993,121	77.90
PP gain from MDB			

=== Chamber of Deputies ===
Party or alliance		Votes	%	Seats	+/–
Always Forward	Brazilian Social Democracy Party	316,966	22.44	3	▲1
Always Forward	Cidadania	536	0.04	0	Steady
Liberal Party		218,427	15.47	2	▲2
Brazil of Hope	Workers' Party	201,961	14.30	2	▲1
Brazil of Hope	Green Party	1,869	0.13	0	Steady
Brazil of Hope	Communist Party of Brazil	1,486	0.11	0	Steady
Progressistas		201,961	14.30	1	▲1
Social Democratic Party		82,584	5.85	0	▼1
Brazilian Democratic Movement		77,614	5.50	0	Steady
Republicanos		75,274	5.33	0	Steady
Podemos		63,976	4.53	0	Steady
Brazil Union		63,354	4.49	0	New
Brazilian Labour Party		30,038	2.13	0	Steady
Brazilian Labour Renewal Party		22,135	1.57	0	Steady
Democratic Labour Party		12,566	0.89	0	▼1
Solidariedade		9,219	0.65	0	Steady
Brazilian Socialist Party		8,599	0.61	0	Steady
New Party		7,183	0.51	0	Steady
PSOL REDE	Socialism and Liberty Party	5,806	0.41	0	Steady
PSOL REDE	Sustainability Network	1,365	0.10	0	Steady
Avante		5,683	0.40	0	Steady
Republican Party of the Social Order		2,264	0.16	0	Steady
Agir		823	0.06	0	Steady
Christian Democracy		528	0.04	0	Steady
Workers' Cause Party		0	0.00	0	Steady
Total		1,412,217	100.00	8	–
Valid votes		1,374,808	88.55		
Invalid votes		83,018	5.35		
Blank votes		94,828	6.11		
Total votes		1,552,654	100.00		
Registered voters/turnout		1,993,121	77.90		

=== Legislative Assembly ===
Party or alliance		Votes	%	Seats	+/–
Always Forward	Brazilian Social Democracy Party	287,542	22.80	6	▲1
Always Forward	Cidadania	5,494	0.44	0	Steady
Brazil of Hope	Workers' Party	153,613	12.18	3	▲1
Brazil of Hope	Green Party	3,135	0.25	0	Steady
Brazil of Hope	Communist Party of Brazil	1,443	0.11	0	Steady
Liberal Party		132,945	10.54	3	▲2
Progressistas		116,147	9.21	2	Steady
Brazil Union		83,208	6.60	1	New
Democratic Labour Party		72,125	5.72	1	Steady
Republicanos		69,264	5.49	1	Steady
Podemos		68,498	5.43	1	▲1
Social Democratic Party		62,621	4.96	1	Steady
Brazilian Labour Renewal Party		62,577	4.96	1	▲1
Patriota		51,532	4.09	1	Steady
Brazilian Socialist Party		44,862	3.56	0	▲1
Brazilian Labour Party		15,410	1.22	0	▼1
Solidariedade		11,595	0.92	0	▼2
PSOL REDE	Socialism and Liberty Party	7,492	0.59	0	Steady
PSOL REDE	Sustainability Network	5,971	0.47	0	Steady
Avante		2,674	0.21	0	Steady
Agir		1,555	0.12	0	Steady
Republican Party of the Social Order		1,417	0.11	0	Steady
Christian Democracy		278	0.02	0	Steady
Total		1,261,398	100.00	21	–
Valid votes		1,404,566	90.46		
Invalid votes		62,547	4.03		
Blank votes		85,541	5.51		
Total votes		1,552,654	100.00		
Registered voters/turnout		1,993,121	77.90		
