= Governorship of Eduardo Riedel =

Administration of Mato Grosso do Sul, Brazil, since 2023

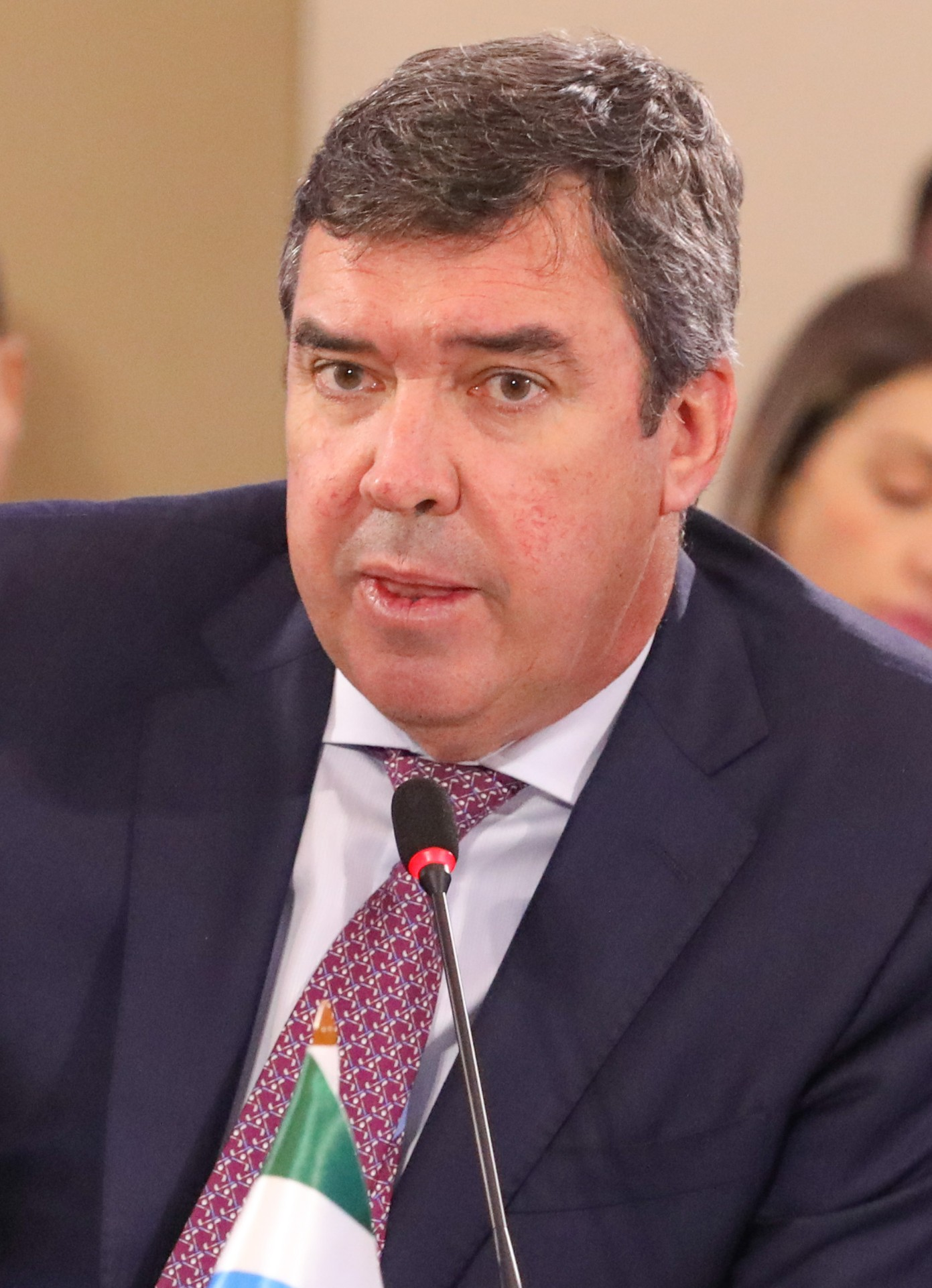
- Riedel at the National Forum of Governors in Brasília
- Government of Eduardo Riedel; 1 January 2023 – present
- Governor: Eduardo Riedel
- Party: Progressistas (since 2025); PSDB (2023–2025)
- Election: 2022; 2026
- Seat: Governorate of Mato Grosso do Sul

The government of Eduardo Riedel is the administration of Mato Grosso do Sul, Brazil, headed by Eduardo Riedel, the state's 12th governor, since 1 January 2023. Riedel was elected in the 2022 Mato Grosso do Sul gubernatorial election as a member of the Brazilian Social Democracy Party (PSDB), defeating Renan Contar in the second round with 56.90% of the valid votes. His running mate, José Carlos Barbosa, commonly known as Barbosinha, became vice-governor.

Riedel succeeded Reinaldo Azambuja, in whose administration he had served as Secretary of State for Government and Strategic Management and subsequently as Secretary of State for Infrastructure. His administration has focused on infrastructure concessions, economic development, public service modernisation, regional healthcare and cooperation with municipal governments.

In August 2025, Riedel left the PSDB and joined Progressistas (PP). His departure followed a series of defections from the PSDB and left the party without any incumbent state governors at that time.

On 4 October 2026, Riedel was re-elected governor in the first round, receiving 914,323 votes, equivalent to 67.07% of the valid votes. His second term is scheduled to begin on 1 January 2027.

== Background ==
=== 2022 gubernatorial election ===
Riedel contested the 2022 gubernatorial election as the candidate of the PSDB, with José Carlos Barbosa as his running mate. He entered the election after serving in the administration of Reinaldo Azambuja, who had governed Mato Grosso do Sul since January 2015.

In the first round, held on 2 October 2022, Riedel finished second with 361,981 votes (25.16%), advancing to a runoff against Renan Contar, known as Capitão Contar.

In the second round on 30 October, Riedel won 808,210 votes (56.90%) against Contar's 612,113 votes (43.10%). Contar had received political support from then-president Jair Bolsonaro, while Riedel's campaign emphasised continuity with Azambuja's administration.

Riedel won in 72 of Mato Grosso do Sul's 79 municipalities, while Contar led in seven.

=== Transition and inauguration ===
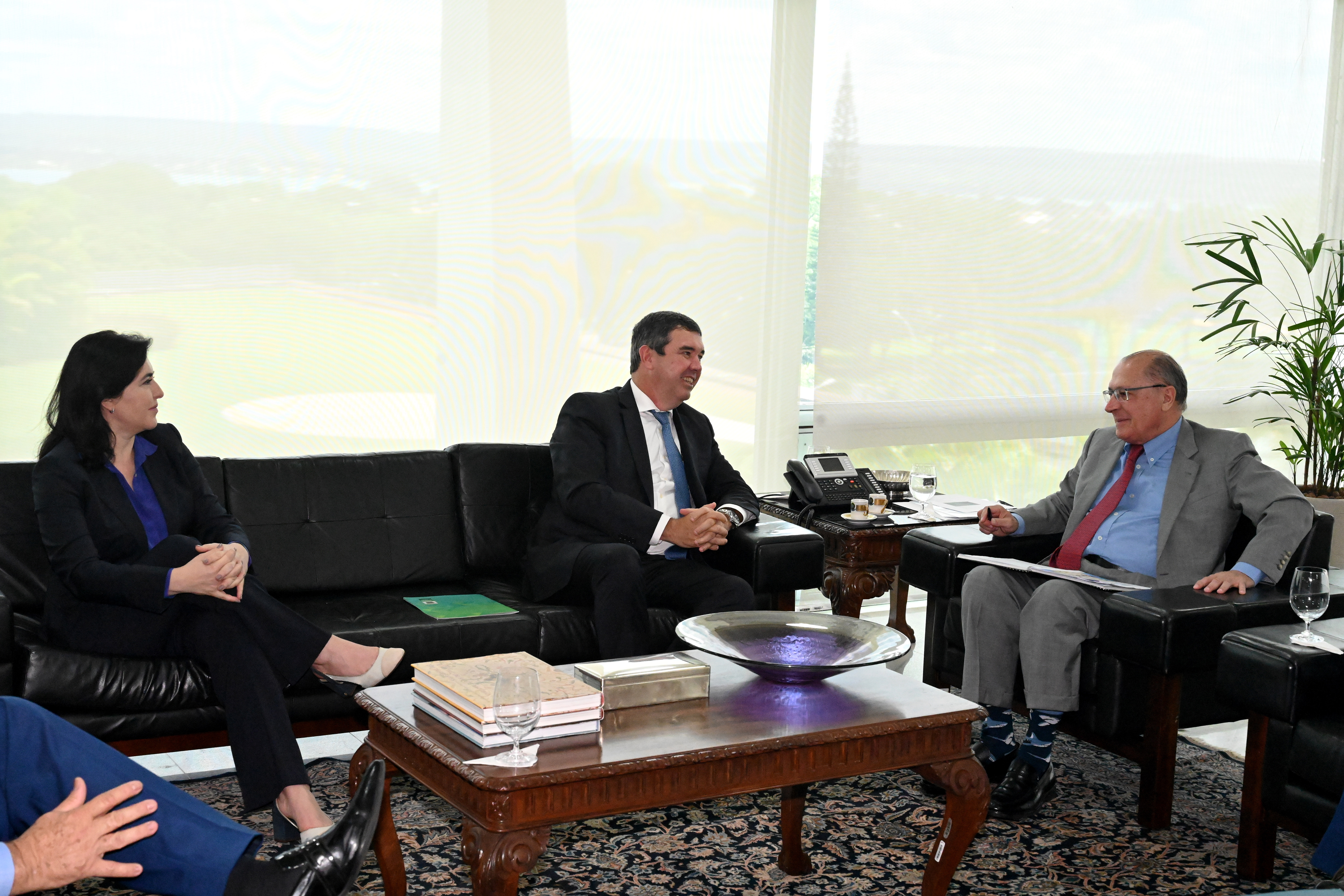
Governor Eduardo Riedel with Minister Simone Tebet and Vice-President Geraldo Alckmin in 2023.

Following his election, Riedel organised a transition team and began announcing appointments to the incoming administration in December 2022.

He took office on 1 January 2023 at the Legislative Assembly of Mato Grosso do Sul. The inauguration took place on the same day as Luiz Inácio Lula da Silva assumed his third presidential term.

The new state administration included officials retained from Azambuja's government and new appointees selected by Riedel.

== Administration ==
=== Government organisation ===
Riedel's administration initially reorganised the state executive branch into departments responsible for government coordination, finance, education, healthcare, public security, economic development, infrastructure, administration and social policies.

The government established separate areas for strategic partnerships, environmental and economic development policies, and public service administration. The cabinet underwent changes during the administration, including replacements connected with the 2026 general election.

=== Municipal government relations ===
In April 2024, Riedel launched the MS Ativo Municipalismo programme, aimed at expanding cooperation between the state administration and Mato Grosso do Sul's 79 municipal governments.

The initiative identified four priority policy areas: education, infrastructure, healthcare and social assistance. The programme was designed to coordinate state investment and municipal services, with performance targets and technical cooperation mechanisms.

The administration presented the initiative as a continuation and expansion of earlier municipal infrastructure programmes. Its proposed measures included improvements to school facilities, regional healthcare, municipal road infrastructure and social assistance services.

== Domestic policies ==
=== Education ===
Riedel's 2022 government programme proposed expanding full-time education, developing professional qualifications and strengthening links between public education and the labour market.

During his administration, education was designated one of the priority areas of MS Ativo. The programme included investments in school infrastructure, technology and cooperation with municipalities to support improvements in basic education.

In February 2026, the government announced education management targets for the year, including reducing grade repetition and continuing refurbishment work in the state school network. Education Secretary Hélio Queiroz Daher presented the targets during the signing of management agreements with the governor.

=== Healthcare ===
Healthcare regionalisation became a major component of the administration's public service agenda.

In 2025, the government presented its Nova Arquitetura da Saúde strategy, a regional healthcare organisation model intended to coordinate municipal and state facilities and improve access to specialist services.

The programme included proposals for reorganising hospital referrals and the distribution of services according to regional healthcare needs.

==== Hospital Regional de Dourados ====
On 20 December 2025, the administration inaugurated the first operational phase of the Dourados Regional Hospital, named Hospital Regional de Dourados Olga Castoldi Parizotto.

The hospital project had originally begun in 2014 and passed through the administrations of André Puccinelli and Reinaldo Azambuja before entering operation under Riedel.

Its first phase opened with 100 beds, including adult and paediatric intensive care facilities and four operating theatres. The hospital was designed to serve 34 municipalities in southern Mato Grosso do Sul, with a planned expansion to 192 beds.

The project involved investment by both the state and federal governments. It formed part of a broader strategy to expand regional access to medium- and high-complexity healthcare.

=== Infrastructure and transport ===
Infrastructure investment has been a significant area of Riedel's administration, particularly road construction and public-private concessions.

The government continued work on transport infrastructure intended to facilitate agricultural and industrial freight movements and improve connections between municipalities.

==== Rota da Celulose concession ====
On 8 May 2025, the government held a road concession auction at the B3 stock exchange in São Paulo.

The concession, known as Rota da Celulose, comprises 870.3 kilometres of federal and state roads, including sections of BR-262, BR-267, MS-040, MS-338 and MS-395.

The winning bidder was the K&G consortium, formed by Kinfra and Galápagos. The consortium offered a 9% discount on the base toll rate and an initial contribution of R$217.3 million.

The 30-year concession provides for approximately R$10 billion in projected infrastructure investment and operating expenditure. It covers transport corridors serving the pulp and paper industry and other agricultural and industrial activities in the state.

In February 2026, the concession agreement was presented at a technical event in Campo Grande attended by federal Planning Minister Simone Tebet. The project included planned road duplication, road maintenance and improvements to transport safety.

In March 2026, the concessionaire Caminhos da Celulose presented its initial operations and plans for the first 100 days of the concession to Riedel and members of the state government.

==== Pantanal infrastructure contracts ====
In July 2023, the Mato Grosso do Sul State Court of Accounts suspended 16 road construction and surfacing contracts related to projects in the Pantanal, covering approximately 608 kilometres.

Riedel responded publicly that the state government had nothing to conceal and stated that the suspension should not prevent completion of the planned infrastructure work.

=== Economic development ===
The administration's economic development policies have included attracting private investment, developing infrastructure for industrial production and supporting agricultural and forestry-related industries.

The Rota da Celulose concession was intended in part to improve freight transport from major pulp production facilities in eastern Mato Grosso do Sul, including industrial operations near Ribas do Rio Pardo and Três Lagoas.

The state's economic development secretariat has also overseen policies relating to industry, agriculture, technology and environmental regulation.

=== Social assistance and citizenship ===
The government's 2022 election platform included proposals for expanding public assistance and improving access to services for vulnerable populations, including Indigenous communities, quilombola communities and people living in remote areas.

In June 2024, the state's Justice and Public Security Secretariat and Citizenship Secretariat established a joint framework for the MS em Ação: Segurança e Cidadania programme, aimed at coordinating services for traditional communities and vulnerable populations.

Social assistance was also designated a priority area under MS Ativo, with plans to improve coordination with municipal social assistance services.

=== Public security ===
Riedel's 2022 programme proposed strengthening action against violent crime, organised crime, femicide and offences in border areas.

The administration retained Antônio Carlos Videira as Secretary of State for Justice and Public Security when it took office in January 2023.

Its public security agenda has included cooperation with other governmental departments and the coordination of services in border and remote regions.

=== Environmental policy ===
The administration's environmental policies have been closely linked to agricultural development, land use, conservation and infrastructure planning.

During the first years of the administration, Jaime Verruck headed the Secretariat of Environment, Development, Science, Technology and Innovation (Semadesc), overseeing an institutional portfolio combining economic development and environmental policy.

Verruck left the department in April 2026 to pursue a candidacy in the general election. Artur Henrique Leite Falcette, previously deputy secretary, succeeded him.

== Political developments ==
=== Departure from the PSDB ===
Although elected governor as a member of the PSDB in 2022, Riedel changed his party affiliation during his first term.

On 18 August 2025, reports confirmed that he had informed PSDB president Marconi Perillo of his decision to leave the party. His affiliation with Progressistas was formalised the following day.

Riedel's departure came after the exits of other PSDB governors, including Eduardo Leite of Rio Grande do Sul and Raquel Lyra of Pernambuco, and left the PSDB without an incumbent governor.

The change was part of the political reorganisation preceding the 2026 Brazilian general election.

=== 2026 cabinet reshuffle ===
In March 2026, the government underwent a cabinet reshuffle as members of the administration prepared to contest elections or undertake political activities.

Those leaving included Marcelo Miranda of the Tourism, Sport and Culture Secretariat, Jaime Verruck of the Environment and Economic Development Secretariat, and Viviane Luiza da Silva of the Citizenship Secretariat.

Administration Secretary Frederico Felini also left his post to undertake political organisational duties rather than stand as a candidate.

The changes were associated with Brazilian electoral rules requiring certain public officials to leave executive positions ahead of elections.

== 2026 gubernatorial election ==
Riedel sought re-election in 2026 as a member of Progressistas, having switched parties in August 2025.

The first round of the election was held on 4 October 2026. Riedel faced several candidates, including Fábio Trad of the Workers' Party (PT), João Henrique Catan of the New Party and former senator Delcídio do Amaral.

With all polling sections counted, Riedel won 914,323 votes (67.07%), defeating Fábio Trad, who received 322,807 votes (23.68%). João Henrique Catan finished third.

2026 gubernatorial election results
| Candidate | Party | Votes | Percentage |
|---|---|---|---|
| Eduardo Riedel | PP | 914,323 | 67.07% |
| Fábio Trad | PT | 322,807 | 23.68% |
| João Henrique Catan | NOVO | 98,677 | 7.24% |
Other candidates received the remaining valid votes.

A total of 1,539,009 voters participated in the election, representing a turnout of 76.12%. There were 1,363,298 valid votes, 80,522 blank ballots and 95,189 null ballots.

Riedel won an outright majority of valid votes and was therefore re-elected without a second round. His second four-year term is scheduled to run from 1 January 2027 to 31 December 2030.

== Cabinet ==
=== Initial cabinet (2023) ===
The initial administration included officials responsible for the main departments of the state executive branch. The following appointments were announced during the transition and confirmed at the beginning of the government.

| Portfolio | Officeholder |
|---|---|
| Government and Strategic Management | Pedro Arlei Caravina |
| Civil House | Eduardo Rocha |
| Finance | Flávio César Mendes de Oliveira |
| Administration | Ana Carolina Araújo Nardes |
| Education | Hélio Queiroz Daher |
| Health | Maurício Simões Corrêa |
| Justice and Public Security | Antônio Carlos Videira |
| Infrastructure and Logistics | Hélio Peluffo Filho |
| Environment, Development, Science, Technology and Innovation | Jaime Elias Verruck |
| Tourism, Sport, Culture and Citizenship | Marcelo Ferreira Miranda |
| Attorney General | Ana Carolina Ali Garcia |
| Comptroller General | Carlos Eduardo Girão de Arruda |
| Strategic Partnerships | Eliane Detoni |
| Social Assistance and Human Rights | Elisa Cléia Nobre (acting) |

=== Subsequent appointments and changes ===
The cabinet changed during Riedel's first term, including replacements in Government, Administration, Infrastructure, Civil House and economic development departments.

| Officeholder | Portfolio | Development |
|---|---|---|
| Rodrigo Perez Ramos | Government and Strategic Management | Held the position during 2025–2026 |
| Walter Carneiro Júnior | Civil House | Held the position during 2025–2026 |
| Frederico Felini | Administration | Left the government in 2026 |
| Guilherme Alcântara de Carvalho | Infrastructure and Logistics | Held the position during 2026 |
| Viviane Luiza da Silva | Citizenship | Left the government in 2026 |
| Patrícia Elias Cozzolino de Oliveira | Social Assistance and Human Rights | Held the position during 2025–2026 |
| Artur Henrique Leite Falcette | Environment, Development, Science, Technology and Innovation | Succeeded Jaime Verruck in April 2026 |

== See also ==
- Eduardo Riedel
- List of governors of Mato Grosso do Sul
- Government of Mato Grosso do Sul
- 2022 Mato Grosso do Sul gubernatorial election
- 2026 Mato Grosso do Sul gubernatorial election
