= List of lieutenant governors of Mato Grosso do Sul =

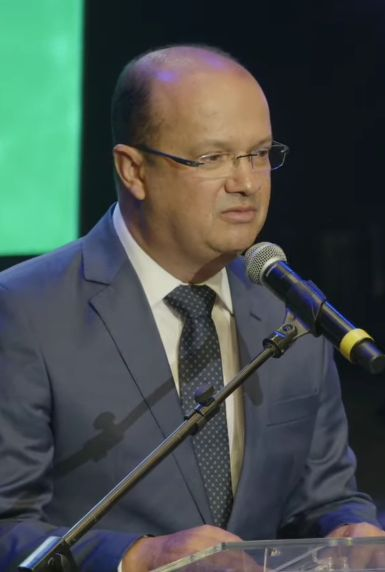
The current vice governor José Carlos Barbosa.

This is the list of Vice governors of Mato Grosso do Sul, the first to hold the position was Ramez Tebet and the most recent José Carlos Barbosa. To be vice-governor it is necessary to be Brazilian born and to be at least 30 years old.

The 1989 state constitution defines that the lieutenant governor's main function is to replace the governor in the event of occasional absences and impediments, in addition to assisting him whenever he is summoned for special missions.

Upon taking office, he takes an oath to uphold and defend the federal and state constitutions, national and state laws, the integrity of the Union and the independence of the country. The Lieutenant Governor is automatically elected along with the Governor every four years, with no votes being cast directly for him, being elected on a slate basis. This system was implemented to prevent the lieutenant governor from being from the governor's opposition party.

Despite the state being installed in 1979 with the inauguration of Harry Amorim Costa, the position of lieutenant governor was only made official with the first state elections in Brazil after more than two decades, in 1982. With his absence, the president of the Legislative Assembly was next in line of succession.

== List ==
Number	Name	Image	Beginning of term	end of term	Broken	Governor	References and notes
Military Regime of 1964 (1964-1985)
1	Ramez Tebet		March 15, 1983	May 14, 1986	Brazilian Democratic Movement Party PMDB	Wilson Barbosa Martins	
New Republic (1985–present)
	Vague		May 14, 1986	March 14, 1987		Ramez Tebet	
two	George Takimoto		March 15, 1987	March 14, 1991	PFL Liberal Front Party	Marcelo Miranda Soares	
3	Ary Rigo		March 15, 1991	January 1, 1995	PST Social Labor Party	Pedro Pedrossian	
4	Braz Melo		January 1, 1995	May 3, 1996	Brazilian Social Democracy Party PSDB	Wilson Barbosa Martins	
	Vague		May 3, 1996	January 1, 1999		Wilson Barbosa Martins	
5	Moacir Kohl		January 1, 1999	January 1, 2003	PDT Labor Democratic Party	José Orcírio Miranda dos Santos	
6	Egon Krakheche		January 1, 2003	January 1, 2007	PT Workers' Party	José Orcírio Miranda dos Santos	
7	Murilo Zauith		January 1, 2007	January 1, 2011	PFL Liberal Front Party	Andre Puccinelli	
8	Simone Tebet		January 1, 2011	January 1, 2015	Brazilian Democratic Movement Party PMDB	Andre Puccinelli	
9	Rose Modesto		January 1, 2015	January 1, 2019	Brazilian Social Democracy Party PSDB	Reinaldo Azambuja	
10	Murilo Zauith		January 1, 2019	present	DEM Democrats	Reinaldo Azambuja	
