= Rose Modesto =

Brazilian politician and educator (born 1978)

Her Excellency Rose Modesto
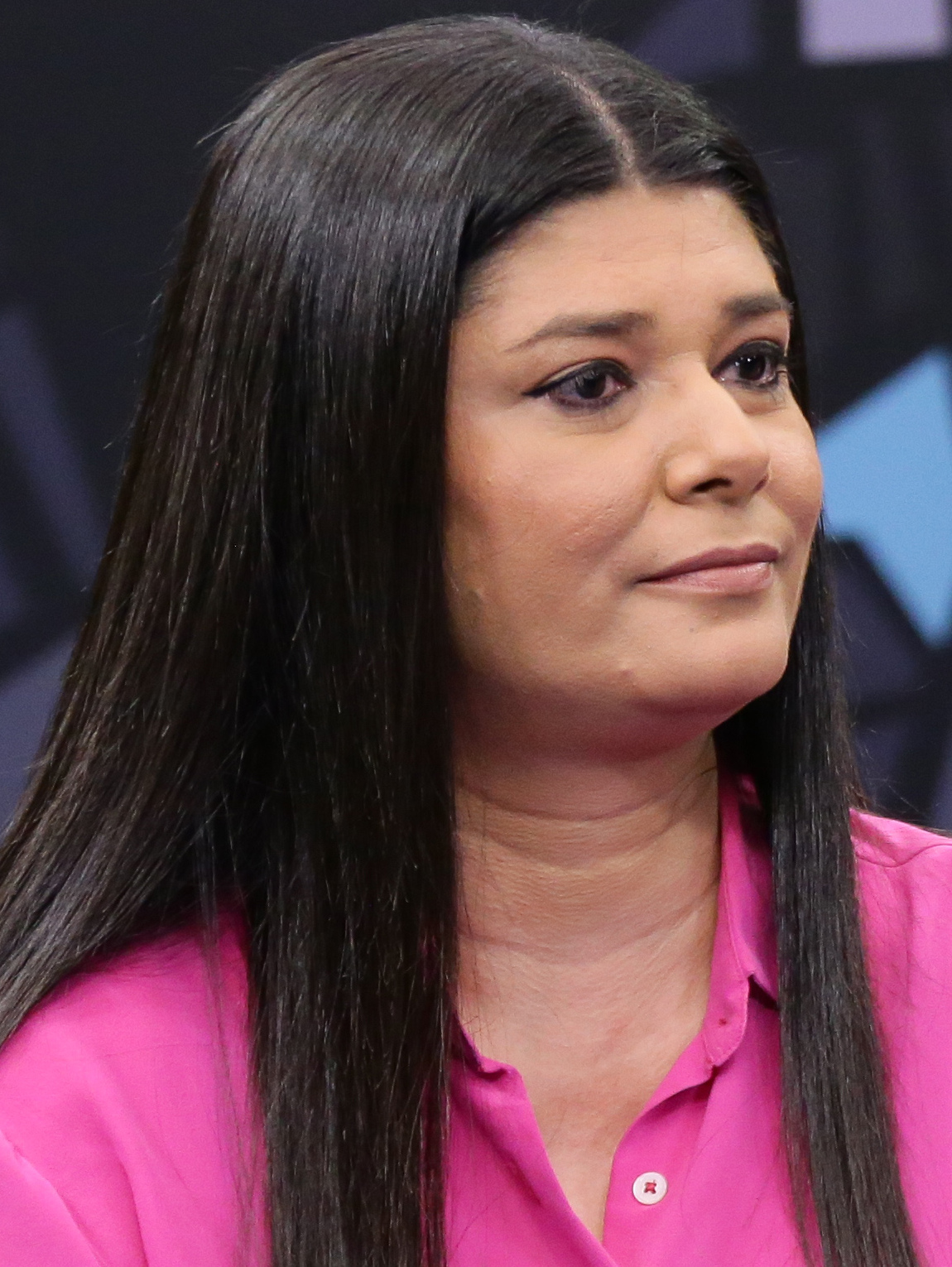
- Rose Modesto in 2019

Member-elect of the Chamber of Deputies
- Assuming office 1 February 2027
- Constituency: Mato Grosso do Sul
- In office 1 February 2019 – 1 February 2023
- Constituency: Mato Grosso do Sul

Vice Governor of Mato Grosso do Sul
- In office 1 January 2015 – 1 January 2019
- Governor: Reinaldo Azambuja
- Preceded by: Simone Tebet
- Succeeded by: Murilo Zauith

Personal details
- Born: Rosiane Modesto de Oliveira; 20 February 1978 (age 48) Fátima do Sul, Mato Grosso do Sul, Brazil
- Party: UNIÃO (2022, 2024–present)
- Other political affiliations: PPS (1997–2007); PSDB (2007–2022); Republicanos (2023–2024)
- Education: Dom Bosco Catholic University
- Occupation: Teacher

Rosiane Modesto de Oliveira (born 20 February 1978) is a Brazilian politician and educator. Modesto has held several prominent positions in the government of Mato Grosso do Sul and has been active in politics since 1997.

She served as federal deputy of Mato Grosso do Sul from 2019 to 2023. She was previously the Vice Governor of Mato Grosso do Sul from January 2015 to January 2019 in the government of Reinaldo Azambuja. Her tenure was between January 2015 and April 2016 Secretary of Human Rights, Social Assistance and Labor of Mato Grosso do Sul during the government of Reinaldo Azambuja.

Born in Fátima do Sul, she is the youngest of five children of a farming couple. Her brother, Rinaldo Modesto, is a state deputy. Rose was raised in Culturama from her birth until 1984, when her family moved to Campo Grande. In 1999, she started an undergraduate history course at the Dom Bosco Catholic University. After completing graduation, she started teaching in public schools in Campo Grande.

She began doing social work at the Padre Tomaz Girardelli Municipal School, where she created the "Learning with Music" project, and later the "Tocando em Frente" project, which currently offers art, sports and school tutoring classes.

== Councillor (2008) ==
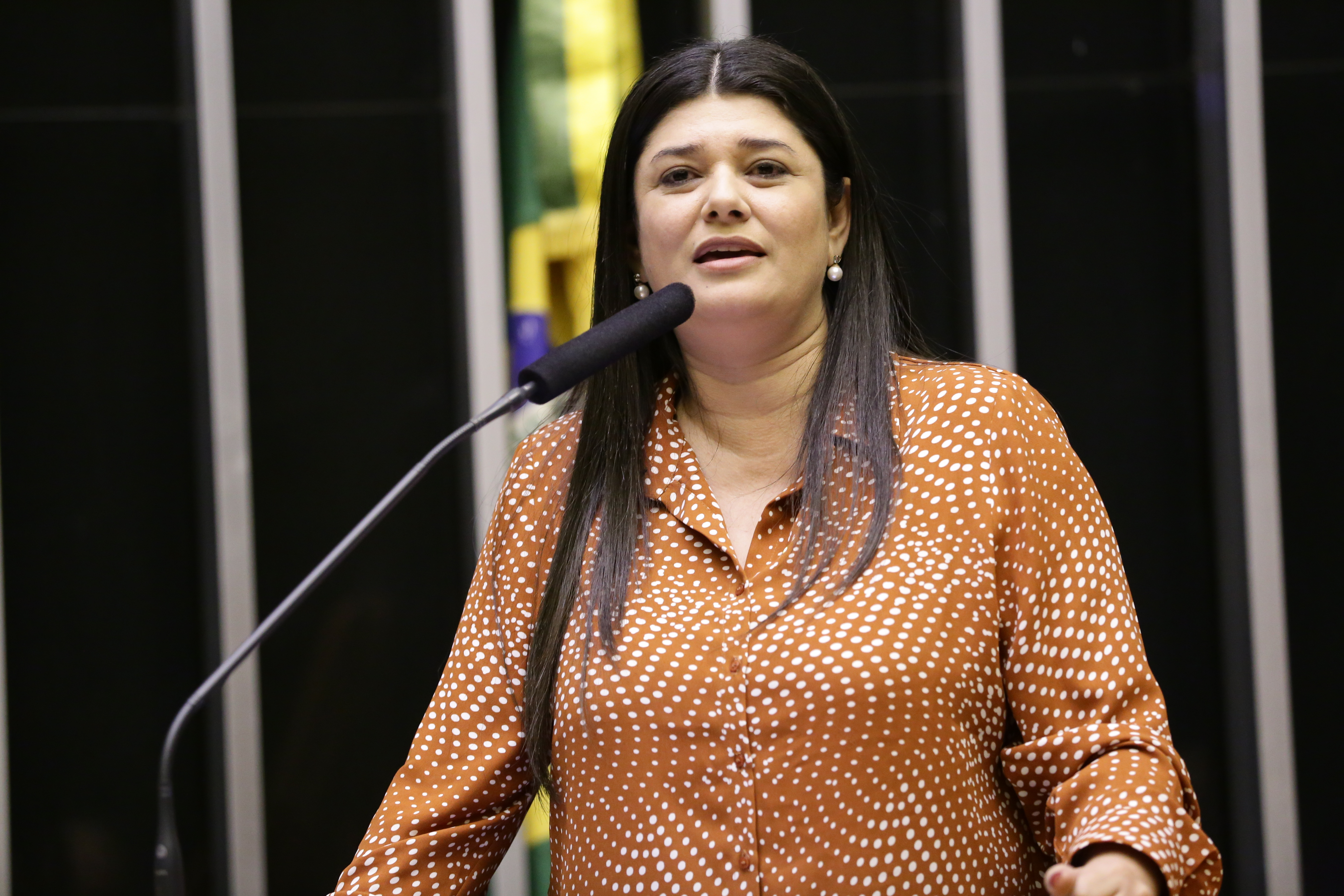

In 2008, she was elected a councillor of Campo Grande with 7,536 votes (1.87%). In 2012, she was re-elected with 10,813 votes (2.50%), being the second most voted.

== Elections in 2014 ==
On June 26, 2014, it was announced that Rose would be a candidate for Lieutenant Governor in that year's state elections of the "Novo Tempo" coalition, headed by Reinaldo Azambuja, also from the PSDB. The coalition had the support of six parties and had the second most television time. On October 6, Reinaldo and Rose were classified for the second round with 39.09% of the valid votes. On October 26, they were elected with 741,516 votes, equivalent to 55.34% of the valid votes.

== Vice Governor of Mato Grosso do Sul (2015) ==
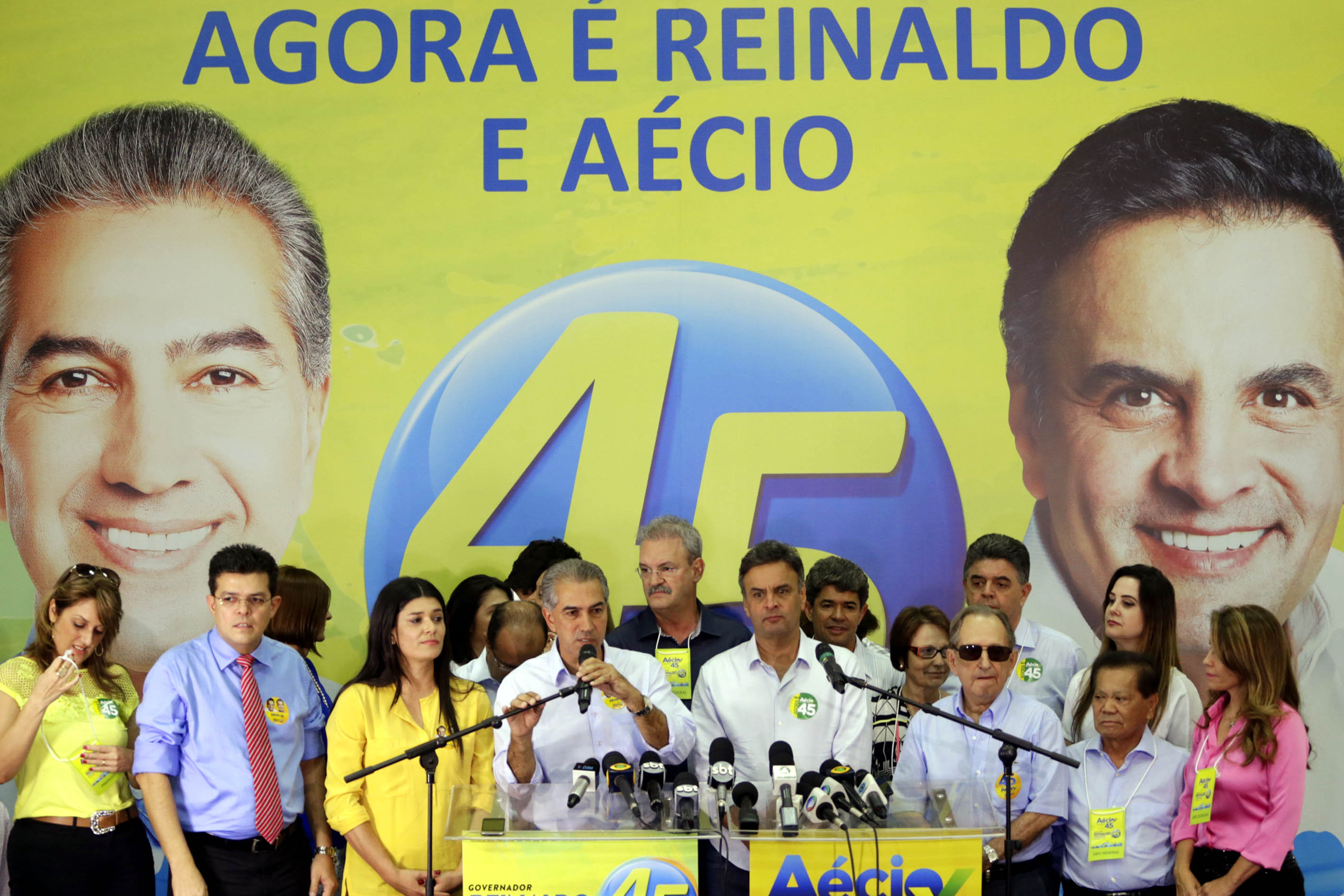

On January 1, 2015, she took office as deputy governor of Mato Grosso do Sul, succeeding Simone Tebet. In addition to her vice-governor duties, she was also appointed Secretary of State for Human Rights, Social Assistance and Labor, leaving office in April 2016 to run for the party's nomination for the candidacy for mayor of Campo Grande.

She was made officially a pre-candidate in April and formalized as a candidate in July, with the businessman and superintendent director of the Brazilian Service to Support Micro and Small Companies in Mato Grosso do Sul (Sebrae-MS) as vice on the ticket. Both qualified for the second round with 26.62% of the valid votes, but were defeated by a difference of 72,216 votes.

== Chamber of Deputies (2018) ==
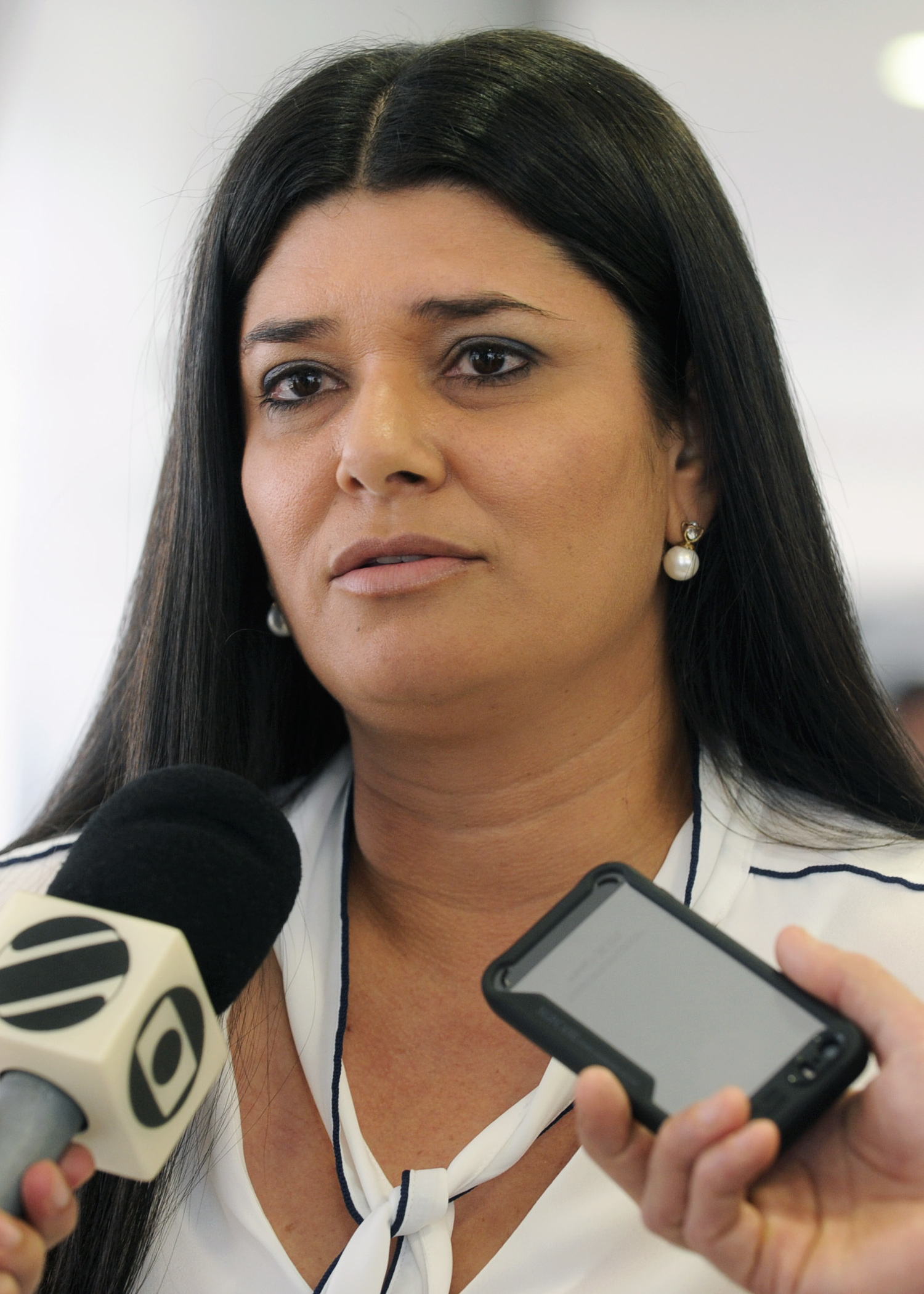
Rose Modesto in 2018

In early 2018, she declared that she would not run for re-election as Lieutenant Governor. In August, she was nominated by the party to run for a seat in the Chamber of Deputies, being elected with 120,901 votes, the highest proportional vote.

== Elections in 2022 ==
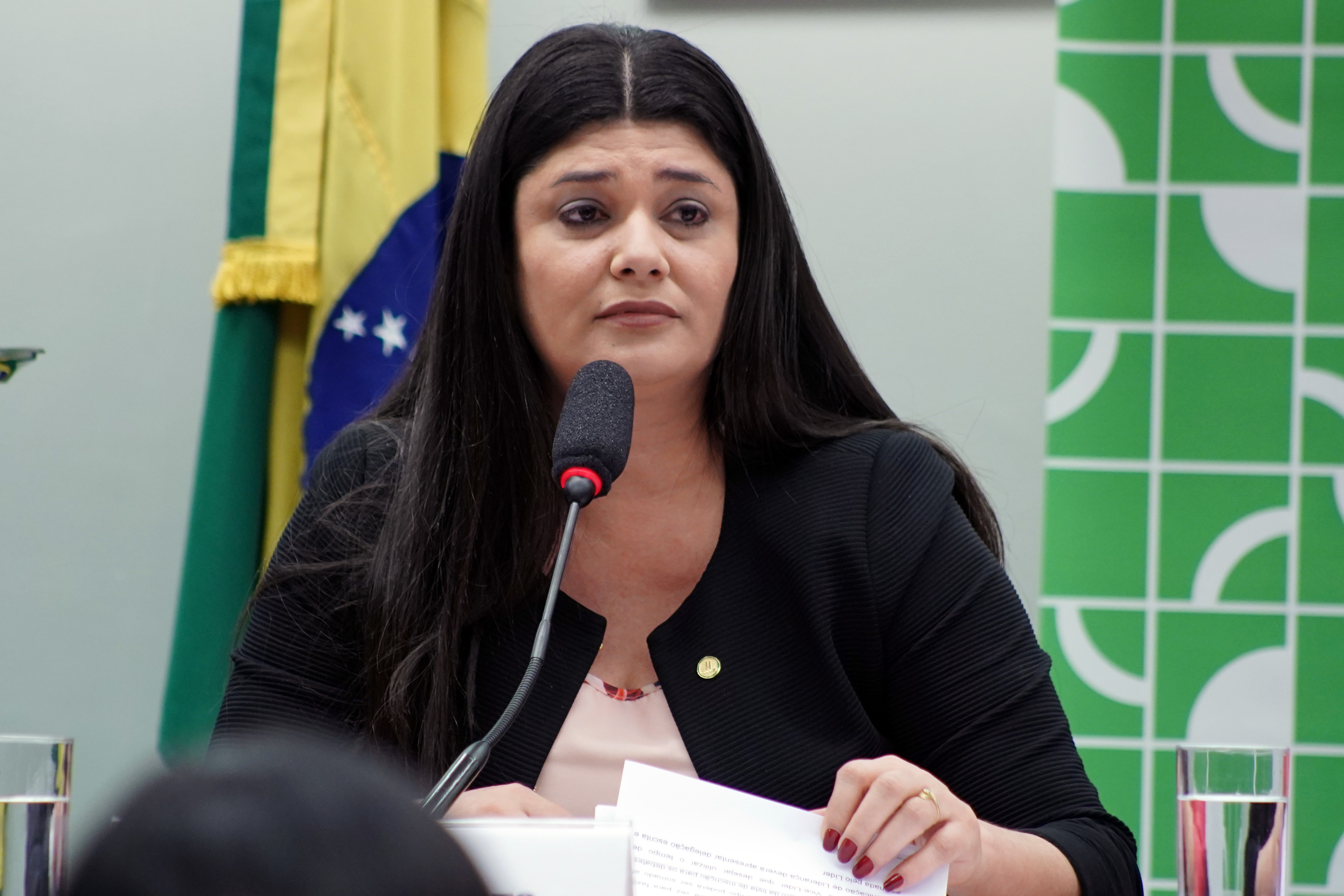
Rose Modesto in 2019

In the 2022 elections, Rose ran for governor of Mato Grosso do Sul for União Brasil (UNIÃO). With the polls totalled, she received 178,599 votes, placing 4th, out of the second round disputed by Renan Contar (PRTB) and Eduardo Riedel (PSDB).

== Controversies, complaints, and lawsuits ==
In May 2016, the State Attorney General of Justice, Paulo Passos, asked the Court of Justice to open an investigation against the deputy governor under Operation Coffee Break, which investigates an alleged corruption scheme in the impeachment process by Alcides Bernal as mayor of Campo Grande in 2014. At the time, Rose was a city councilwoman and voted for the mayor's term of office to be revoked, justifying that her vote had been technical and based on data from the Processing Commission. Regarding the procedure presented by Passos, she declared: "At no time was my vote conditioned to any type of benefit, whether of office or financial resources."

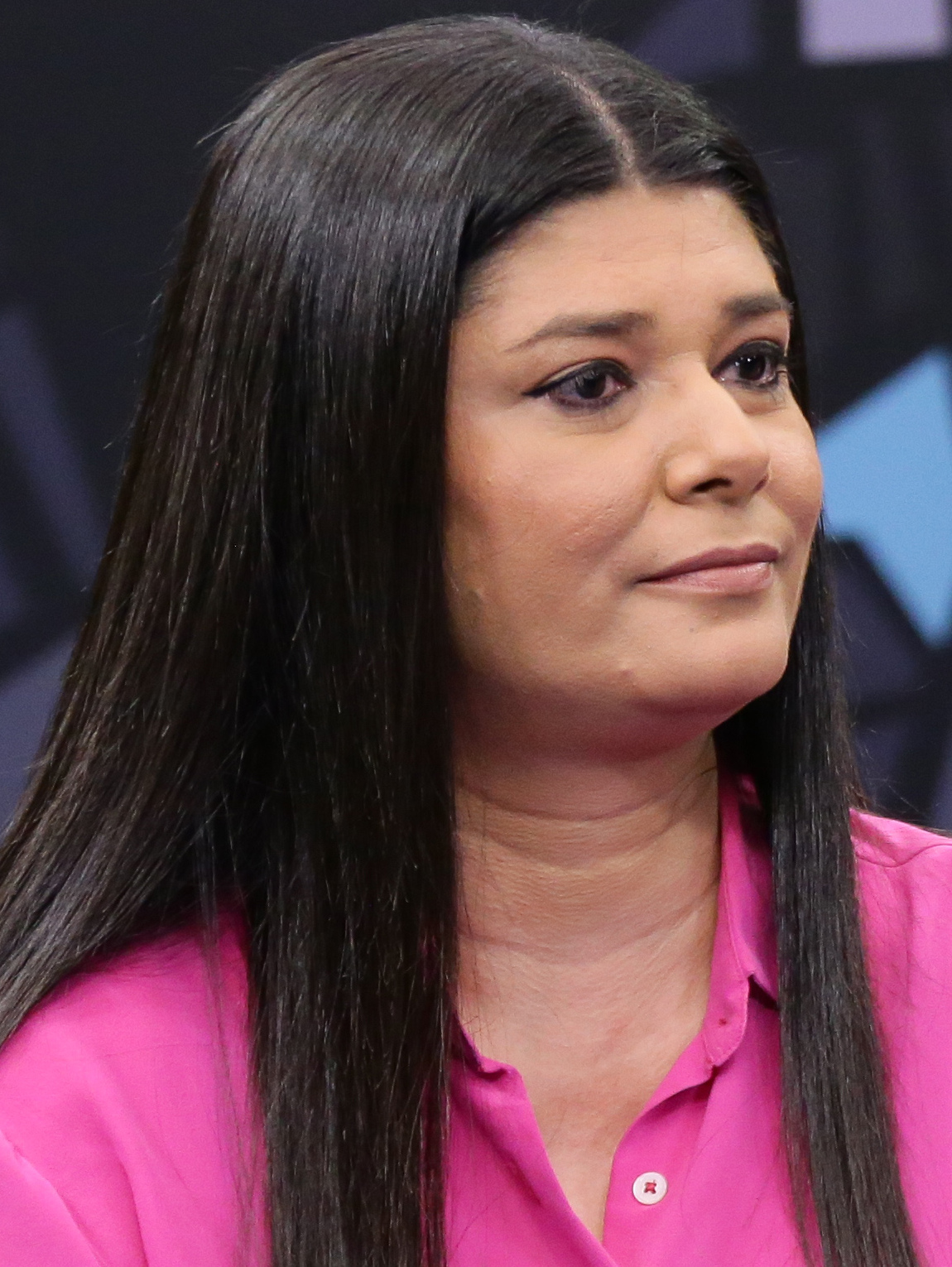

In July 2016, the state attorney general requested the breach of the vice governor's bank and tax secrecy. She denied publicizing the data and her negative certificates were made available on the campaign website. In August, when registering her candidacy for mayor of Campo Grande, Rose said she did not know how much she declared in assets and stated that she earned little. According to the Transparency Portal, the deputy governor has a salary of R$24,376.89, receiving a net amount of R$18,170.67.

Political offices
Preceded by Simone Tebet	Vice Governor of Mato Grosso do Sul; 2015–2019	Succeeded by Murilo Zauith
