= Governorship of Reinaldo Azambuja =

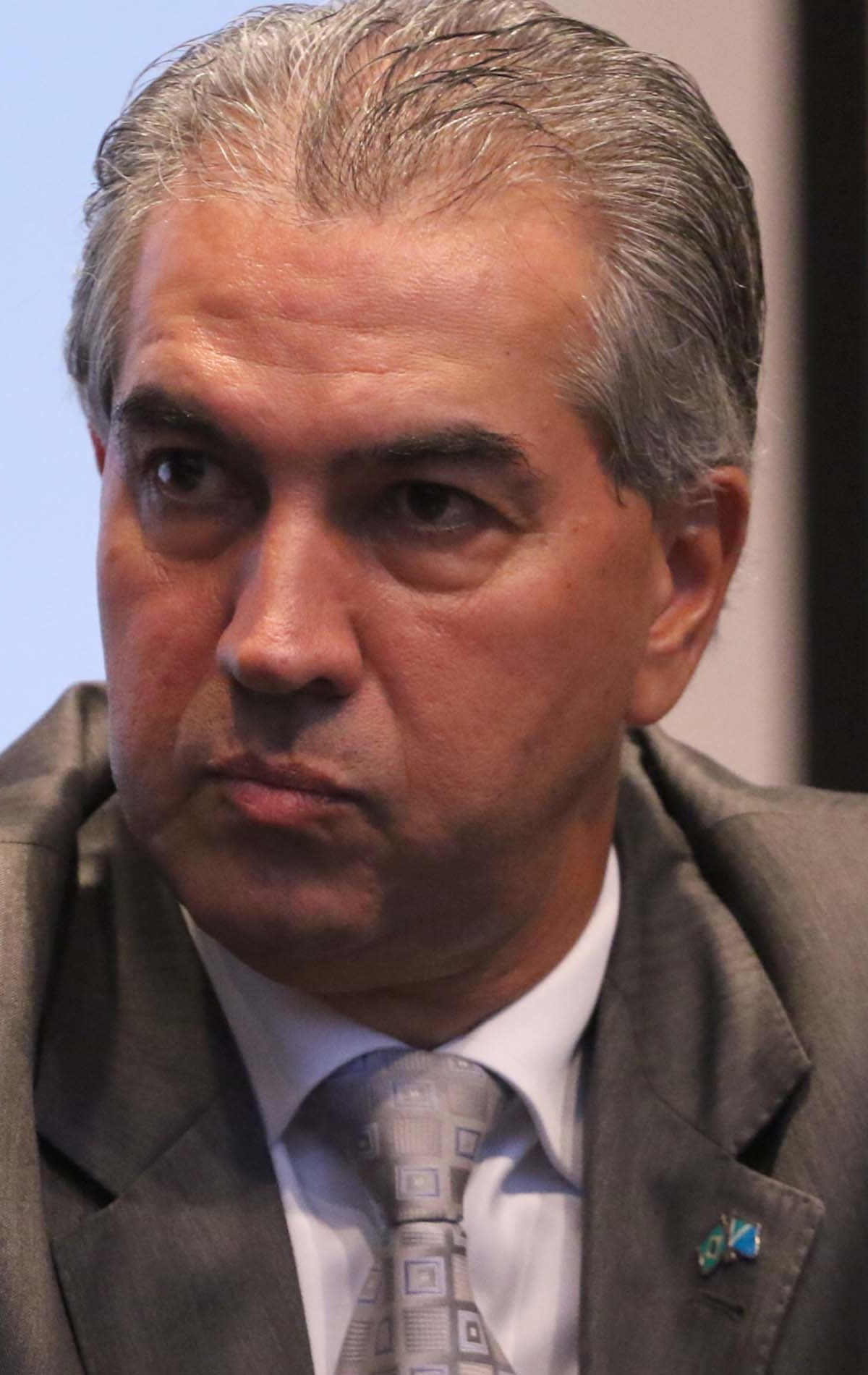
- Governorship of Reinaldo Azambuja; 1 January 2015 – 31 December 2022
- Governor: Reinaldo Azambuja
- Cabinet: See list
- Party: Brazilian Social Democracy Party
- Election: 2014
- Seat: Governorate of Mato Grosso do Sul

The Government Reinaldo Azambuja began on January 1, 2015, and will end on December 31, 2022, Reinaldo Azambuja was elected in 2014 as the 11th governor of Mato Grosso do Sul, defeating candidate Delcídio do Amaral. Azambuja was re-elected governor in the following election, in the second election he defeated Odilon de Oliveira.

Of the 24 promises made by Reinaldo Azambuja, he fulfilled 14 according to the government of Mato Grosso do Sul, with a rate of 58%, more than double the national average, which was 26%. The second best performance was from the governor of Ceará, Camilo Santana, with 47%, followed by Renato Casagrande, from Espírito Santo, who fulfilled 44% of his promises.

In the two and a half years of his second term, Azambuja as governor of Mato Grosso do Sul increased the number of full-time schools. In 2018 there were 29, and increased to 97 in July 2021. In addition, the offer of scholarships in the Vale Universidade Indígena programs was increased from 1,800 in 2018 to 2,000 in 2021. And the Bolsa Atleta and Bolsa Técnico, from 170 in 2018 to 265 in the year 2021.

== Cabinet ==
=== First term ===
In his first term, Reinaldo Azambuja's cabinet was made up of the following secretaries:

PSDB (8) / Independent (3) / PPS (1)

Secretaries of the first government of Reinaldo Azambuja
Folder	Incumbent	Broken
Administration and Debureaucratization	Charles Albert of Assisi	Brazilian Social Democracy Party
Civil House	Sergio de Paula	Brazilian Social Democracy Party
Culture, Tourism, Entrepreneurship and Innovation	Athayde Nery	Socialist People's Party
Economic Development and Environment	Jaime Verruck	Brazilian Social Democracy Party
Human Rights, Inclusion and Social Assistance	modest rose	Brazilian Social Democracy Party
Education	Maria Cecilia Amendola da Motta	Brazilian Social Democracy Party
Farm	Marcio Monteiro	Brazilian Social Democracy Party
Government and Strategic Management	Eduardo Riedel	Brazilian Social Democracy Party
Housing	Maria do Carmo Avesani	Independent
Infrastructure	Marcelo Miglioli	Brazilian Social Democracy Party
Justice and Public Security	Silvio Cesar Maluf	Independent
Health	Nelson Tavares	Independent

=== Second term ===
In his second term, Reinaldo Azambuja's cabinet was made up of the following secretaries:

PSDB (6) / Independent (3) / DEM (1)

Secretaries of Reinaldo Azambuja's second government
Folder	Incumbent	Broken
Administration and Debureaucratization	Roberto Hashioka	Brazilian Social Democracy Party
Political articulation	Sergio de Paula	Brazilian Social Democracy Party
Economic Development and Environment	Jaime Verruck	Brazilian Social Democracy Party
Human Rights, Inclusion and Social Assistance	Elisa Cléia Pinheiro Rodrigues Nobre	Independent
Education	Maria Cecilia Amendola da Motta	Brazilian Social Democracy Party
Farm	Felipe Mattos de Lima Ribeiro	Independent
Government and Strategic Management	Eduardo Riedel	Brazilian Social Democracy Party
Infrastructure	Murilo Zauith	Democrats (Brazil)
Justice and Public Security	Antonio Carlos Videira	Independent
Health	Geraldo Resende	Brazilian Social Democracy Party
