= Zeca do PT =

Brazilian politician

His Excellency Zeca do PT
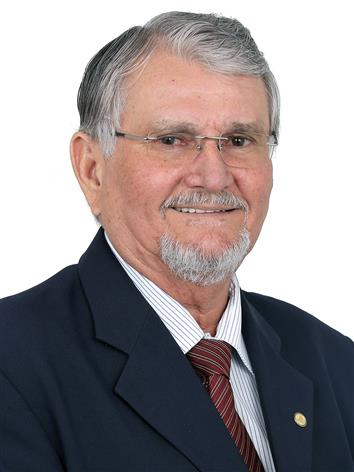
- Official photo of Zeca do PT

Governor of Mato Grosso do Sul
- In office 1 January 1999 – 1 January 2007
- Vice Governor: Moacir Kohl (1999–2003); Egon Krakheche (2003–2006)
- Preceded by: Wilson Barbosa Martins
- Succeeded by: André Puccinelli

Personal details
- Born: José Orcírio Miranda dos Santos; 24 February 1950 (age 76) Porto Murtinho, Brazil
- Spouse: Gilda Maria dos Santos
- Children: 3
- Education: Dom Bosco Catholic University
- Profession: Bank officer
- Awards: Order of Military Merit

José Orcírio Miranda dos Santos (born 24 February 1950), better known as Zeca do PT, is a Brazilian banker and politician, affiliated with the Workers' Party (PT). He was elected State Deputy of Mato Grosso do Sul by the Workers' Party in 2022. He is a former federal deputy, a former state deputy and former governor of Mato Grosso do Sul for two terms.

== Political career ==
In 1990, he became the first state deputy to be elected by the PT in the state. He was re-elected in 1994. He tried for mayor of the capital in 1992, but failed to reach the second round. He contested, in court, the result of the 1996 election, in which he lost again, this time, by only 411 votes.

He ran for governor of Mato Grosso do Sul, in the 1998 elections, jumping from 2% of the voting intentions, in the polls, to a victory of 61% of the valid votes, in the second round. He was re-elected in 2002, with 53% of the valid votes. In 2005, he was admitted by Luiz Inácio Lula da Silva, of the same party, to the Order of Military Merit in the rank of Special Grand Officer.

As governor of Mato Grosso do Sul, he updated the civil service payroll, granted teachers a significant increase, the entire road network in the State was recovered during his government, CASSEMS - Caixa de Assistência ao Servidor de Mato Grosso do Sul, has become one of the largest health plans in the state, as it currently covers more than 215,000 lives.

In the 2014 elections, he was elected federal deputy, winning 160,556 votes and taking first place. He received almost twice as many votes as his runner-up, Carlos Marun.
