= José Carlos Barbosa =

Brazilian politician (born 1964)

His Excellency Barbosinha
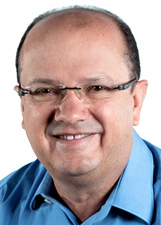

Vice-Governor of Mato Grosso do Sul
- Incumbent
- Assumed office 1 January 2023
- Governor: Eduardo Riedel
- Preceded by: Murilo Zauith

State Deputy of Mato Grosso do Sul
- In office 1 February 2015 – 1 February 2023
- Constituency: At-large

21st Secretary of State for Justice and Public Security of Mato Grosso do Sul
- In office 1 April 2016 – 9 December 2017
- Governor: Reinaldo Azambuja
- Preceded by: Silvio Maluf
- Succeeded by: Antônio Carlos Videira

Personal details
- Born: José Carlos Barbosa; 26 October 1964 (age 61) São Simão, São Paulo, Brazil
- Party: Progressistas
- Spouse: Maristela de Castro Menezes (m. 1993)
- Children: José Pedro Menezes Barbosa
- Education: University of Brasília
- Website: Official website

José Carlos Barbosa (born October 26, 1964), professionally known as Barbosinha, is a Brazilian politician and lawyer who is the 11th and current Vice-Governor of Mato Grosso do Sul in the government of Eduardo Riedel. Member of the Progressives Party, she previously served as State Deputy for Mato Grosso do Sul between 2015 and 2023 and 21st Secretary of State for Justice and Public Security of Mato Grosso do Sul from 2016 to 2017 in the government of Reinaldo Azambuja.

== Career ==
At the age of 13, Barbosa was the first official hired by the then-new municipal government in Angélica. Barbosa then moved to Dourados, where he worked as a banker and studied law at the Centro Universitário da Grande Dourados.

In 1989, at the age of 23, he became mayor of Angélica, After his term, he returned to Dourados and worked as a lawyer, banker, and university professor.

Barbosa was named to head the Empresa de Saneamento de Mato Grosso do Sul (Mato Grosso Sanitation Company) in 2007; in 2012, he was elected president of the Brazilian Association of State Sanitation Companies, the first from Mato Grosso do Sul. In 2014, he was elected state deputy in Mato Grosso do Sul; he took leave from the legislature in 2016 when he was named secretary of the state Secretariat of Justice and Public Security (Secretaria de Estado de Justiça e Segurança Pública de Mato Grosso do Sul), serving in the position for 20 months. In 2019, he was reelected as state deputy.

== Personal life ==
In 1993, he married Maristela de Castro Menezes, a doctor. The two have a son, José Pedro Menezes Barbosa.
