= Wilson Martins (politician, 1917) =

Brazilian lawyer and politician (1917–2018

His Excellency Wilson Barbosa Martins
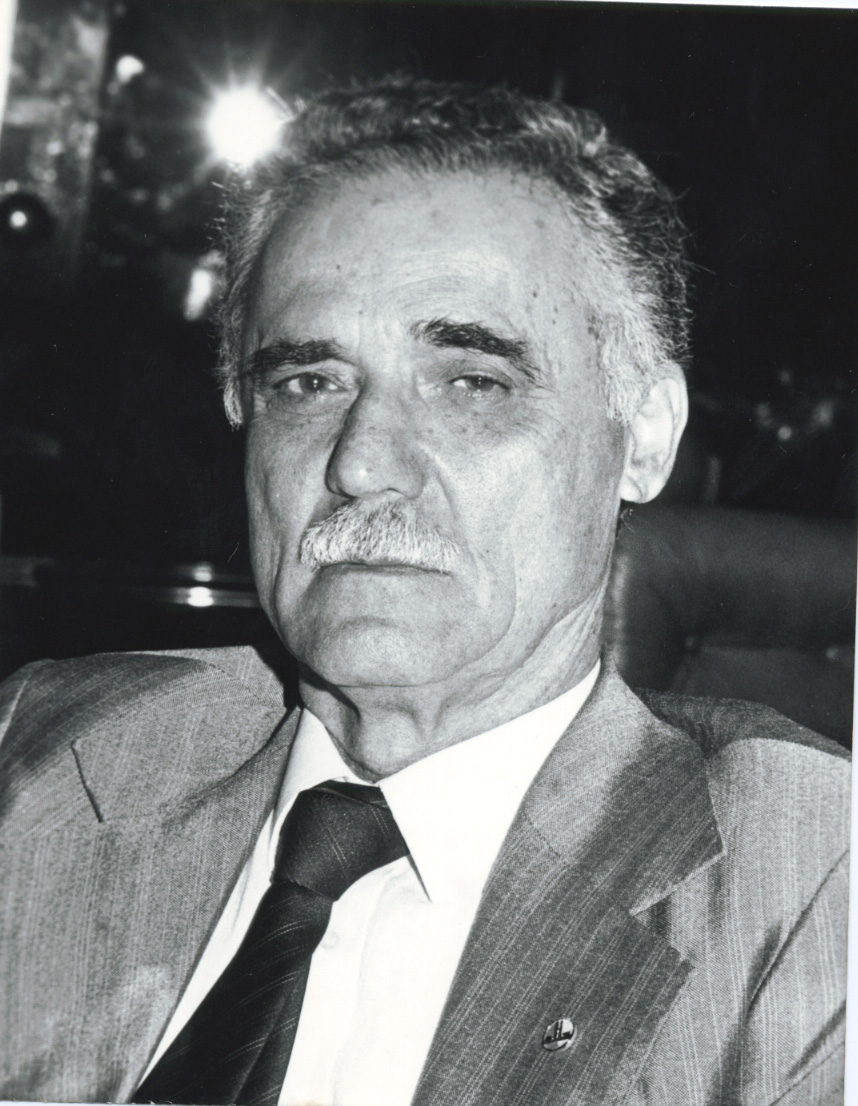

Governor of Mato Grosso do Sul
- In office 15 March 1983 – 14 May 1986
- Vice Governor: Ramez Tebet
- Preceded by: Pedro Pedrossian
- Succeeded by: Ramez Tebet
- In office 1 January 1995 – 1 January 1999
- Vice Governor: Braz Melo (1995–1996); None (1996–1999)
- Preceded by: Pedro Pedrossian
- Succeeded by: Zeca do PT

Senator for Mato Grosso do Sul
- In office 15 March 1987 – 1 January 1995

Federal deputy for Mato Grosso
- In office 15 March 1963 – 15 March 1969

44th Mayor of Campo Grande
- In office 1 February 1959 – 24 January 1963
- Preceded by: Marcílio de Oliveira Lima
- Succeeded by: Luiz Alexandre de Oliveira

Personal details
- Born: Wilson Barbosa Martins; 21 June 1917 Campo Grande, Brazil
- Died: February 13, 2018 (aged 100) Campo Grande, Brazil
- Party: UDN (1945–1965); MDB (1966–1979); MDB (1980–2018)
- Spouse: Nelly Martins
- Education: University of Sao Paulo
- Profession: Attorney
- Awards: Order of Military Merit

Wilson Barbosa Martins (21 June 1917 – 13 February 2018) was a Brazilian centenarian, lawyer and politician served as governor of Mato Grosso do Sul for two terms, senator and federal deputy for two terms, as well as mayor of the future capital Campo Grande.

Son of Henrique Martins and Adelaide Barbosa Martins, he was born at Fazenda São Pedro, an area that today corresponds to the municipality of Sidrolândia and at the time was a rural area of Campo Grande. At the age of 9, Wilson followed the family's move to the city of Entre Rios, now known as Rio Brilhante.

The first studies began with his father and then in private schools in the city. In 1929, the family returned to Campo Grande so that Wilson and his brother Ênio could continue their studies. At that time, the young man had his first contact with his future father-in-law Vespasiano Barbosa Martins.

== Education ==
With the Revolution of 1932, the family engaged in the fight against the government of then President Getúlio Vargas. Wilson's father and other relatives commanded battalions in the revolutionary new state of Maracaju. With the defeat after a few months, Vespasiano was exiled and the family returned to routine.

Two years later, the young man moved to the city of São Paulo, where he completed fundamental studies before starting a law degree. It was there that he had contact with José Fragelli, who would become governor of Mato Grosso, and fellow countryman Jânio Quadros, who was elected the most president of Brazil.

Political unrest continued after 1932. Wilson timidly involved himself in student movements, which led to his being imprisoned for a day. At the time, the group that the student identified with was considered leftist. From 1935, he became a censor of the federal government, still led by Getúlio Vargas.

He then worked in a store as a salesman until he graduated in 1939. He practiced law for a few years in an office, until he decided to return to his hometown. He opened his own office in the city until he started getting involved in politics for good.

He was also a teacher and one of the owners of Colégio Oswaldo Cruz, where he met some of those who would collaborate in his administrations.

== Personal life ==
He married the writer and artist Nelly Martins, daughter of Vespasiano. They were together for almost 60 years until his wife's death in 2003. He had three children: Thaís, Celina and Nelson.

In the 1980s, he fell out with his brother Plínio, from whom he stayed away for a long time. The two disagreed on supporting a gubernatorial candidate, Gandi Jamil. Plínio didn't want to support him, because he didn't have good relations with the Jamil family. He was also opposed to his daughter Celina's candidacy as Gandi's deputy, but accepted after she did not change her mind.

In 2013, he was hospitalized after suffering a stroke. In August 2014, he was hospitalized after a sudden illness. The following day, rumors circulated that Wilson had died, which were denied by the hospital.

During hospitalization, he underwent a tracheostomy, until he was discharged after 21 days.

In recent years, the former governor had difficulty walking due to the stroke he suffered in 2013 and did not speak because of the tracheostomy in 2014. However, he remained lucid, living with his daughter Thaís. In February 2018, he died at home, aged 100.

== Affiliation to the UDN and first election ==
He joined the National Democratic Union (UDN) when it was formed in 1945. He did not run for office, but worked to elect his friend Fragelli as state deputy. Uncle Vespasiano was elected senator by the same party in that same election.

He was in the founding group and wrote a column for the newspaper Correio do Estado. During the administration of the then mayor of Campo Grande, Fernando Corrêa da Costa, he was the general secretary of the city hall. He ran for mayoralty in 1950, but lost to Ary Coelho.

He defended improvements to Campo Grande's electricity supply. The management company of the service had its board dismissed and Wilson's group took over management. The undertaking made him known, which qualified him to run for mayoralty again, being elected in 1958. Before, he was an alternate for the then senator for Mato Grosso João Vilasboas.

== Mayor of Campo Grande ==
He takes office in January 1959, in an election marked by the coalition that brought together the UDN and the PCB. Despite being a medium-sized city, Campo Grande had a disorganized administration, which led Wilson to promote a reform with the approval of the City Council. Despite strong opposition, the reform was approved.

Promoted the first public tender in the history of municipal public administration and infrastructure works, such as building schools and asphalt paving. In 1962, he was elected federal deputy for Mato Grosso, even with the rejection of part of the UDN, which branded him a communist. At that time, a candidacy for the state government was already being considered, even before the creation of Mato Grosso do Sul.

== Congressman ==
In his first term in the Chamber of Deputies, he was a member of four Parliamentary Commissions of Inquiry (CPIs) and traveled on an official mission to Japan. With the 1964 coup and the consequent installation of the military dictatorship, he joined the Brazilian Democratic Movement (MDB) with the installation of bipartisanship.

In 1966, he refused a candidacy for the government of Mato Grosso to succeed Corrêa da Costa. On that occasion, the man who would become his main political opponent, Pedro Pedrossian, was elected. Wilson preferred to seek re-election as a congressman, and won.

In his second term, he was deputy leader of the MDB, a member of the Constitution and Justice Commission and other CPIs, in addition to making an official trip to Peru. The mood in the Chamber and in 1968, the military government granted Institutional Act Number Five (AI-5), which led to the closure of the National Congress and the withdrawal of parliamentary mandates.

His mandate was revoked in 1969 and his political rights suspended for ten years, which led him back to law.

== Back to Campo Grande ==
He returned to his hometown after the impeachment of his mandate and political rights, opening a law firm again. He remained affiliated with the MDB, not getting involved in politics. He witnessed the creation of the new state of Mato Grosso do Sul, but did not take part in the process as he was still suspended from public life. At that time, the political divergence with Pedrossian was already beginning.

He also followed the political career of his brother Plínio Barbosa Martins, and with the restoration of his political rights, he was elected the first president of the state section of the Brazilian Bar Association (OAB).

With the approach of the first direct elections for the state government, at first he articulated his brother's candidacy. Plinio discarded the idea, and the new Brazilian Democratic Movement Party (PMDB) ended up supporting Wilson to run to succeed Pedrossian, being elected in 1982.

== First elected governor of Mato Grosso do Sul ==
He takes office in March 1983, with then state deputy Ramez Tebet as deputy. Early on, he faces the challenge of overcoming the imbalance of public accounts, with functional payrolls and late contracts; being forced to take out loans and renegotiate debts with the Union.

With federal funds, it promoted infrastructure works and kept employees' salaries up to date. This first administration was marked by great works and easy credit with the Union, in addition to a secretariat composed of people linked to former governor Marcelo Miranda and others from Wilson's group.

In 1986, he resigned from office to run for a vacancy in the Federal Senate, which led Lieutenant Governor Tebet to the Governorship. He made Miranda his successor and was elected senator.

== Senator and member of the Constituent Assembly ==
In 1987, he took office as a senator, and as a member of the Constituent Assembly. Among the most diverse policies that would come to compose the current Federal Constitution, he voted in favor of protection against unfair dismissal, voting at age 16 and the expropriation of productive property. He was against the death penalty, abortion, presidentialism, and the five-year term of then-President José Sarney. He abstained on limiting external debt burdens and was absent from the vote on creating a fund to support agrarian reform and limiting the right to private property.

After the enactment of the Constitution and the reestablishment of Congress, he was a fourth-alternate member of the Senate's Board of Directors, being rapporteur for CPIs and important projects, such as Provisional Measure No. 318, which established new rules for the Housing Finance System (SFH). He traveled on an official mission to Venezuela in 1990, and in 1992, he voted in favor of the removal and then for the impeachment of the mandate of then-president Fernando Collor, who faced an impeachment process. He resigns from office in December 1994, after being elected governor of Mato Grosso do Sul again.

With an administration in crisis, he had disagreements with the then governor Marcelo Miranda, which led him to join the PSDB with his political group, remaining even after requests to reconsider from the then deputy Ulysses Guimarães. He supported the candidate Gandi Jamil, who had his daughter Celina Jallad as his vice-president, against his historic opponent Pedro Pedrossian. The result was the election of Pedrossian, who took office for the second time.

== Second time as governor ==
Elected in 1994, he assumed the position of governor for the second time in 1995, with Braz Melo as deputy. He once again took over the management of a state in financial difficulties, but this time he did not get much help from the federal government. In March 1995, Martins was admitted by President Fernando Henrique Cardoso to the Order of Military Merit in the rank of Special Grand Officer.

He continued with stopped works and started others. Faced server strikes and resource lockouts. He was one of the governors who pressured Congress and the federal government for administrative reform, in addition to the renegotiation of state debt. In 1996, he signed an agreement with the Union to reduce debt payments and supported André Puccinelli in the Campo Grande municipal elections. In the following year, he was accused of making irregular application of state resources in different areas by the former Secretary of State for Education, Aleixo Paraguassu and appointed by the national press as a candidate for re-election for his support and effort for the approval of Constitutional Amendment 16. Still in 1997, Wilson authorized the privatization of Mato Grosso do Sul Energy Company (Enersul), with the aim of obtaining funds to pay debts with the Union.

With the 1998 elections, Wilson ruled out running for re-election and then a new candidacy for the Senate, opening space for the former mayor of Campo Grande Juvêncio da Fonseca to run for a seat in the upper house of Congress.

For his succession, the then governor articulated the candidacy of then senator Lúdio Coelho, who did not obtain support from state political leaders. Senator Ramez Tebet was also not happy to try to run for government. Thus, Wilson bet on his finance secretary, Ricardo Bacha, from the PSDB.

He faced resistance from his party, the PMDB, to take Bacha's candidacy forward. Finally, the caption nominated Humberto Teixeira as Bacha's deputy.

For Wilson and other leaders, there would be a second round between Bacha and Pedrossian. However, no one predicted that PT candidate Zeca could move on to the next stage. With the support of his old opponent Pedrossian, Zeca was elected, overcoming decades of alternation between old political elites. The second round campaign was dominated by the PT's accusations against Bacha, ranging from the use of the public machine to the payment of precatories to the construction company Andrade Gutierrez, which would have supplied the toucan's campaign cash.

Wilson left office with strong rejection, without participating in the successor's inauguration ceremony and had to use police escort for a period to move around. He continued to act politically for a few years after leaving the government, but did not run for office.
