= Tereza Cristina =

Brazilian senator and former minister

- Tereza Cristina in 2023

Senator for Mato Grosso do Sul
- Incumbent
- Assumed office 1 February 2023
- Preceded by: Simone Tebet

Member of the Chamber of Deputies
- In office 31 March 2022 – 1 February 2023
- In office 1 February 2015 – 1 February 2019
- Constituency: Mato Grosso do Sul

Minister of Agriculture, Livestock and Supply
- In office 1 January 2019 – 31 March 2022
- President: Jair Bolsonaro
- Preceded by: Blairo Maggi
- Succeeded by: Marcos Montes

Mato Grosso do Sul Secretary of Agrarian Development, Production, Industry, Trade and Tourism
- In office 1 January 2007 – 7 April 2014
- Governor: André Puccinelli
- Preceded by: João Crisóstomo Mauad Cavallero
- Succeeded by: Paulo Engel

Personal details
- Born: Tereza Cristina Corrêa da Costa Dias; 6 July 1954 (age 72) Campo Grande, Mato Grosso do Sul, Brazil
- Party: PP (2022–present)
- Other political affiliations: PSDB (2003–13); PSB (2013–17); DEM (2017–22); UNIÃO (2022)
- Education: Federal University of Viçosa
- Occupation: Agronomic engineer, entrepreneur

Tereza Cristina Corrêa da Costa Dias (born 6 July 1954) is a Brazilian entrepreneur, agronomic engineer, and politician, member of the Progressistas (PP). She has been a Federal Deputy since 2015, representing the state of Mato Grosso do Sul, and is a member of the congressional ruralist front. In November 2018, Jair Bolsonaro, as president-elect, announced that she would be Minister of Agriculture, Livestock and Supply and the first woman to compose the new government, which was inaugurated on 1 January 2019. She was appointed by a group of 20 members of the Farming Parliamentary Front (FPA). In the 2022 elections, Cristina was elected Senator for the state of Mato Grosso do Sul, having resigned from the Cabinet of Jair Bolsonaro.

== Biography ==
Tereza Cristina Corrêa da Costa Dias was born in Campo Grande, Mato Grosso do Sul, and received a bachelor's degree in agronomy from the Federal University of Viçosa. Tereza Cristina was Secretary of Agrarian Development, Production, Industry, Trade and Tourism of Mato Grosso do Sul during the governorship of André Puccinelli (PMDB).

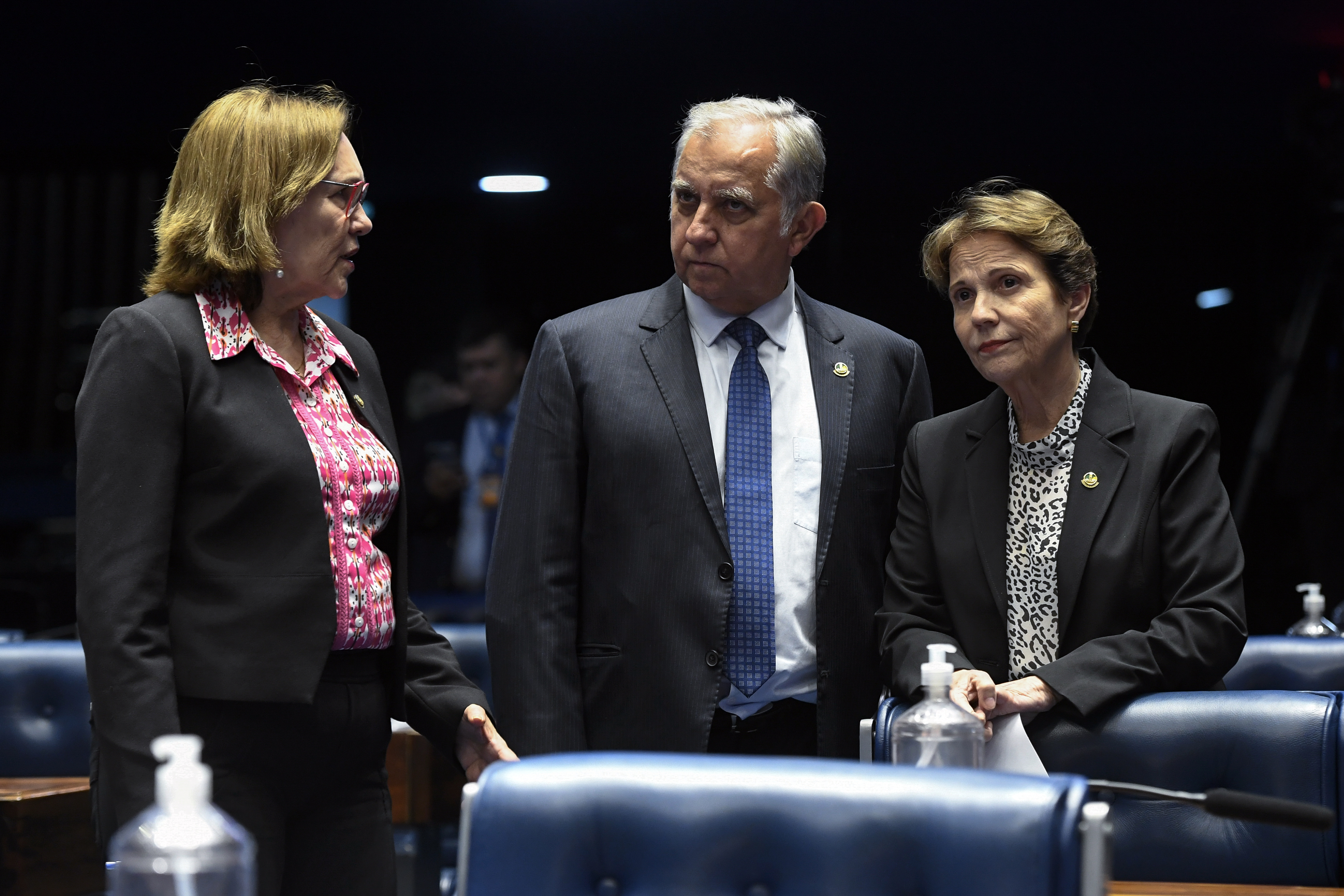
Zenaide Maia, Izalci Lucas and Tereza Cristina in 2023

In the Mato Grosso do Sul state elections in 2014, she was elect Federal Deputy with 75,149 votes. In January 2017, Tereza was elected Leader of the Brazilian Socialist Party (PSB) in the Chamber of Deputies, defeating Deputy Tadeu Alencar (PE) with 22 to 14 votes. Therefore, she became leader of a group of 36 deputies.

She left PSB in October 2017 after the party joined the opposition to president Michel Temer. Other deputies followed her, like Fabio Garcia (MT), Adilton Sachetti (MT) and Danilo Forte (CE), as well as Minister of Mines and Energy Fernando Coelho Filho. In December, she joined the Democrats (DEM), party of the President of the Chamber Rodrigo Maia (RJ).

In 2018, Tereza Cristina headed a Chamber special committee that approved Bill 6,299, aimed at ending regulations on many pesticides in the country.

== See also ==
- Ministry of Agriculture, Livestock and Supply
- Democrats

Political offices
Preceded by João Crisóstomo Mauad Cavallero	Mato Grosso do Sul Secretary of Agrarian Development, Production, Industry, Trade and Tourism; 2007–2017	Succeeded by Paulo Engel
Preceded by Blairo Maggi	Minister of Agriculture, Livestock and Supply; 2019–2022	Succeeded by Marcos Montes
