= Murilo Zauith =

Brazilian politician

His Excellency Murilo Zauith
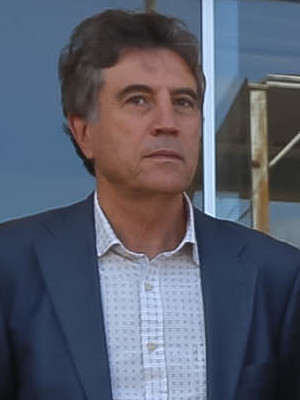
- Murilo in 2015

7th and 10th Vice Governor of Mato Grosso do Sul
- In office 1 January 2019 – 31 December 2022
- Governor: Reinaldo Azambuja
- Vice Governor: José Carlos Barbosa
- Preceded by: Rose Modesto
- Succeeded by: José Carlos Barbosa
- In office January 1, 2007 – December 31, 2010
- Governor: André Puccinelli
- Preceded by: Egon Krakheche
- Succeeded by: Simone Tebet

Personal details
- Born: Murilo Zauith; 17 July 1950 (age 76) Barretos, São Paulo, Brazil
- Party: Brazil Union
- Spouse: Cecília Zauith

Murilo Zauith (born 17 July 1950) is a Brazilian politician who served as Lieutenant Governor of Mato Grosso do Sul from 2019 to 2023 in the second government of Reinaldo Azambuja, he already held the same position between 2007 and 2010 in the government of André Puccinelli.

== Biography ==
Businessman in the city of Dourados, he owns the University Center of Grande Dourados (Unigran), one of the largest colleges in Mato Grosso do Sul.

== Political career ==
He was state deputy for two terms (1995 - 1999/1999 - 2003) and federal deputy for one (2003 - 2007). He ran for mayor of Dourados in 2000 and 2008, when he was won by Laerte Tetila and Ari Artuzi, respectively. He was elected lieutenant governor in 2006, alongside André Puccinelli.

He disputed the elections for the Senate in 2010, placing third, with 21.61% of the votes, behind Delcídio do Amaral of the Workers' Party (PT), and Waldemir Moka, of the Brazilian Democratic Movement Party (PMDB).

In the third attempt, he was elected mayor of the city of Dourados, with 80.06% of the valid votes, receiving a total of 70,906 votes; being reelected in the 2012 elections.

In the 2018 elections, he was again elected vice-president, this time with Reinaldo Azambuja. The following year, he took over as Secretary of State for Infrastructure.
