= Eduardo Riedel =

Brazilian politician (born 1969)

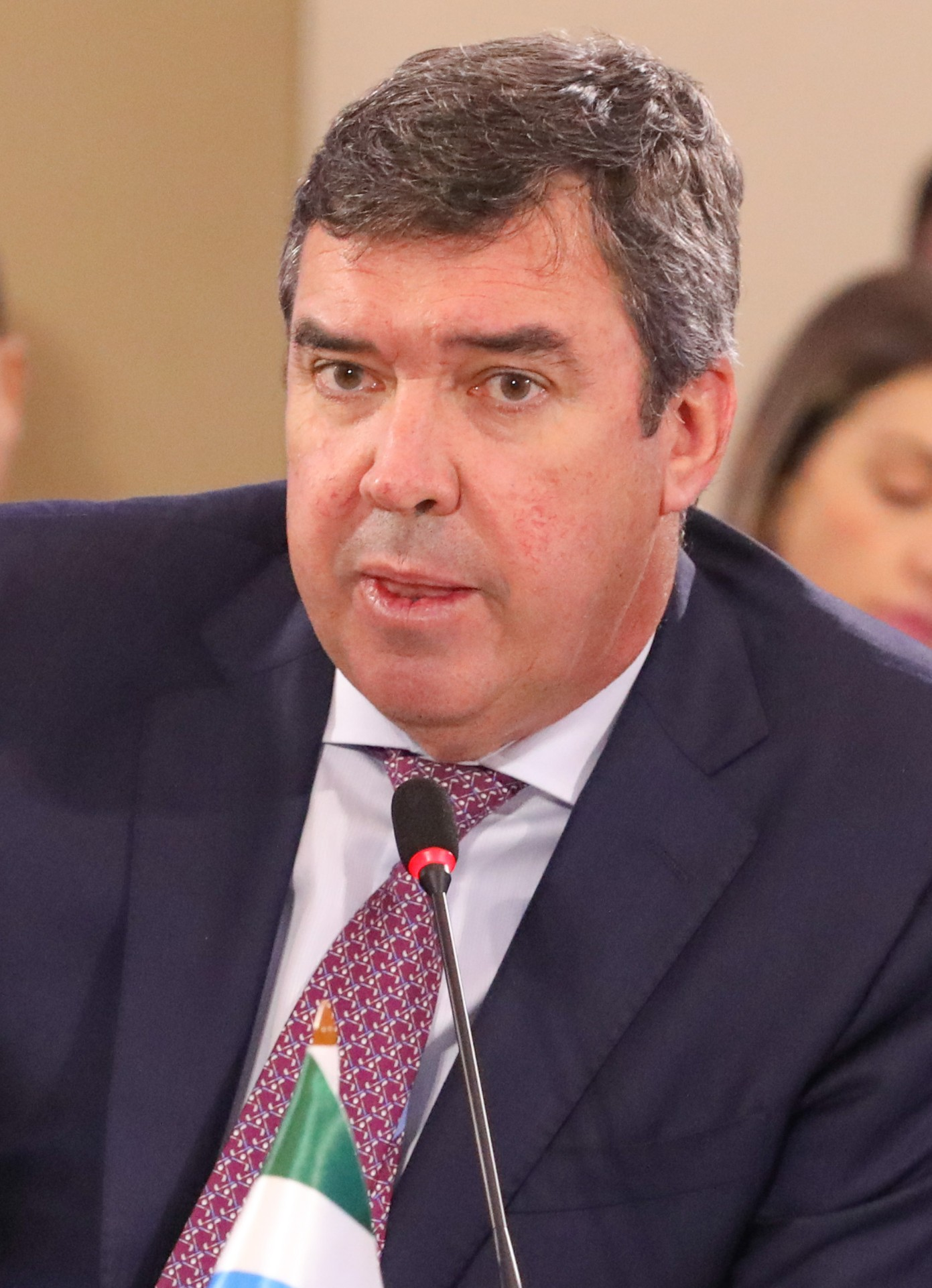
- Riedel at the National Forum of Governors in Brasília

12th Governor of Mato Grosso do Sul
- Incumbent
- Assumed office 1 January 2023
- Vice Governor: José Carlos Barbosa
- Preceded by: Reinaldo Azambuja

Vice-president of the Brazilian Social Democracy Party
- Incumbent
- Assumed office 3 February 2023

Secretary of State for Infrastructure of Mato Grosso do Sul
- In office 22 February 2021 – 2 April 2022
- Governor: Reinaldo Azambuja
- Preceded by: Luís Roberto Martins de Araújo (interim)
- Succeeded by: Renato Marcílio da Silva

Secretary of State for Government and Strategic Management of Mato Grosso do Sul
- In office 1 January 2015 – 22 February 2021
- Governor: Reinaldo Azambuja
- Preceded by: Carlos Roberto de Marchi
- Succeeded by: Sérgio Murilo Mota

Personal details
- Born: Eduardo Corrêa Riedel; 5 July 1969 (age 57) Rio de Janeiro, Brazil
- Party: Progressistas (since 2025)
- Other political affiliations: PSDB (until 2025)
- Spouse: Mônica Morais (m. 1994)
- Children: 2
- Education: Federal University of Rio de Janeiro
- Occupation: Politician; Businessman; Rural producer
- Website: eduardoriedel.com.br

Eduardo Corrêa Riedel (born 5 July 1969) is a Brazilian politician, businessman and rural producer who has served as the 12th Governor of Mato Grosso do Sul since 1 January 2023. A member of Progressistas (PP) since August 2025, he was previously affiliated with the Brazilian Social Democracy Party (PSDB), under which he was elected governor in 2022.

Riedel was re-elected governor in the first round of the 2026 Mato Grosso do Sul gubernatorial election on 4 October 2026, receiving 914,323 votes (67.07% of the valid votes). His second term is scheduled to begin on 1 January 2027.

Before entering elected office, Riedel served in the state administration of Reinaldo Azambuja as Secretary of Government and Strategic Management from 2015 to 2021 and Secretary of Infrastructure from 2021 to 2022. He previously held leadership positions in agricultural organisations, including the Federation of Agriculture and Livestock of Mato Grosso do Sul (Famasul).

== Early life and education ==
Eduardo Corrêa Riedel was born in Rio de Janeiro on 5 July 1969, the son of Seila Garcia Corrêa and Nelson Riedel. He attended the Federal University of Rio de Janeiro and undertook further studies at Fundação Getulio Vargas and INSEAD.

In 1995, Riedel assumed management of his family's rural property in Maracaju, Mato Grosso do Sul. His early career was associated with agricultural production and business administration.

== Agricultural and business career ==
Riedel became president of the Rural Union of Maracaju in 1999. He subsequently held leadership positions in the agricultural sector, including vice-president of the Federation of Agriculture and Livestock of Mato Grosso do Sul (Famasul) and director of the Brazilian Confederation of Agriculture and Livestock (CNA).

Between 2012 and 2014, he served as president of Famasul. He also held a leadership position at the state deliberative council of Sebrae/MS, the regional branch of the Brazilian Micro and Small Business Support Service.

== Political career ==
=== State government secretary (2015–2022) ===
Riedel entered the government of Mato Grosso do Sul in January 2015, when Governor Reinaldo Azambuja appointed him Secretary of State for Government and Strategic Management.

He held the position for approximately six years, serving during Azambuja's first and second administrations. His responsibilities included government planning, coordination and strategic management.

On 22 February 2021, Azambuja announced a cabinet reshuffle in which Riedel was transferred to the Secretariat of Infrastructure. Sérgio Murilo Mota replaced him as Secretary of Government and Strategic Management.

During the COVID-19 pandemic, Riedel participated in the coordination of state government policies. The administration developed the Health and Safety Programme for the Economy, known as Prosseguir, to guide decisions about economic activity and public-health restrictions using epidemiological indicators.

As Secretary of Infrastructure, Riedel was responsible for coordinating public works and infrastructure programmes, including projects associated with the state government's Governo Presente initiative.

He left the state government in 2022 to contest the gubernatorial election.

=== 2022 gubernatorial election ===
Riedel was selected as the PSDB candidate for governor of Mato Grosso do Sul in the 2022 Brazilian general election. His running mate was José Carlos Barbosa, commonly known as Barbosinha.

In the first round, held on 2 October 2022, Riedel received 361,981 votes, equivalent to 25.16% of the valid votes. He finished second behind Renan Contar and advanced to the runoff.

The second round took place on 30 October 2022. Riedel defeated Contar with 808,210 votes (56.90%), compared with 612,113 votes (43.10%) for his opponent. He was elected to succeed Reinaldo Azambuja.

=== Governor of Mato Grosso do Sul (2023–present) ===
==== Inauguration ====
Riedel took office as governor of Mato Grosso do Sul on 1 January 2023. His inauguration was held at the Legislative Assembly of Mato Grosso do Sul, with José Carlos Barbosa assuming the office of vice-governor.

In December 2022, Riedel announced members of his cabinet, retaining several officials from the previous administration while appointing new members to the state government.

==== Infrastructure and transport ====
In July 2023, the Mato Grosso do Sul State Court of Accounts suspended 16 contracts related to road construction and surfacing projects in the Pantanal, involving approximately 608 kilometres of roads. Riedel responded that the state government had nothing to conceal and maintained that the suspension would not prevent the completion of the projects.

In May 2025, the state government held an auction at B3 for the Rota da Celulose road concession, covering approximately 870.3 kilometres of roads in Mato Grosso do Sul. The concession includes sections of federal highways BR-262 and BR-267 and state highways MS-040, MS-338 and MS-395, with a duration of 30 years.

The concession was associated with approximately R$10.1 billion in projected capital expenditure and operating costs over its duration, including R$6.9 billion for capital expenditure and R$3.2 billion for operating costs.

In March 2026, the concessionaire presented its initial activities and operational planning to Riedel. The concessionaire was responsible for operating and maintaining the contracted road network.

==== Political affiliation ====
Riedel was elected governor as a member of the Brazilian Social Democracy Party. In February 2023, he was appointed to a vice-presidential position in the party's national leadership.

On 19 August 2025, he formalised his affiliation with Progressistas (PP), leaving the PSDB after more than a decade in the party. His departure left the PSDB without a sitting state governor at the time.

==== 2026 gubernatorial election ====
Riedel ran for re-election in the 2026 Brazilian general election as a member of Progressistas. His running mate was the incumbent vice-governor, José Carlos Barbosa of Republicans. The ticket contested the election under the coalition Fazendo o Futuro Acontecer.

In the first round on 4 October 2026, Riedel was re-elected with 914,323 votes (67.07% of the valid votes). His principal opponent, Fábio Trad of the Workers' Party (PT), received 322,807 votes (23.68%). João Henrique Catan of the New Party placed third with 98,677 votes (7.24%).

Other candidates included Delcídio Amaral (PRD), Renato Gomes (DC), Lucien Rezende (PSOL), Daniel Lemes (PCO) and Jeferson Bezerra (Agir).

Of the 1,539,009 voters who participated, 1,363,298 cast valid votes, 80,522 cast blank ballots and 95,189 cast null ballots. Voter turnout was 76.12%, with abstention at 23.88%.

Riedel's victory was confirmed with all polling sections counted. He secured another four-year term without a runoff election, scheduled to begin on 1 January 2027.

== Personal life ==
Riedel married Mônica Morais in 1994. They have two children, Marcela and Rafael.

== Electoral history ==
=== Gubernatorial elections ===
Election	Party	Round	Votes	Percentage	Result
2022	PSDB	First	361,981	25.16%	Runoff
2022	PSDB	Second	808,210	56.90%	Elected
2026	PP	First	914,323	67.07%	Re-elected

Sources: Election coverage and results published by G1, Folha de S.Paulo and Correio Braziliense, using electoral data from the Superior Electoral Court.

== See also ==
- List of governors of Mato Grosso do Sul
- Government of Eduardo Riedel
- 2022 Mato Grosso do Sul gubernatorial election
- 2026 Mato Grosso do Sul gubernatorial election
- Politics of Mato Grosso do Sul

Political offices
Preceded by Reinaldo Azambuja	Governor of Mato Grosso do Sul; 2023–present	Incumbent
