= Government of Mato Grosso do Sul =

- Governo do Mato Grosso do Sul

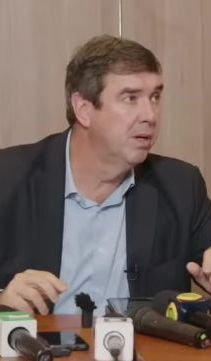
- Incumbent; Eduardo Riedel since 1 January 2023
- Inaugural holder: Harry Amorim Costa
- Formation: 1 January 1979
- Website: www.ms.gov.br

The government of Mato Grosso do Sul is led by the Governor of Mato Grosso do Sul, Brazil, and is elected by the local population through popular suffrage and direct secret ballot for a four-year term. The current governor is Eduardo Riedel. Its seat is the governorate of Mato Grosso do Sul, which has been the seat of the government of Mato Grosso do Sul since 1983.

The governor has no residence and lives in his own house. Like the Republic, Mato Grosso do Sul is governed by three powers, the executive is represented by the governor, the legislature is represented by the Legislative Assembly of Mato Grosso do Sul and the judiciary is represented by the court of Mato Grosso do Sul. Judge of the State of Mato Grosso do Sul.

== Executive ==
- Governor: Reinaldo Azambuja
- Vice Governor: Murilo Zauith

=== Current secretaries of state ===
-	Secretary	Secretary of State
1	Administration and Debureaucratization	Roberto Hashioka
2	State Comptroller General	Carlos Eduardo Girão de Arruda
3	Human Rights, Social Assistance and Labor	Elisa Pinheiro Rodrigues Nobre
4	Education	Maria Cecilia Amendola da Motta
5	Farm	Felipe Mattos
6	Government and Strategic Management	Eduardo Riedel
7	Infrastructure	Murilo Zauith
8	Justice and Public Safety	Antonio Carlos Videira
9	Environment, Economic Development, Production and Family Agriculture	Jaime Verruck
—	State Attorney General	Fabiola Marquetti
10	Health	Geraldo Resende

== Legislative ==
The Legislative Power of Mato Grosso do Sul is unicameral, constituted by the Legislative Assembly of the State of Mato Grosso do Sul, located in the Guaicurus Palace. It is made up of 24 deputies, who are elected every 4 years.

- President: Paulo Correa

== Judiciary ==
The highest court of the South Mato Grosso Judiciary is the Court of Justice of the State of Mato Grosso do Sul, based in Parque dos Poderes. It has districts in all 79 municipalities of the state with their respective Forums, which are the headquarters of each District.

- President: Paschoal Carmello Leandro
