= Renan Contar =

Brazilian politician

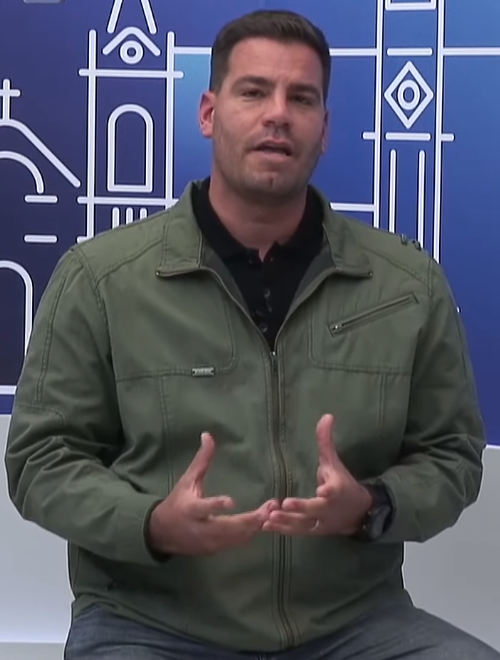

State Deputy of Mato Grosso do Sul
- In office 1 February 2019 – 1 February 2023
- Constituency: At-large

Personal details
- Born: Renan Barbosa Contar; 25 December 1983 (age 42) Campinas, São Paulo, Brazil
- Party: PRTB (2022–present)
- Other political affiliations: UNIÃO (2022); PSL (2018–2022)
- Spouse: Iara Diniz Contar
- Education: Agulhas Negras Military Academy
- Profession: military politician
- Website: Official website
- Nickname: Capitão Contar

Military service
- Allegiance: Brazil
- Branch/service: Brazilian Army
- Rank: Captain

Renan Barbosa Contar (Portuguese pronunciation: [ʁeˈnɐ̃ kõˈtaʁ]; born 25 December 1983) is a Brazilian politician and military man, having served as state deputy for Mato Grosso do Sul from 2019 to 2023, representing the state in the 11th legislature of the Legislative Assembly of Mato Grosso do Sul. Captain of the Brazilian Army, He graduated from the Agulhas Negras Military Academy in 2006, after passing through the Army Cadet Preparatory School. In his political career, he was elected in 2018 by the Social Liberal Party (PSL) and, in 2022, he joined the Brazilian Labor Renewal Party (PRTB). Influenced by figures such as Jair Bolsonaro, Capitão Contar has a strong presence in the field of conservative politics. He is married to Iara Diniz Contar and lives in Campo Grande, Mato Grosso do Sul.

He is fluent in English and Spanish.

== State deputy ==
In 2018, Contar ran in his first election and was the most voted state deputy of Mato Grosso do Sul. In the Legislative Assembly of Mato Grosso do Sul, he guided his actions by defending themes such as: the fight against corruption, tax cuts and a safer state.

== Private life ==
Son of René Roberto Contar and Miriam Machado Barbosa Contar, both of them advised him to choose the city of Campo Grande to live after training at the Military Academy of Agulhas Negras (AMAN), in order to continue the work related to his family roots. A work started by his paternal grandfather, Mr. Arif Contar, a Lebanese that came to Brazil at the beginning of the last century. After settling in the capital, the family became one of the pioneers in the region's development. Contar is married to Iara Diniz.

He has always had a passion for sports and motorcycling, having traveled through 18 countries in the Americas on his motorbike. In one of these adventures, he reaches the borders of America, such as Ushuaia (Argentina) and Alaska (United States).

== Candidate for the government of Mato Grosso do Sul ==
Captain Contar was a candidate for the government of Mato Grosso do Sul by the Brazilian Labor Renewal Party, and the lawyer, university professor, businessman and rancher Humberto Sávio Abussafi Figueiró was his running mate.

Contar was polling in the voting intentions in 3rd place, and on October 2, 2022, during the first round of the 2022 Brazilian general election, Contar got 26.71% of the vote, and was the most voted candidate for governor. He advanced to the second round against his opponent, politician Eduardo Riedel, who received 25.16% of the votes. One of the main reasons why his candidacy became so popular was that the former president Jair Bolsonaro declared his support for Contar's candidacy during a presidential debate on live TV. He was defeated by Riedel in the second round of the election, after only obtaining 43.10% of the votes.

== Electoral history ==
=== 2022 Mato Grosso do Sul gubernatorial election ===
Election	First round					Second round			
Election	Party	Votes	%	Position	Result	Votes	%	Position	Result
2022	PRTB	384,275	26.71	No. 1	Run-off	612,113	43.10	No. 2	Not Elected

=== Legislative Assembly ===
Election
Election	Party	Votes	%	Position in Mato Grosso do Sul State	Result
2018	PSL	78,390	6.11	No. 1	Elected
