= Vice Governor of Mato Grosso do Sul =

Vice Governor of the state of Mato Grosso do Sul
- Vice-governador do estado de Mato Grosso do Sul

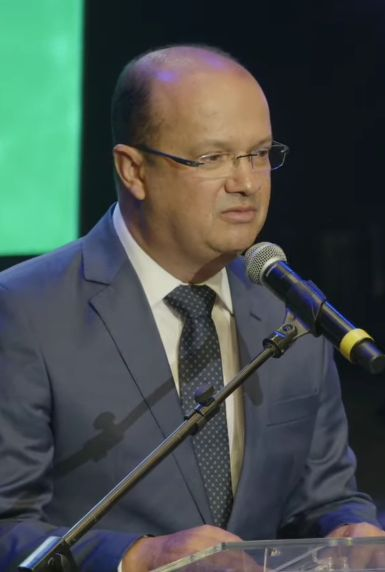
- Incumbent; José Carlos Barbosa since 1 January 2023
- Style: Mr. Vice Governor; His/Her Excellency
- Residence: He lives in his own residence
- Seat: Mato Grosso do Sul
- Appointer: Direct popular vote (two rounds if necessary)
- Term length: Four years, renewable once consecutively
- Constituting instrument: Constitution of Brazil
- Inaugural holder: Ramez Tebet
- Formation: 1982
- Deputy: Governor of Mato Grosso do Sul
- Website: www.ms.gov.br

The vice governor of Mato Grosso do Sul (Portuguese: Vice-governador do Mato Grosso do Sul) is the second-highest position in the executive branch of the government of Mato Grosso do Sul, after the governor of Mato Grosso do Sul, and ranks first in the state's governmental succession.

It has the function of replacing the governor in case of travel abroad or impediments and to succeed him in case of resignation, death or removal from office by specific process. He must also give advice to the governor, if requested.

The term of office of the vice-governor of Mato Grosso do Sul is four years with the right to run for consecutive re-election, if chosen again by the governor. Upon taking office, he takes an oath to uphold and defend the federal and state constitutions, national and state laws, the integrity of the Union and the independence of the country. The Vice Governor is automatically elected along with the Governor every four years, with no votes being cast directly for him, being elected on a slate basis. This system was implemented to prevent the lieutenant governor from being from the governor's opposition party.

Despite the state being installed in 1979 with the inauguration of Harry Amorim Costa, the position of lieutenant governor was only made official with the first state elections in Brazil after more than two decades, in 1982. With his absence, the president of the Legislative Assembly was next in line of succession.

== Living former vice governors ==
To date, seven former vice-governors are alive. In order of service are:

- George Takimoto, served from 1987 to 1991
- Braz Melo, served from 1995 to 1999
- Moacir Kohl, served from 1999 to 2003
- Egon Krakheche, served from 2003 to 2007
- Murilo Zauith, served from 2007 to 2011 and from 2019 to 2023
- Simone Tebet, served from 2011 to 2015
- Rose Modesto, served from 2015 to 2019
