= List of governors of Mato Grosso do Sul =

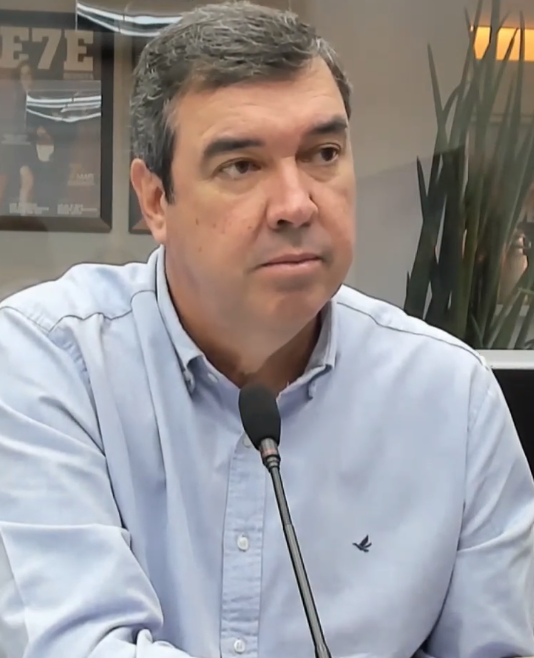
Eduardo Riedel, the current governor of Mato Grosso do Sul.

This list of governors of the state of Mato Grosso do Sul includes all the people who have held office in the history of Mato Grosso do Sul or who, having been elected, did not hold office due to death or impediment, since its official installation, on 1 January 1979

The current governor of Mato Grosso do Sul is Eduardo Riedel, elected on October 30, 2022, and sworn into office on January 1, 2023.

== Appointed governors ==
The first three governors of the Brazilian state of Mato Grosso do Sul were appointed by the president, in that time a representative of the military. For short periods, the president of the State Assembly acted as governor.

#	Name	Took office	Left office	Appointed by	Party
1	Harry Amorim Costa	January 1, 1979	June 12, 1979	Ernesto Geisel	Arena
	Londres Machado	June 13, 1979	June 30, 1979	acting governor	Arena
2	Marcelo Miranda Soares	June 28, 1979	October 29, 1980	João Figueiredo	Arena
	Londres Machado	October 29, 1980	November 7, 1980	acting governor	Arena
3	Pedro Pedrossian	October 29, 1980	March 1, 1983	João Figueiredo	PDS

== Elected governors ==
Since 1982, Mato Grosso do Sul has held direct elections for governor.

#	Name	Took office	Left office	Party	Notes	Photo
4	Wilson Barbosa Martins	March 1, 1983	March 14, 1986	PMDB	First democratically elected governor. First term. Resigned to run for another office.	
5	Ramez Tebet	March 14, 1986	March 15, 1987	PMDB	Elected as lieutenant-governor.	
6	Marcelo Miranda Soares	March 15, 1987	March 1, 1991	PMDB	Second term, had been an appointed governor.	
7	Pedro Pedrossian	March 1, 1991	December 31, 1994	PTB	Second term, had been an appointed governor.	
8	Wilson Barbosa Martins	January 1, 1995	December 31, 1998	PMDB	Second term.	
9	José Orcírio Miranda dos Santos	January 1, 1999	December 31, 2006	PT	First re-elected governor of Mato Grosso do Sul. Served for two consecutive terms.	
10	André Puccinelli	January 1, 2007	January 1, 2015	PMDB	Re-elected in 2010.	
11	Reinaldo Azambuja	January 1, 2015	Present	PSDB	Re-elected in 2018.	
12	Eduardo Riedel	January 1, 2023	Present	PSDB	Elected in 2022.	
