= André Puccinelli =

Brazilian politician

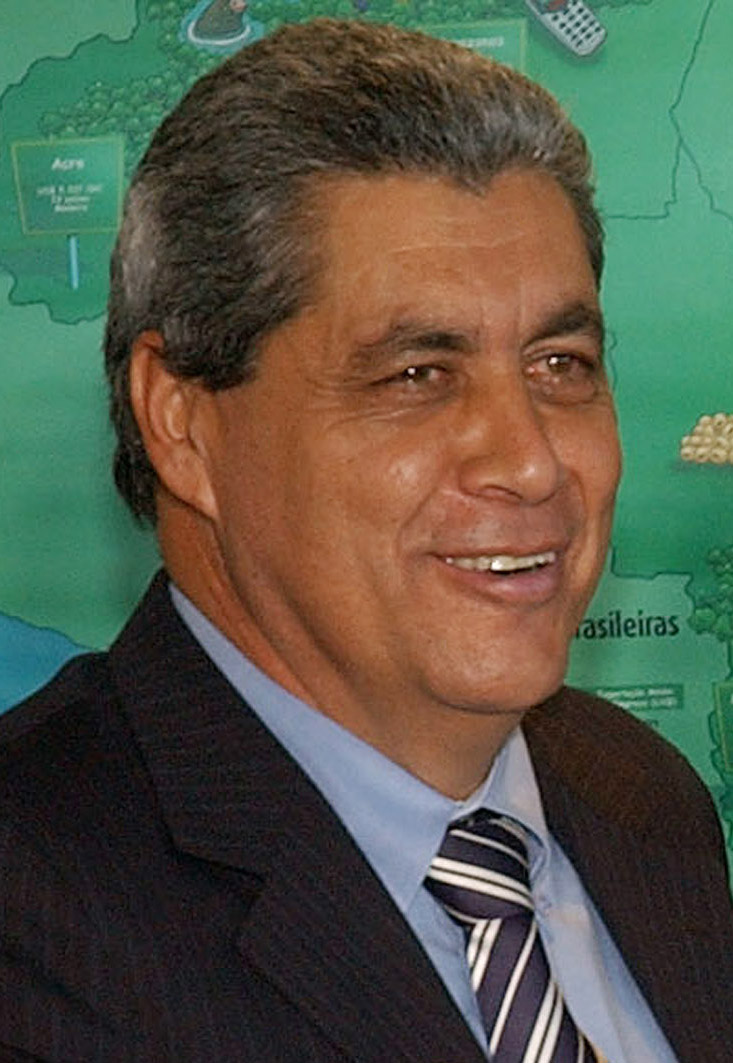

10th Governor of Mato Grosso do Sul
- In office January 1, 2007 – January 1, 2015
- Preceded by: José Orcírio Miranda dos Santos
- Succeeded by: Reinaldo Azambuja

Personal details
- Born: July 2, 1948 (age 77) Viareggio, Italy
- Party: PMDB
- Occupation: Doctor

André Puccinelli (born 2 July 1948) is an Italian-Brazilian physician and politician, affiliated with the Brazilian Democratic Movement (MDB), being the first Italian and the first foreigner to become mayor of a city in Brazilian history. He was secretary of health for the State of Mato Grosso do Sul, state deputy, federal deputy, mayor of Campo Grande for two terms and elected and re-elected governor of Mato Grosso do Sul. André Puccinelli was born in Italy and moved to Brazil still a child.

== See also ==
- List of mayors of Campo Grande (Mato Grosso do Sul)
