= State deputy =

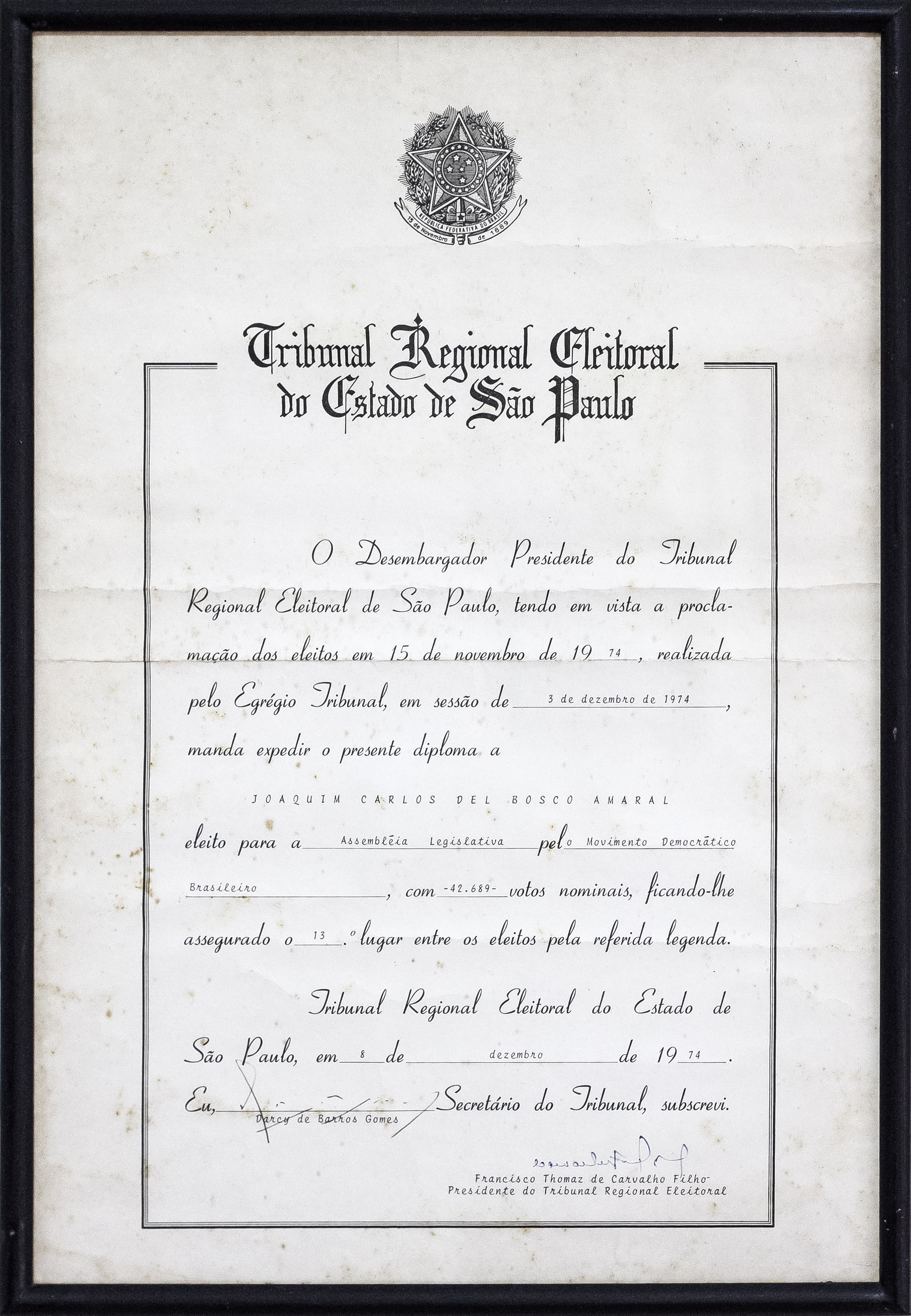
Example of Representative's Certificate to Hold Office

Established by the Constitution of Brazil, the State Senate is the State's representative body. The members are elected through the proportional system, by taking into account the joining affiliation (political party or coalition of parties), as a way to define the number of elected candidates that are filling the vacancies reserved for specific groups.

State representative, also known as state deputy (deputado estadual), is the name given to the political agent while the corresponding body is the State Legislative Assembly (Assembleia Legislativa Estadual), which is the highest legislative authority of each state.

== Mandate ==
The term for a Representative is 4 years.

The term for the President of the Legislature (elected) is a 4- or 5-year period, beginning 6 months after the start of the session.

== Function ==
The Constitution gives state legislators the task of legislating in the field of state legislative powers defined by the Constitution, including being able to propose, amend, modify, revoke and repeal state laws, both common and complementary, prepare and amend the state constitution, annually evaluating the accounts rendered by the State Governor, creating Parliamentary Committees of Inquiry, as well as other powers established in the Constitution and the State Constitution.

== Conditions of eligibility ==
1. Registered voter
2. Registered resident of elected district
3. Full political rights
4. Member of a political party
5. At least 21 years old

Illiterate individuals are not allowed to hold office.
