= Reinaldo Azambuja =

Brazilian politician (born 1963)

Senator-elect for Mato Grosso do Sul
- Assuming office 1 February 2027

Governor of Mato Grosso do Sul
- In office 1 January 2015 – 31 December 2022
- Vice Governor: Rose Modesto (2015–2019); Murilo Zauith (2019–2023)
- Preceded by: André Puccinelli
- Succeeded by: Eduardo Riedel

Member of the Chamber of Deputies
- In office 1 February 2011 – 29 December 2014
- Constituency: Mato Grosso do Sul

Member of the Legislative Assembly of Mato Grosso do Sul
- In office 1 February 2007 – 1 February 2011
- Constituency: At-large

Mayor of Maracaju
- In office 1 January 1997 – 1 January 2005
- Preceded by: Rogério Lopes Posser
- Succeeded by: Maurilio Azambuja

Personal details
- Born: May 13, 1963 (age 63) Campo Grande, Mato Grosso do Sul, Brazil
- Party: PL (2025–present)
- Other political affiliations: PSDB (1995–2025)
- Spouse: Fátima Azambuja
- Children: 2
- Education: Dom Bosco Catholic University
- Occupation: Businessperson

Reinaldo Azambuja Silva (born May 13, 1963) is a Brazilian politician and businessman who served as the 11th Governor of Mato Grosso do Sul from 2015 to 2022. In elections in Mato Grosso do Sul in 2014 he ran for governor, came in second place in the first round and won the election in the second round against the candidate Delcídio Amaral.

Born in Campo Grande, son of Zulmira Azambuja Silva and Roberto de Oliveira Silva, now deceased, Reinaldo Azambuja began studying Business Administration at the Dom Bosco Catholic University, in his hometown, but dropped out in the same year, in 1982, surprised by the death of from his father and driven to take over the family's farming business. He moved to Maracaju, in the interior of the state, after turning 18, and married Fátima Silva a year after his father's death. Reinaldo has three children: Thiago, Rafael and Rodrigo.

== Political trajectory ==
Member of the PSDB, he was elected mayor of Maracaju in 1996, competing with Germano Francisco Bellan (PDT) and Luiz Gonzaga Prata Braga (PTB). Reinaldo was elected for his first term in Maracaju with 44.03% of the valid votes. Reinaldo was also re-elected in 2000 with 61.61% of the electorate, against Albert Cruz Kuendig (PT), and succeeded in 2005 by his cousin, Maurílio Azambuja (PFL). In addition, during this period he also chaired the Association of Municipalities of Mato Grosso do Sul (Assomasul).

In 2006, he was elected state deputy and obtained the highest number of votes in the history of Mato Grosso do Sul, reaching around 47,772 votes. In the 2010 disputes, he was elected federal deputy for the Amor, Trabalho e Fé coalition, with about 122,213 valid votes.

He ran for Mayor of Campo Grande in 2012, obtaining 113,629 votes in the first round, equivalent to 25.43% of the valid votes, but lost the race for the second round, which took place between candidates Giroto, from the PMDB, and Alcides Bernal, from the PP, the latter having emerged as the winner in the race for the position.

== First government (2015–2019) ==
In the elections of Mato Grosso do Sul in 2014, he ran for the position of governor on the ticket with the councilor of Campo Grande, Rose Modesto (PSDB). Running with the former mayor of Campo Grande, Nelson Trad Filho (PMDB) and the then PT senator, Delcídio Amaral. Azambuja ended the first round in second place, reversing the placement and being elected governor in the second round with 55.34% of the votes against candidate Delcídio Amaral.

In the first year of administration, Azambuja had fulfilled six of the 23 campaign promises, in addition to having started to fulfill another two throughout 2015. In 2016, the number changed to five promises fulfilled and three were partially executed, while another fifteen of the promises given by the governor were not carried out. In the third year of his term, the governor had already fulfilled nine promises and was still carrying out three others, while 11 had not yet been put into practice. In July 2018, Reinaldo had already fulfilled 12 of the 23 campaign promises, part of the four commitments and had not yet put into practice another seven projects.

In September 2016, the Azambuja government received 50% approval, according to the IBOPE Intelligence poll. Another survey by the institute, commissioned by TV Morena, pointed out that the Chief Executive had 37% regular evaluation, 36% good, 12% excellent, 7% terrible and 4% bad. In April 2017, Azambuja received 70.97% of popular approval, adding the ratings "Great", "Good" and "Fair". The data were collected by the Research Institute of Mato Grosso do Sul (Ipems) and published by the newspaper Correio do Estado.

In November 2017, he proposed a state pension reform, having 15 votes in favor and four votes against in the first ballot. Consequently, the PT bench in the Legislative Assembly went to court to suspend the processing of the proposal, but the injunction was denied. The following week, unionists packed the House, even occupying the plenary to prevent the final vote. The session was suspended and the project had to be rescheduled. To secure approval, the Assembly beefed up security with support from the Military Police 's Shock Battalion. Access was limited, causing confrontation between the military and demonstrators, in addition to the arrest of a server suspected of destroying one of the entrance doors. By 13 votes to 7, the reform was approved in a second discussion, with the presence of police officers in plenary to ensure order, and sanctioned the following month. Azambuja then declared not to be concerned about the impact of the measures on the election and which opponents would support his measures in the future.

In August 2018, the Azambuja government received a regular evaluation of 38%, 37% considered it excellent or good, 23% thought it would be bad or terrible and 3% did not know how to answer. Hired by TV Morena, the survey was carried out by IBOPE Intelligence. Another survey, by the Real Time Big Data institute, pointed out that the toucan's administration had 53% approval, against 32% rejection. 15% of respondents did not know or had no opinion. In September, the governor's management received 46% of excellent or good evaluation, 32% of respondents considered it fair, 17% thought it was bad or terrible and 5% did not know how to give an opinion. In the month of October, the administration of Azambuja received 55% positive approval; 31% did not like the toucan's way of governing the state and 14% did not know how to give an opinion. At the end of his first term, the governor had fulfilled 13 campaign promises, seven of which had been partially implemented and another seven broken.

== Second government (2019–2023) ==
In the 2018 state elections, Azambuja ran for re-election as state governor. As deputy, the former mayor of Dourados and former vice-governor Murilo Zauith (DEM) was appointed. Among the contestants were former mayor of Mundo Novo, Humberto Amaducci (PT), former president of the Legislative Assembly of Mato Grosso do Sul, Junior Mochi, and federal judge Odilon de Oliveira (PDT). Against the latter, Azambuja qualified for the second round, winning with 52.35% of the votes.

Political offices
Preceded by Rogério Lopes Posser	Mayor of Maracaju; 1997–2005	Succeeded by Maurilio Azambuja
Preceded by André Puccinelli	Governor of Mato Grosso do Sul; 2015–2023	Succeeded by Eduardo Riedel
