= Governor of Mato Grosso do Sul =

Governor of from the state of Mato Grosso do Sul
- Governador do estado de Mato Grosso do Sul

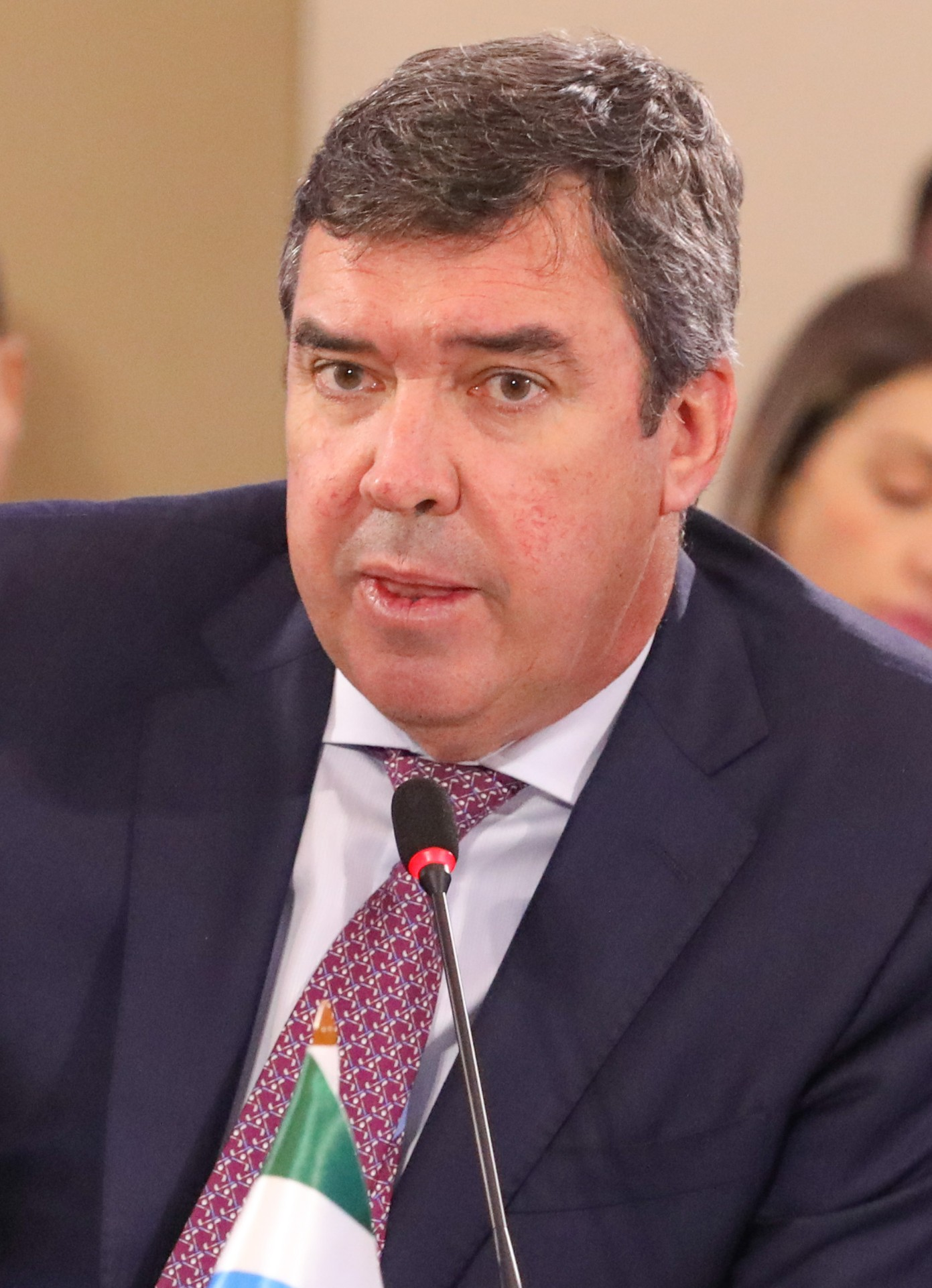
- Incumbent; Eduardo Riedel since 1 January 2023
- Style: Mr. Governor; His/Her Excellency
- Status: Head of Government
- Residence: He lives in his own residence Governorate of Mato Grosso do Sul (workplace)
- Seat: Mato Grosso do Sul
- Appointer: Direct popular vote (two rounds if necessary)
- Term length: Four years, renewable once consecutively
- Constituting instrument: Constitution of Brazil
- Inaugural holder: Harry Amorim Costa
- Formation: 1 January 1979
- Deputy: Deputy Governor of Mato Grosso do Sul
- Website: www.ms.gov.br

The governor of Mato Grosso do Sul (Portuguese: Governador do Mato Grosso do Sul) is the head of government of the Brazilian state of Mato Grosso do Sul. The governor directs the executive branch and is the commander-in-chief of the armed forms of the state.

It is a public position chosen through the two-round majority electoral system. If a candidate receives more than 50% of the total votes in the first ballot, he is elected without the need for a second round. But if no candidate obtains an absolute majority, a second round of voting would take place, where only the two candidates who obtained the most votes in the first round would participate. The winner of the second round would be elected governor. The legislature lasts 4 years and the governor has the right to re-election, without term limits.

The state was created by Complementary Law No. 31, sanctioned on October 11, 1977. The current governor of Mato Grosso do Sul is Eduardo Riedel, elected on October 30, 2014 and sworn into office on January 1, 2023.

The colors indicate how each governor was elected, with directly elected governors, governors who came to government through the line of succession (for example, when a vice governor assumes the position of governor, or when a president of the Legislative Assembly assumes the government if there is no lieutenant governor), and governors elected by indirect suffrage or sworn in through revolutionary movements, including those who took over as legal substitutes not directly elected.

== Government ==
The seat of the government (Governadoria) is located in Parque dos Poderes, in the Sulmatogrossense capital, Campo Grande. The building is also occupied by the headquarters of the Secretary of State for Government and Strategic Management and the Undersecretariat of Communication.

Designed by the architect Élvio Garabini, who also designed a large part of the Park's buildings, the construction was inaugurated in 1983, with the entire complex of public organs.

When the complex was opened, the Government was temporarily located in this building, which was supposed to accommodate only one secretariat. The construction of a government palace had been projected, but the idea was aborted by the governor Pedro Pedrossian. Thus, the Governorate was definitively fixed in the same seat where it was and which it occupies to this day. In the decade of 2000, the option of executing the construction of the palace was evaluated, but the idea was again discarded.

The governor has no official residence.
