= 2022 Santa Catarina gubernatorial election =

Gubernatorial election held in Brazil

2022 Santa Catarina state election
- 2 October 2022 (first round); 30 October 2022 (second round)
- Opinion polls
- Turnout: 81.54% (first round); 82.56% (second round)
- Gubernatorial election
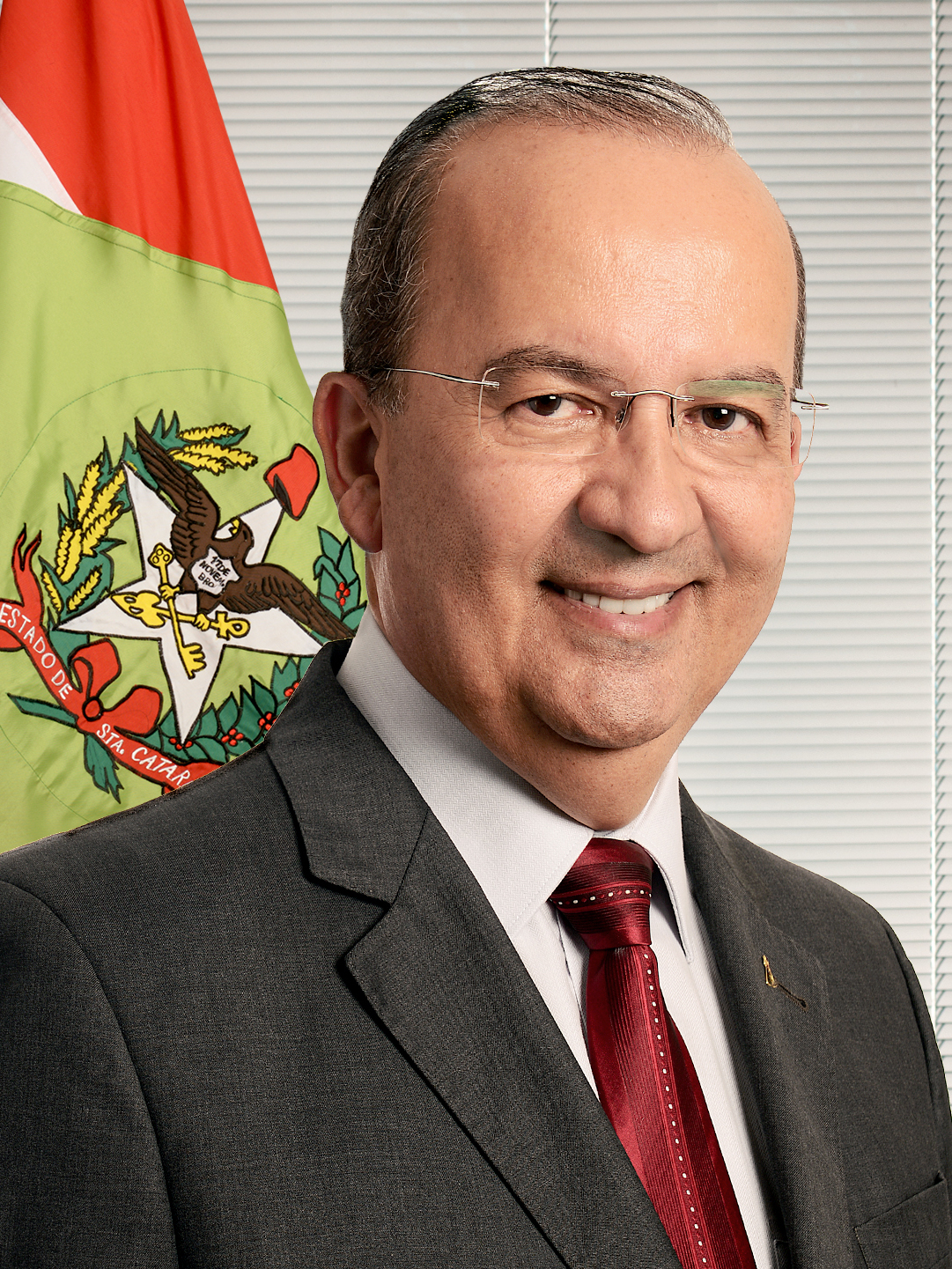

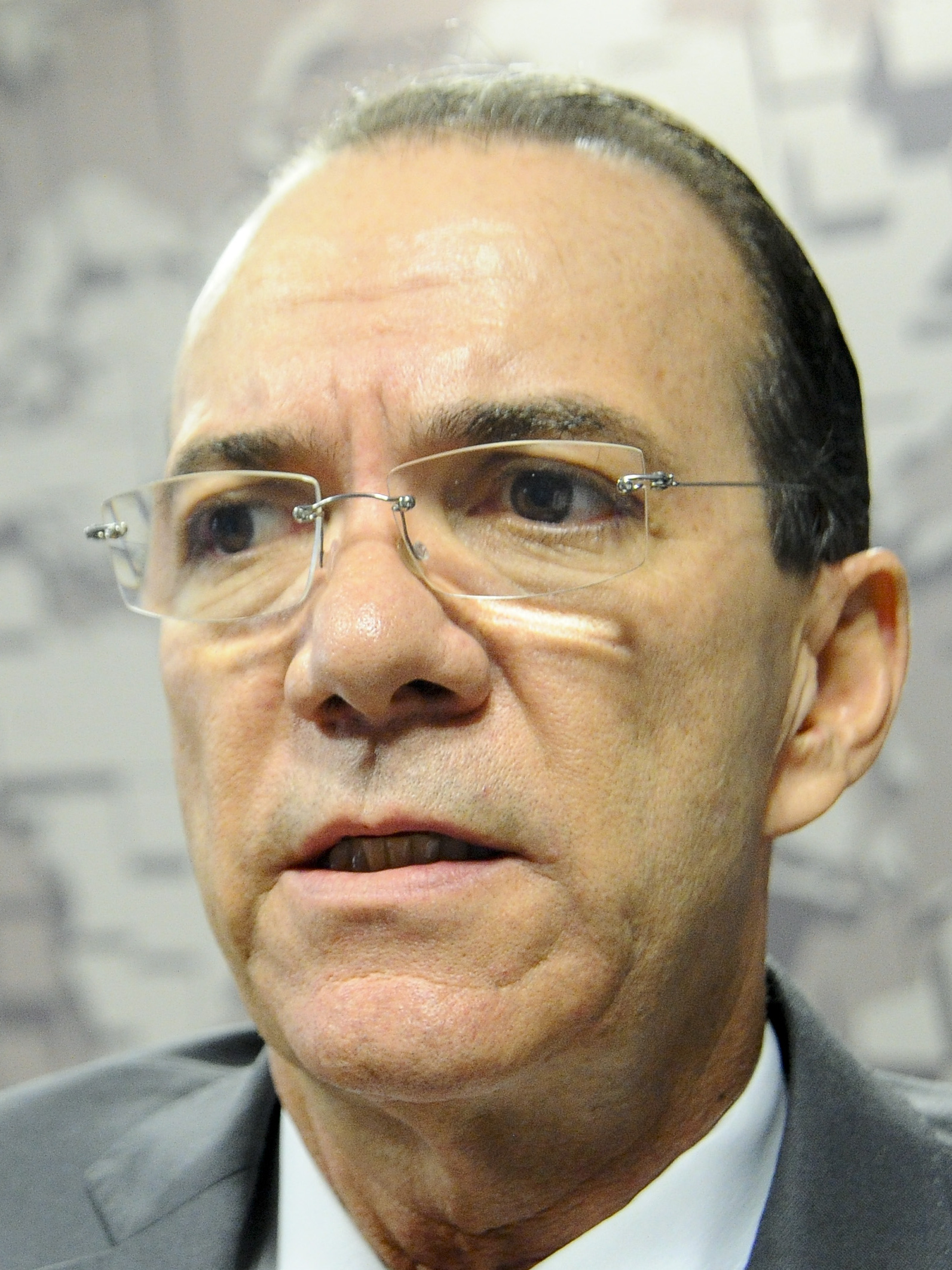
| Candidate | Jorginho Mello | Décio Lima |
| Party | PL | PT |
| Alliance | None | Democratic Front of Santa Catarina |
| Running mate | Marilisa Boehm | Bia Vargas |
| Popular vote | 2,983,949 | 1,237,016 |
| Percentage | 70.69% | 29.31% |
- Candidate with the most votes per municipality in the 2nd round (295): Jorginho Mello (280 municipalities); Décio Lima (15 municipalities)
Governor before election
Carlos Moisés
Republicanos
Elected Governor
Jorginho Mello
PL
- Parliamentary election
- All 40 seats of the Legislative Assembly
| Party | Leader | Vote % | Seats | +/– |
Legislative Assembly
| PL | Ana Caroline Campagnolo | 21.81 | 11 | +8 |
| MDB | Antídio Lunelli | 12.55 | 6 | −3 |
| PT | Luciane Carminatti | 10.87 | 4 | 0 |
| PSD | Mário Motta | 7.29 | 3 | −2 |
| PP | Zé Milton | 6.96 | 3 | 0 |
| UNIÃO | Jair Miotto | 6.60 | 3 | +3 |
| PODE | Paulinha | 5.89 | 3 | +3 |
| PSDB | Marcos Vieira | 5.24 | 2 | 0 |
| Republicanos | Sérgio Motta | 4.06 | 1 | 0 |
| NOVO | Matheus Cadorin | 3.39 | 1 | 0 |
| PTB | Delegado Egídio Ferrari | 2.40 | 1 | 0 |
| PSOL | Marquito | 2.06 | 1 | +1 |
| PDT | Rodrigo Minotto | 2.04 | 1 | −1 |
This lists parties that won seats. See the complete results below.
- Senatorial election
- 2 October 2022 (one-only round)
- Opinion polls
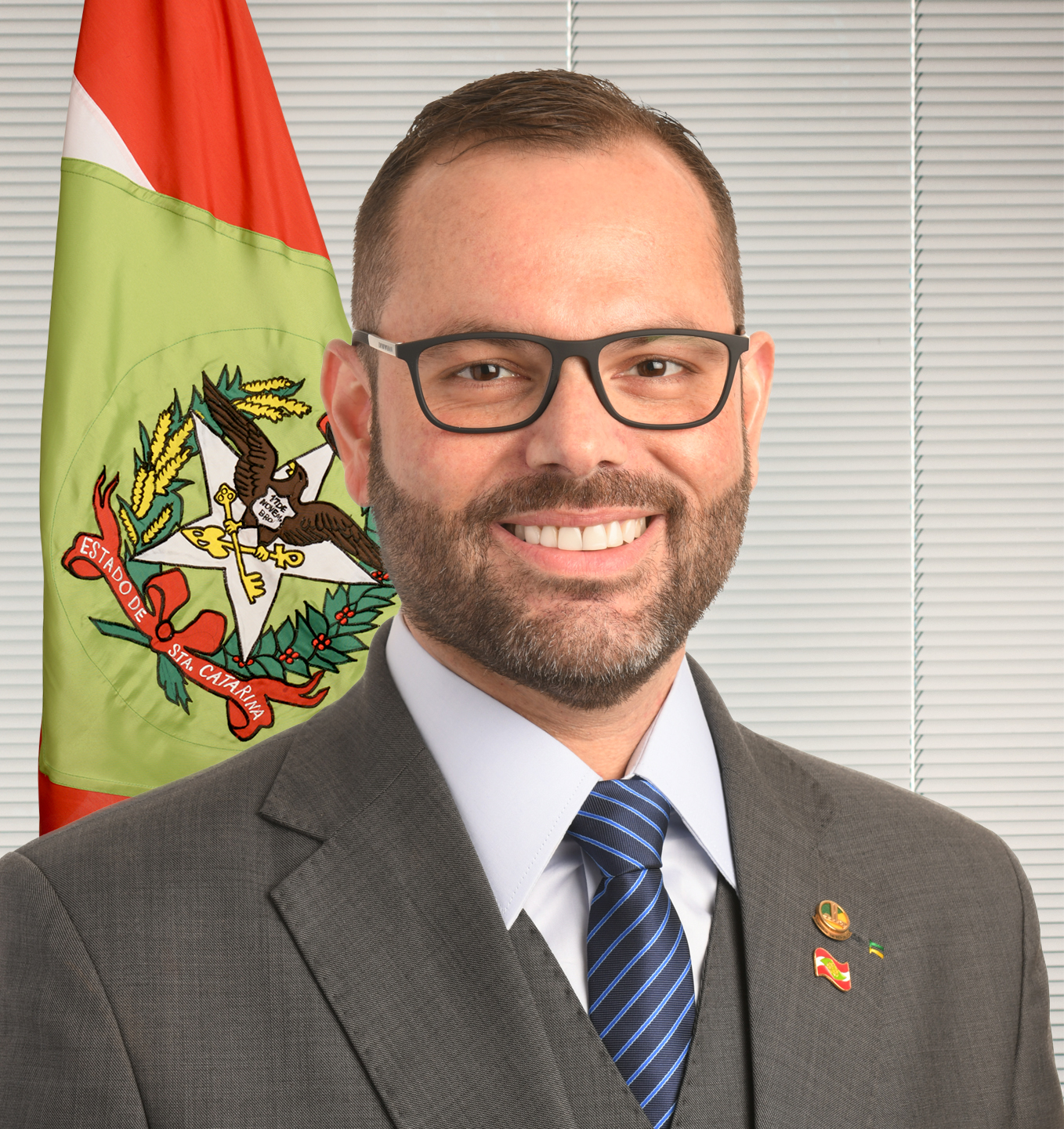

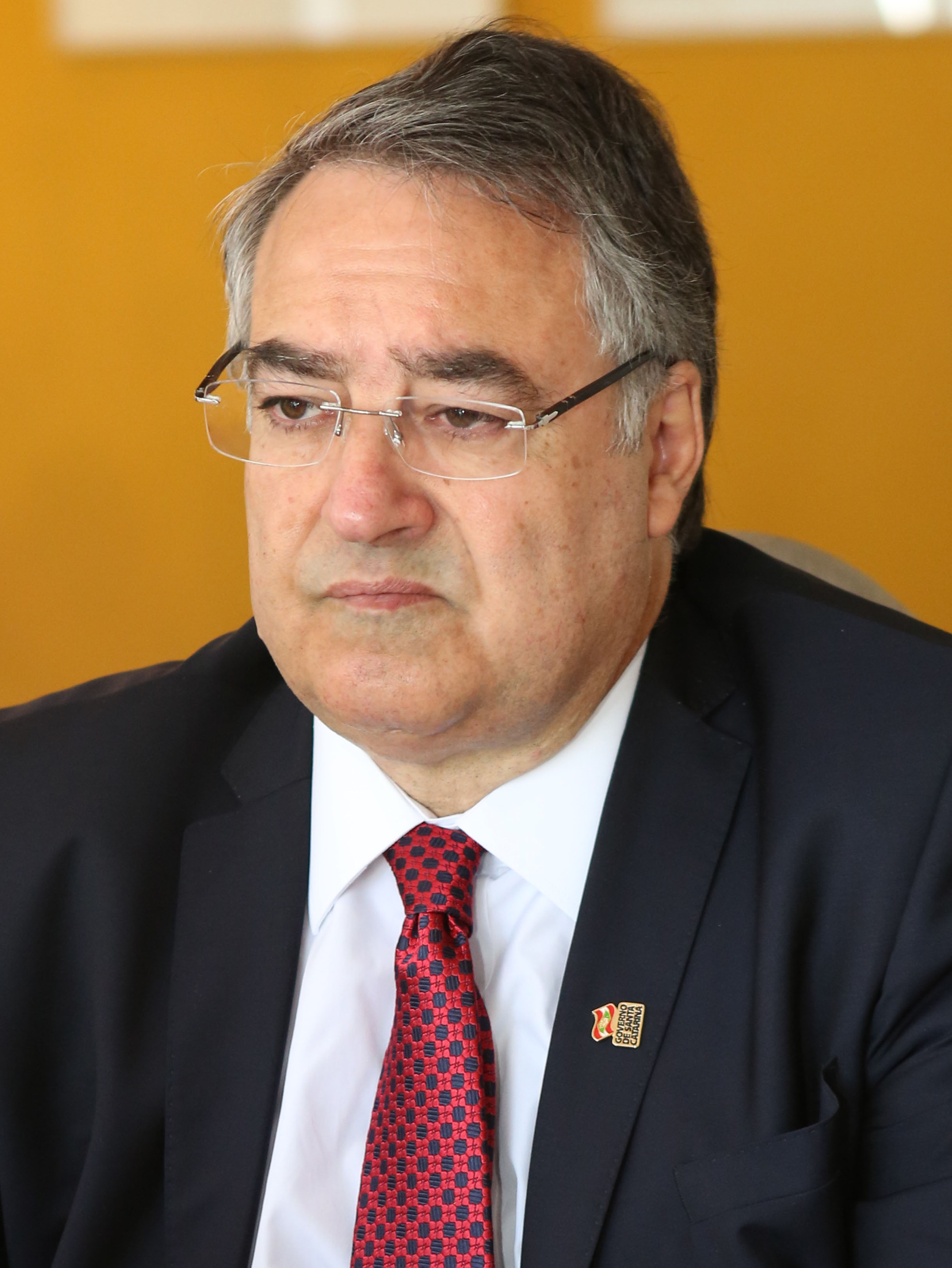

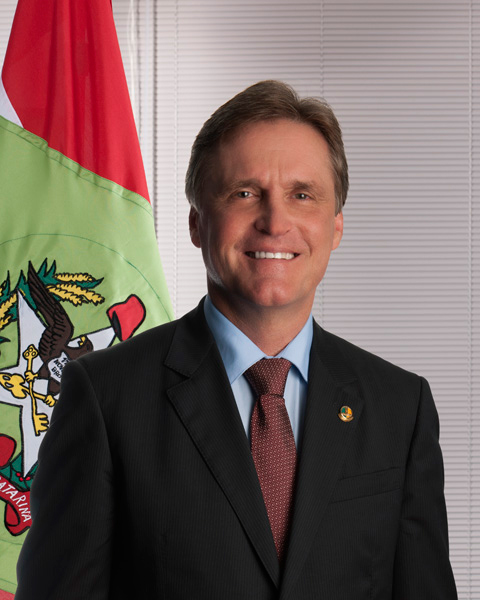
| Candidate | Jorge Seif | Raimundo Colombo | Dário |
| Party | PL | PSD | PSB |
| Alliance | None | Let's Work | Democratic Front of Santa Catarina |
| Popular vote | 1,484,110 | 608,213 | 605.258 |
| Percentage | 39.79% | 16.30% | 16.23% |
- Candidate with the most votes per municipality (645): Jorge Seif (203 municipalities); Dário Berger (45 municipalities); Celso Maldaner (30 municipalities); Raimundo Colombo (10 municipalities); Kennedy Nunes (5 municipalities); Tied
Senator before election
Dário Berger
PSB
Elected Senator
Jorge Seif
PL

The 2022 Santa Catarina state election took place in the state of Santa Catarina, Brazil on 2 October 2022 and 30 October 2022. Voters elected a Governor, Vice Governor, one Senator, 16 representatives for the Chamber of Deputies and 40 Legislative Assembly members. The incumbent Governor, Carlos Moisés, of the Republicans, was eligible for a second term and ran for reelection.

Moisés was elected Governor in 2018 and took office as the governor on January 1, 2019. Moisés was impeached twice by the Legislative Assembly of Santa Catarina but was acquitted in both requests by the Special Impeachment Court. Moisés was elected as a member of the PSL but joined the Republicans for the 2022 election. Senator Jorginho Mello (PL) was elected governor in the second round with the greatest percentage of votes of the whole election cycle.

For the election to the Federal Senate, the seat occupied by Dário Berger (PSB) since 2014, was at dispute, and the incumbent said that he will run for reelection. Bolsonaro fisheries official Jorge Seif (PL) was elected senator by a 20 point margin.

== Electoral calendar ==
Note: This section only presents the main dates of the 2022 electoral calendar, check the TSE official website (in Portuguese) and other official sources for detailed information.

Electoral calendar
| May 15 | Start of crowdfunding of candidates |
| July 20 to August 5 | Party conventions for choosing candidates and coalitions |
| August 16 to September 30 | Period of exhibition of free electoral propaganda on radio, television and on the internet related to the first round |
| October 2 | First round of 2022 elections |
| October 7 to October 28 | Period of exhibition of free electoral propaganda on radio, television and on the internet related to the second round |
| October 30 | Second round of 2022 elections |
| until December 19 | Delivery of electoral diplomas for those who were elected in the 2022 elections by the Brazilian Election Justice |

== Legislative Assembly ==
The result of the last state election and the current situation in the Legislative Assembly of São Paulo is given below:

| Affiliation | Members | | +/– |
| Affiliation | Elected | Current | +/– |
|---|---|---|---|
| PL | 6 | 19 | ▲13 |
| PSDB | 8 | 13 | ▲5 |
| PT | 10 | 10 | Steady |
| UNIÃO | New | 8 | ▲8 |
| PODE | 4 | 7 | ▲3 |
| Republicanos | 6 | 7 | ▲1 |
| PP | 4 | 5 | ▲1 |
| MDB | 3 | 3 | Steady |
| PSD | 2 | 3 | ▲1 |
| PSOL | 4 | 3 | ▼1 |
| Cidadania | 2 | 2 | Steady |
| Avante | 1 | 2 | ▲1 |
| PCdoB | 1 | 2 | ▲1 |
| PDT | 1 | 2 | ▲1 |
| NOVO | 4 | 2 | ▼2 |
| Agir | 0 | 1 | ▲1 |
| PRTB | 0 | 1 | ▲1 |
| Patriota | 1 | 1 | Steady |
| REDE | 1 | 1 | Steady |
| Solidarity | 1 | 1 | Steady |
| PSB | 8 | 1 | ▼7 |
| PHS | 1 | 0 | ▼1 |
| PROS | 1 | 0 | ▼1 |
| PV | 1 | 0 | ▼1 |
| PTB | 2 | 0 | ▼2 |
| DEM | 7 | 0 | ▼7 |
| PSL | 15 | 0 | ▼15 |
| Total | 94 | | – |

== Gubernatorial candidates ==
The party conventions began on July 20 and will continue until August 5th. The following political parties have already confirmed their candidacies. Political parties have until August 15, 2022, to formally register their candidates.

=== Candidates in runoff ===
| Party | Candidate | Most relevant political office or occupation | Party | Running mate | Coalition | Electoral number | TV time per party/coalition | Refs. |
|---|---|---|---|---|---|---|---|---|
| PL | Jorginho Mello | Senator for Santa Catarina (2019–2023) | PL | Marilisa Boehm | —N/a | 22 | 43 seconds | |
| Workers' Party (PT) | Décio Lima | Federal deputy of Santa Catarina (2007–2019) | Brazilian Socialist Party (PSB) | Bia Vargas | Democratic Front of Santa Catarina: Brazil of Hope; Workers' Party (PT); Communist Party of Brazil (PCdoB); Green Party (PV); Brazilian Socialist Party (PSB); Solidariedade | 13 | 2 minutes and 12 seconds | |

=== Candidates failing to make runoff ===
| Party | Candidate | Most relevant political office or occupation | Party | Running mate | Coalition | Electoral number | TV time per party/coalition | Refs. |
|---|---|---|---|---|---|---|---|---|
| Republicans | Carlos Moisés | Governor of Santa Catarina (2019–2023) | Brazilian Democratic Movement (MDB) | Udo Döhler | Santa Catarina in First Place: Republicans; Brazilian Democratic Movement (MDB); Podemos (PODE); Avante; Social Christian Party (PSC); Christian Democracy (DC) | 10 | 1 minute and 49 seconds | |
| Brazil Union (UNIÃO) | Gean Loureiro | Mayor of Florianópolis (2017–2022) | Social Democratic Party (PSD) | Eron Giordani | Let's Work: Brazil Union (UNIÃO); Social Democratic Party (PSD); Patriota | 44 | 2 minutes and 23 seconds | |
| Progressistas (PP) | Esperidião Amin | Senator for Santa Catarina (1991-1999, since 2019) | Brazilian Social Democracy Party (PSDB) | Dalirio Beber | Experience to Serve Santa Catarina: Progressistas (PP); Always Forward; Brazilian Social Democracy Party (PSDB); Cidadania; Brazilian Labour Party (PTB) | 11 | 1 minute and 40 seconds | |
| New Party (NOVO) | Odair Tramontin | Prosecutor (since 1988) | New Party (NOVO) | Ricardo Althoff | —N/a | 30 | 16 seconds | |
| Democratic Labour Party (PDT) | Jorge Boeira | Federal Deputy for Santa Catarina (2003-2019) | Democratic Labour Party (PDT) | Adilson Buzzi | —N/a | 12 | 37 seconds | |
| United Socialist Workers' Party (PSTU) | Professor Alex Alano | State Public School Teacher | United Socialist Workers' Party (PSTU) | Gabriela Santetti | —N/a | 16 | —N/a | |
| Republican Party of the Social Order (PROS) | Ralph Zimmer | Public Defender | Republican Party of the Social Order (PROS) | Ana Lúcia Meotti | —N/a | 90 | 17 seconds | |
| Workers' Cause Party (PCO) | Leandro Brugnago | Carpenter | Workers' Cause Party (PCO) | Jair Fernandes de Aguiar Ramos | —N/a | 80 | —N/a | |
| The television time reserved for political propaganda for each election will be distributed among all parties and coalitions that have a candidate and representation in the Chamber of Deputies. | | | | | | | Total: 10 minutes | |

== Senatorial candidates ==
The party conventions began on July 20 and will continue until August 5th. The following political parties have already confirmed their candidacies. Political parties have until August 15, 2022, to formally register their candidates.

=== Confirmed candidates ===
| Party | Candidate | Most relevant political office or occupation | Party | Candidates for Alternate Senators | Coalition | Electoral number |
|---|---|---|---|---|---|---|
| Democratic Labour Party (PDT) | Hilda Deola | City Councillor of Itajaí (since 2021) | Democratic Labour Party (PDT) | 1st alternate senator: Adilson Buzzi | —N/a | 123 |
| Democratic Labour Party (PDT) | Hilda Deola | City Councillor of Itajaí (since 2021) | Democratic Labour Party (PDT) | 2nd alternate senator: Guilherme Pereira | —N/a | 123 |
| Brazilian Labour Party (PTB) | Kennedy Nunes | Member of the Legislative Assembly of Santa Catarina (2019–2023) | Brazilian Social Democracy Party (PSDB) | 1st alternate senator: Bruno Bortoluzzi | Experience to Serve Santa Catarina: Progressistas (PP); Always Forward; Brazilian Social Democracy Party (PSDB); Cidadania; Brazilian Labour Party (PTB) | 142 |
| Brazilian Labour Party (PTB) | Kennedy Nunes | Member of the Legislative Assembly of Santa Catarina (2019–2023) | Brazilian Labour Party (PTB) | 2nd alternate senator: Ruti Rossi | Experience to Serve Santa Catarina: Progressistas (PP); Always Forward; Brazilian Social Democracy Party (PSDB); Cidadania; Brazilian Labour Party (PTB) | 142 |
| Brazilian Democratic Movement (MDB) | Celso Maldaner | Member of the Chamber of Deputies (2007–2023 | Republicanos | 1st alternate senator: Nazareno Martins | Santa Catarina in First Place: Republicans; Brazilian Democratic Movement (MDB); Podemos (PODE); Avante; Social Christian Party (PSC); Christian Democracy (DC) | 155 |
| Brazilian Democratic Movement (MDB) | Celso Maldaner | Member of the Chamber of Deputies (2007–2023 | Brazilian Democratic Movement (MDB) | 2nd alternate senator: Edinho Bez | Santa Catarina in First Place: Republicans; Brazilian Democratic Movement (MDB); Podemos (PODE); Avante; Social Christian Party (PSC); Christian Democracy (DC) | 155 |
| United Socialist Workers' Party (PSTU) | Gilmar Salgado | Retired public servant | United Socialist Workers' Party (PSTU) | 1st alternate senator: Marina Soares | —N/a | 161 |
| United Socialist Workers' Party (PSTU) | Gilmar Salgado | Retired public servant | United Socialist Workers' Party (PSTU) | 2nd alternate senator: Tarcísio Eberhardt | —N/a | 161 |
| Liberal Party (PL) | Jorge Seif | National Secretary of Fishing and Aquaculture (2019–2022) | Liberal Party (PL) | 1st alternate senator: Hermes Klann | —N/a | 222 |
| Liberal Party (PL) | Jorge Seif | National Secretary of Fishing and Aquaculture (2019–2022) | Liberal Party (PL) | 2nd alternate senator: Adrian Censi | —N/a | 222 |
| New Party (NOVO) | Luiz Barboza Neto | Ophthalmologist | New Party (NOVO) | 1st alternate senator: Helon Antonio Rebelatto | —N/a | 300 |
| New Party (NOVO) | Luiz Barboza Neto | Ophthalmologist | New Party (NOVO) | 2nd alternate senator: Cariny Figueiredo | —N/a | 300 |
| Brazilian Socialist Party (PSB) | Dário Berger | Senator for Santa Catarina (2015–present) | Workers' Party (PT) | 1st alternate senator: José Fritsch | Democratic Front of Santa Catarina: Brazil of Hope; Workers' Party (PT); Communist Party of Brazil (PCdoB); Green Party (PV); Solidariedade; Brazilian Socialist Party (PSB) | 400 |
| Brazilian Socialist Party (PSB) | Dário Berger | Senator for Santa Catarina (2015–present) | Green Party (PV) | 2nd alternate senator: Guaraci Fagundes | Democratic Front of Santa Catarina: Brazil of Hope; Workers' Party (PT); Communist Party of Brazil (PCdoB); Green Party (PV); Solidariedade; Brazilian Socialist Party (PSB) | 400 |
| Socialism and Liberty Party (PSOL) | Afrânio Boppré | City Councillor of Florianópolis (since 2013) | Sustainability Network(REDE) | 1st alternate senator: Miriam Prochnow | PSOL REDE Federation | 500 |
| Socialism and Liberty Party (PSOL) | Afrânio Boppré | City Councillor of Florianópolis (since 2013) | Sustainability Network(REDE) | 2nd alternate senator: Márcia Stefani | PSOL REDE Federation | 500 |
| Social Democratic Party (PSD) | Raimundo Colombo | Governor of Santa Catarina (2011–2018) | Brazil Union (UNIÃO) | 1st alternate senator: Ivandro de Souza | Let's Work: Brazil Union (UNIÃO); Social Democratic Party (PSD); Patriota | 551 |
| Social Democratic Party (PSD) | Raimundo Colombo | Governor of Santa Catarina (2011–2018) | Patriota | 2nd alternate senator: David Fernandes | Let's Work: Brazil Union (UNIÃO); Social Democratic Party (PSD); Patriota | 551 |

== Debate list ==
For the first time in the Brazilian general elections since 1989, television and radio stations, newspapers and news websites group themselves into pools to hold gubernatorial debates, by request of the campaigns in order to reduce the number of debates scheduled for the 2022 elections.

As of 29 August 2022, the following presidential debates were held or scheduled (times in UTC−03:00):

2022 Santa Catarina gubernatorial election debates
| No. | Date, time and location | Hosts | Moderators | Participants | | | | | | | |
| Key: P Present A Absent | | | | Rep | PT | PP | UNIÃO | PDT | PL | NOVO | PROS |
| Key: P Present A Absent | | | | Moisés | Lima | Amin | Loureiro | Boeira | Mello | Tramontin | Zimmer |
|---|---|---|---|---|---|---|---|---|---|---|---|
| 1 | Saturday, 6 August 2022, 18:15, Florianópolis | SCC SBT | Cláudio Prisco Paraíso | P | P | P | P | P | P | P | A |
| 2 | Tuesday, 27 September 2022, 22:00, Florianópolis | NSC TV, CBN, G1 | Raphael Faraco | P | P | P | P | P | P | P | P |

== Results ==
=== Governor ===
| Candidate | Running mate | Party | First round | | Second round | |
| Candidate | Running mate | Party | Votes | % | Votes | % |
|---|---|---|---|---|---|---|
| Jorginho Mello | Marilisa Boehm | PL | 1,575,912 | 38.62 | 2,983,949 | 70.69 |
| Décio Lima | Beatriz Vargas (PSB) | PT | 710,859 | 17.42 | 1,237,016 | 29.31 |
| Carlos Moisés (incumbent) | Udo Dohler (MDB) | Republicanos | 693,426 | 16.99 | | |
| Gean Loureiro | Eron Giordani (PSD) | UNIÃO | 555,615 | 13.61 | | |
| Esperidião Amin | Dalírio Beber (PSDB) | PP | 398,092 | 9.75 | | |
| Odair Tramontin | Ricardo Althoff | NOVO | 114,087 | 2.80 | | |
| Jorge Boeira | Adilson Buzzi | PDT | 24,809 | 0.61 | | |
| Alex Alano | Gabriela Santetti | PSTU | 4,395 | 0.11 | | |
| Ralf Zimmer | Ana Meotti | PROS | 3,828 | 0.09 | | |
| Leandro Borges | Jair de Aguiar | PCO | 829 | | | |
| Total | | | 4,081,023 | 100.00 | 4,220,965 | 100.00 |
| Valid votes | | | 4,081,023 | 91.26 | 4,220,965 | 93.22 |
| Invalid votes | | | 167,571 | 3.75 | 141,361 | 3.12 |
| Blank votes | | | 223,025 | 4.99 | 165,455 | 3.65 |
| Total votes | | | 4,471,619 | 100.00 | 4,527,781 | 100.00 |
| Registered voters/turnout | | | 5,486,962 | 81.50 | 5,486,962 | 82.52 |
| PL gain from Republicanos | | | | | | |

Popular vote (first round)
| Mello | 38.61% |
| Lima | 17.42% |
| Moisés | 16.99% |
| Loureiro | 13.61% |
| Amin | 9.75% |
| Others | 3.60% |

Popular vote (second round)
| Mello | 70.69% |
| Lima | 29.31% |

=== Senator ===
| Candidate | Party | Votes | % |
|---|---|---|---|
| Jorge Seif | PL | 1,484,110 | 39.79 |
| Raimundo Colombo | PSD | 608,213 | 16.30 |
| Dário Berger (incumbent) | PSB | 605,258 | 16.23 |
| Kennedy Nunes | PTB | 443,425 | 11.89 |
| Celso Maldaner | MDB | 304,799 | 8.17 |
| Afrânio Boppré | PSOL | 116,189 | 3.11 |
| Luiz Barboza | NOVO | 99,107 | 2.66 |
| Hilda Deola | PDT | 66,496 | 1.78 |
| Gilmar Salgado | PSTU | 2,657 | 0.07 |
| Total | | 3,730,254 | 100.00 |
| Valid votes | | 3,730,254 | 83.42 |
| Invalid votes | | 361,227 | 8.08 |
| Blank votes | | 380,138 | 8.50 |
| Total votes | | 4,471,619 | 100.00 |
| Registered voters/turnout | | 5,486,962 | 81.50 |
| PL gain from PSB | | | |

Popular vote
| Seif | 39.79% |
| Colombo | 16.30% |
| Berger | 16.23% |
| Nunes | 11.89% |
| Maldaner | 8.17% |
| Others | 7.62% |

=== Chamber of Deputies ===
| Party or alliance | | Votes | % | Seats | +/– |
|---|---|---|---|---|---|
| Liberal Party | | 962,053 | 24.23 | 6 | ▲6 |
| Brazil of Hope | Workers' Party | 480,911 | 12.11 | 2 | Steady |
| Brazil of Hope | Communist Party of Brazil | 39,868 | 1.00 | 0 | Steady |
| Brazil of Hope | Green Party | 3,654 | 0.09 | 0 | Steady |
| Brazilian Democratic Movement | | 415,237 | 10.46 | 3 | Steady |
| Social Democratic Party | | 391,429 | 9.86 | 2 | ▲1 |
| Brazil Union | | 279,432 | 7.04 | 1 | New |
| New Party | | 243,668 | 6.14 | 1 | Steady |
| Progressistas | | 209,318 | 5.27 | 0 | ▼1 |
| Podemos | | 185,454 | 4.67 | 0 | Steady |
| Always Forward | Brazilian Social Democracy Party | 138,407 | 3.49 | 0 | ▼1 |
| Always Forward | Cidadania | 135,368 | 3.41 | 1 | Steady |
| Republicanos | | 120,494 | 3.04 | 0 | ▼1 |
| Patriota | | 71,669 | 1.81 | 0 | Steady |
| Brazilian Socialist Party | | 63,485 | 1.60 | 0 | ▲1 |
| Brazilian Labour Party | | 62,709 | 1.58 | 0 | Steady |
| PSOL REDE | Socialism and Liberty Party | 60,893 | 1.53 | 0 | Steady |
| PSOL REDE | Sustainability Network | 1,927 | 0.05 | 0 | Steady |
| Social Christian Party | | 35,820 | 0.90 | 0 | Steady |
| Democratic Labour Party | | 31,296 | 0.79 | 0 | Steady |
| Avante | | 12,509 | 0.32 | 0 | Steady |
| Solidariedade | | 10,955 | 0.28 | 0 | Steady |
| Republican Party of the Social Order | | 4,679 | 0.12 | 0 | Steady |
| Popular Unity | | 3,548 | 0.09 | 0 | New |
| Brazilian Labour Renewal Party | | 2,503 | 0.06 | 0 | Steady |
| Christian Democracy | | 1,490 | 0.04 | 0 | Steady |
| United Socialist Workers' Party | | 1,072 | 0.03 | 0 | Steady |
| Workers' Cause Party | | 0 | 0.00 | 0 | Steady |
| Total | | 3,969,848 | 100.00 | 16 | – |
| Valid votes | | 3,969,848 | 88.78 | | |
| Invalid votes | | 180,335 | 4.03 | | |
| Blank votes | | 321,436 | 7.19 | | |
| Total votes | | 4,471,619 | 100.00 | | |
| Registered voters/turnout | | 5,486,962 | 81.50 | | |

=== Legislative Assembly ===
| Party or alliance | | Votes | % | Seats | +/– |
|---|---|---|---|---|---|
| Liberal Party | | 878,708 | 21.95 | 11 | ▲8 |
| Brazilian Democratic Movement | | 505,571 | 12.63 | 6 | ▼3 |
| Brazil of Hope | Workers' Party | 438,030 | 10.94 | 4 | Steady |
| Brazil of Hope | Communist Party of Brazil | 17,985 | 0.45 | 0 | Steady |
| Brazil of Hope | Green Party | 590 | 0.01 | 0 | ▼1 |
| Social Democratic Party | | 293,675 | 7.33 | 3 | ▼2 |
| Progressistas | | 280,551 | 7.01 | 3 | Steady |
| Brazil Union | | 265,764 | 6.64 | 3 | New |
| Podemos | | 237,137 | 5.92 | 3 | ▲3 |
| Always Forward | Brazilian Social Democracy Party | 211,208 | 5.27 | 2 | Steady |
| Always Forward | Cidadania | 25,109 | 0.63 | 0 | Steady |
| Republicanos | | 163,410 | 4.08 | 1 | Steady |
| New Party | | 136,632 | 3.41 | 1 | ▲1 |
| Brazilian Labour Party | | 96,767 | 2.42 | 1 | ▲1 |
| Brazilian Socialist Party | | 92,851 | 2.32 | 0 | ▼3 |
| Patriota | | 88,159 | 2.20 | 0 | Steady |
| PSOL REDE | Socialism and Liberty Party | 83,044 | 2.07 | 1 | ▲1 |
| PSOL REDE | Sustainability Network | 1,501 | 0.04 | 0 | Steady |
| Democratic Labour Party | | 82,141 | 2.05 | 1 | ▼1 |
| Christian Democracy | | 30,781 | 0.77 | 0 | Steady |
| Solidariedade | | 30,557 | 0.76 | 0 | Steady |
| Social Christian Party | | 30,036 | 0.75 | 0 | ▼1 |
| Avante | | 8,610 | 0.22 | 0 | Steady |
| Brazilian Labour Renewal Party | | 3,126 | 0.08 | 0 | Steady |
| United Socialist Workers' Party | | 1,083 | 0.03 | 0 | Steady |
| Republican Party of the Social Order | | 1,010 | 0.03 | 0 | Steady |
| Workers' Cause Party | | 0 | 0.00 | 0 | Steady |
| Total | | 4,004,036 | 100.00 | 40 | – |
| Valid votes | | 4,004,036 | 89.54 | | |
| Invalid votes | | 178,518 | 3.99 | | |
| Blank votes | | 289,065 | 6.46 | | |
| Total votes | | 4,471,619 | 100.00 | | |
| Registered voters/turnout | | 5,486,962 | 81.50 | | |
