= 2018 Santa Catarina gubernatorial election =

Gubernatorial election held in Brazil

2018 Santa Catarina state election
- 7 October 2018 (first round); 28 October 2018 (second round)
- Turnout: 83.69% (first round); 83.13% (second round)
- Gubernatorial election
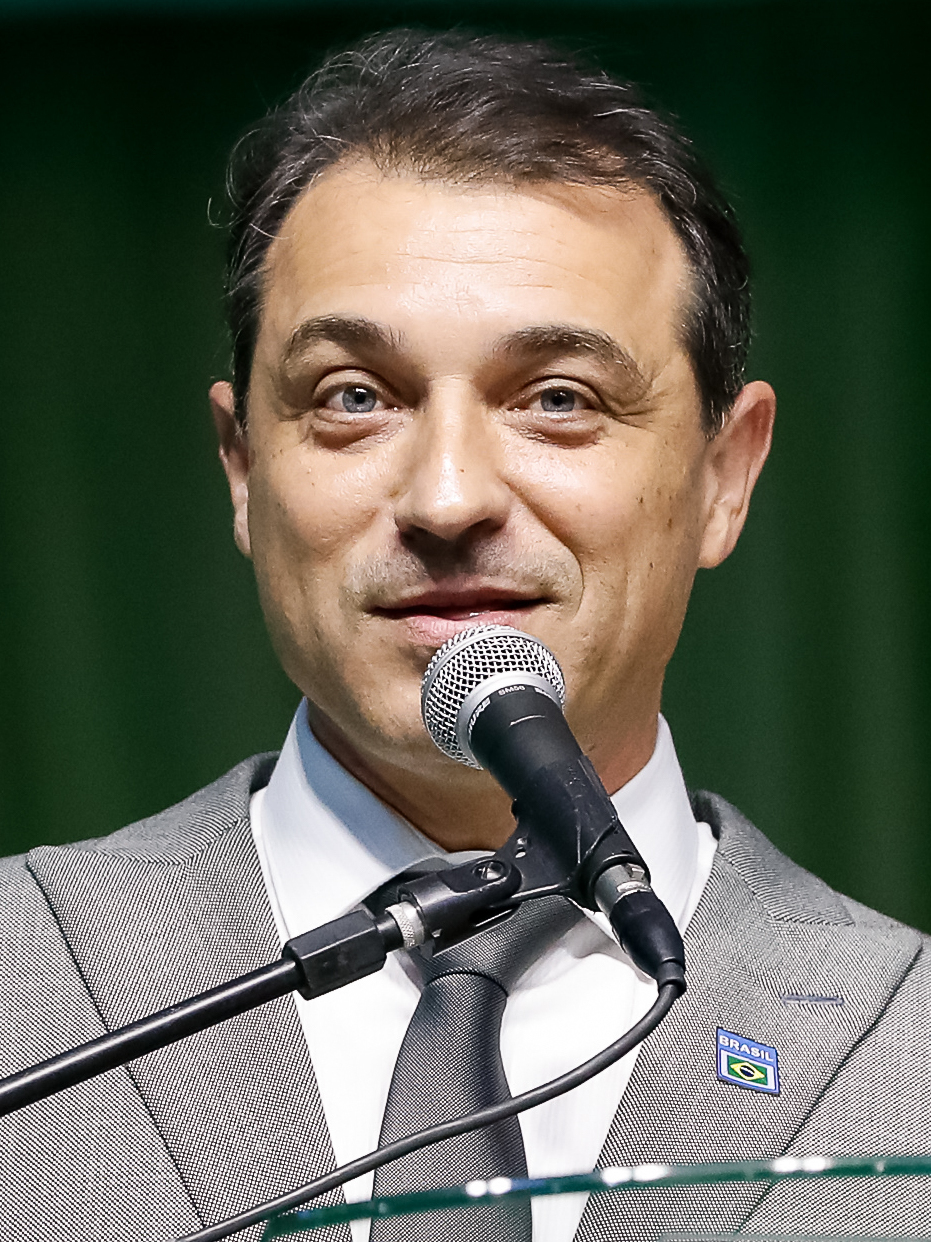

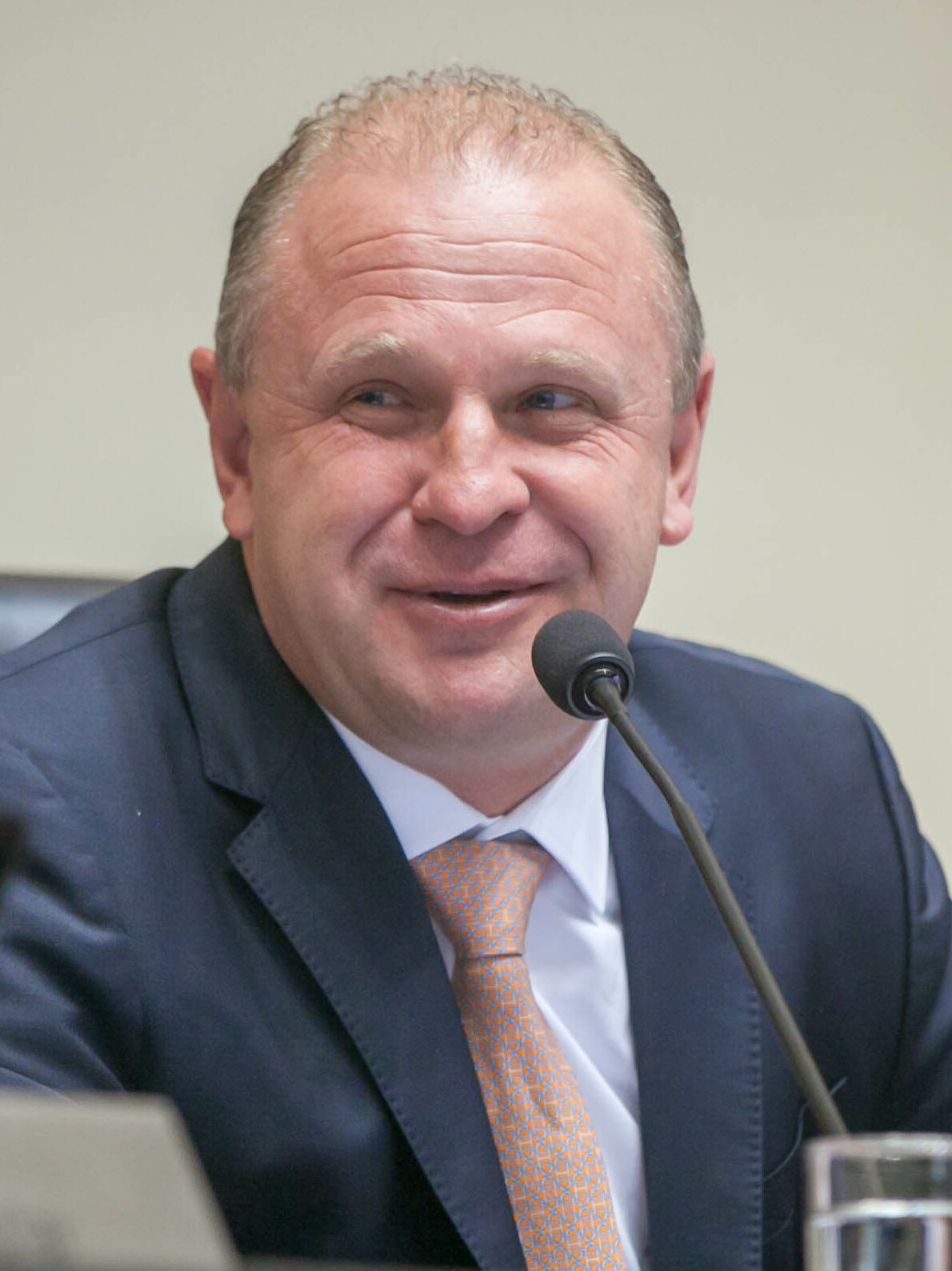
Candidate	Carlos Moisés	Gelson Merisio
Party	PSL	PSD
Running mate	Daniela Reinehr	João Paulo Keinübing
Popular vote	2,644,179	1,075,242
Percentage	71.09%	28.91%
Election result per municipality in the 2nd round:
Carlos Moisés
50–59%
60-69%
70-79%
80-89%
Gelson Merísio
50–59%
60-69%
Governor before election
Eduardo Pinho Moreira
MDB
Elected Governor
Carlos Moisés
PSL
- Senatorial election
- 7 October 2018 (one-only round)
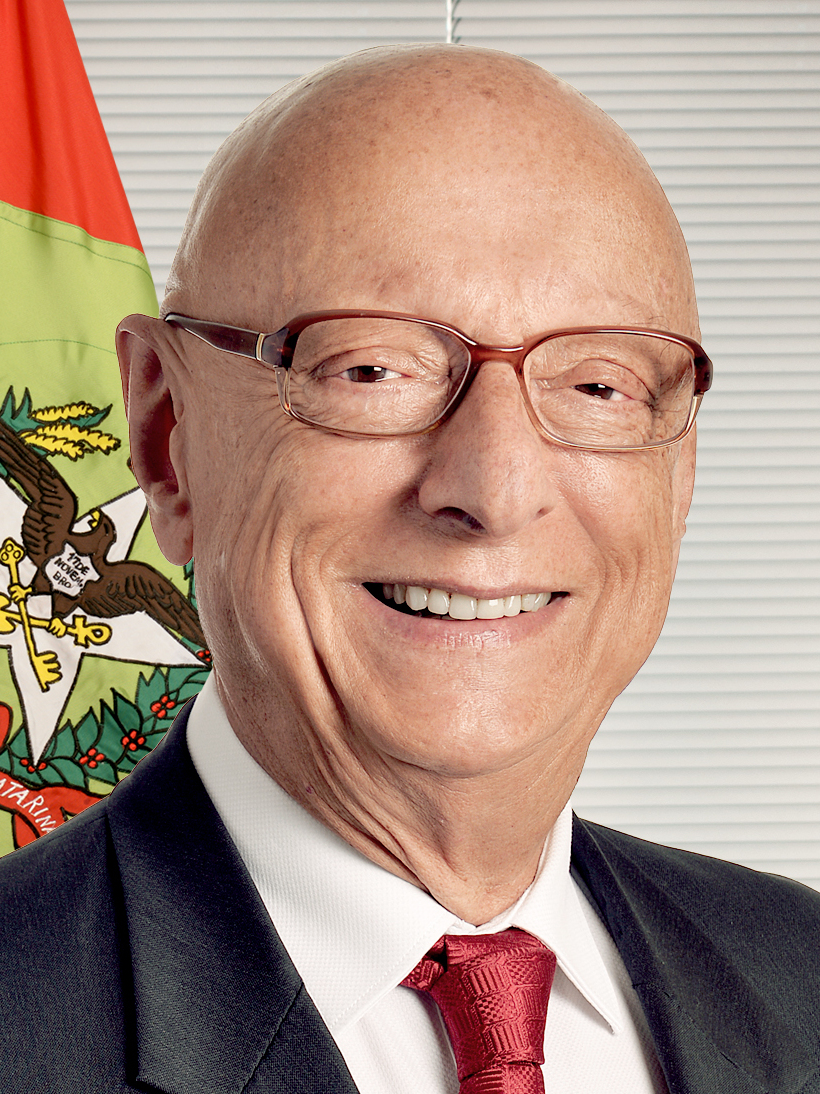

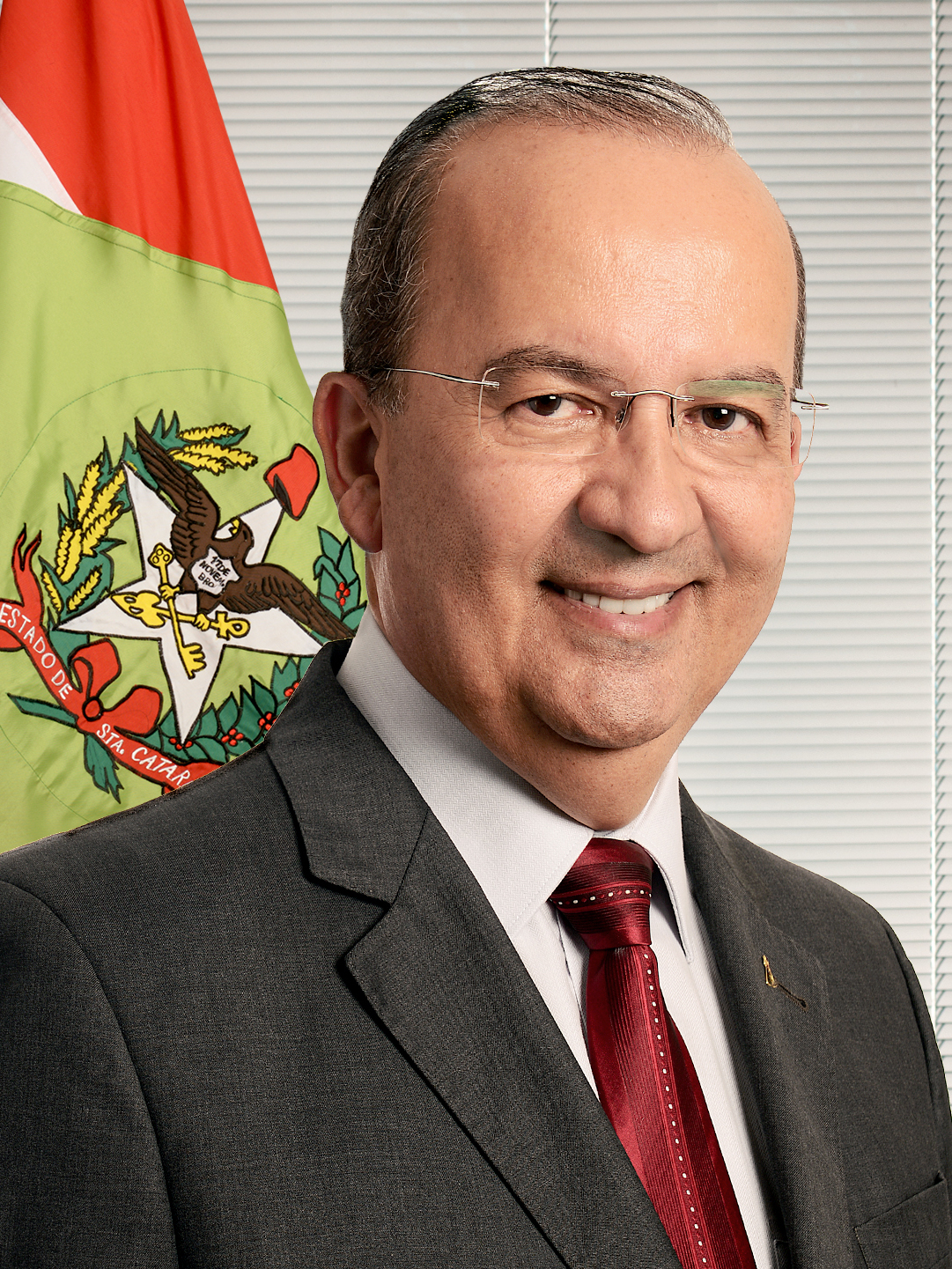
Candidate	Esperidião Amin	Jorginho Mello
Party	PP	PR
Popular vote	1,226,064	1,179,757
Percentage	18.78%	18.07%
Election result per municipality:
Esperidião Amin
10–19%
20–29%
30–39%
Lucas Esmeraldino
10–19%
20-29%
30-39%
Paulo Bauer
20–29%
Jorginho Mello
10–19%
20–29%
30-39%
Raimundo Colombo
10–19%
20–29%
30-39%
Ideli Salvatti
10–19%
20–29%
Senator before election
Paulo Bauer and Dalírio Beber
PSDB
Elected Senator
Esperidião Amin and Jorginho Mello
PP and PR

The 2018 Santa Catarina state election took place in the state of Santa Catarina, Brazil on 7 October and 28 October 2018. Voters elected a Governor, Vice Governor, two Senators, 16 representatives for the Chamber of Deputies and 40 Legislative Assembly members. The incumbent Governor, Eduardo Pinho Moreira (PSD) was eligible for a second term, but didn't run for re-election. Military firefighter Carlos Moisés (PSL) won in the second round against state representative Gelson Merisio (PSD). Gelson Luiz Merisio (Xaxim, January 31, 1966) is a Brazilian business administrator and politician, affiliated with Solidariedade. He was a state deputy and president, in Santa Catarina, of the Social Democratic Party (PSD). Merisio presided over the Legislative Assembly of Santa Catarina between 2010 and 2012.

Incumbent Senators Paulo Bauer (PSDB) and Dalírio Beber (PSDB) ran for re-election, losing to former governor Esperidião Amin (PP) and congressman Jorginho Mello (PR).

== Candidates ==
=== Governor ===
==== Candidates in runoff ====
Party	Candidate	Most relevant political office or occupation	Party	Running mate	Coalition	Electoral number
Social Liberal Party (PSL)	Carlos Moisés	Military firefighter	Social Liberal Party (PSL)	Daniela Reinehr	—N/a	17
Social Democratic Party (PSD)	Gelson Merisio	Member of the Legislative Assembly of Santa Catarina (2005–2019)	Democrats (DEM)	João Paulo Kleinübing	This is Work: Social Democratic Party (PSD); Democrats (DEM); Progressistas (PP); Brazilian Socialist Party (PSB); Democratic Labour Party (PDT); Brazilian Republican Party (PRB); Communist Party of Brazil (PCdoB); Podemos (PODE); Social Christian Party (PSC); Solidariedade; Republican Party of the Social Order (PROS); Green Party (PV); Humanist Party of Solidarity (PHS); Progressive Republican Party (PRP); Free Fatherland Party (PPL)	55

==== Candidates failing to make runoff ====
Party	Candidate	Most relevant political office or occupation	Party	Running mate	Coalition	Electoral number
Workers' Party (PT)	Décio Lima	Member of the Chamber of Deputies (2007–2019)	Workers' Party (PT)	Alcimar Oliveira	—N/a	13
Brazilian Democratic Movement (MDB)	Mauro Mariani	Member of the Chamber of Deputies (2007–2019)	Brazilian Social Democracy Party (PSDB)	Napoleão Bernardes	Santa Catarina Wants More: Brazilian Democratic Movement (MDB); Brazilian Social Democracy Party (PSDB); Party of the Republic (PR); Brazilian Labour Party (PTB); Popular Socialist Party (PPS); Avante; Christian Democracy (DC); Brazilian Labour Renewal Party (PRTB); Christian Labour Party (PTC)	15
United Socialist Workers' Party (PSTU)	Ingrid Assis	High school teacher	United Socialist Workers' Party (PSTU)	Ederson da Silva	—N/a	16
Sustainability Network (REDE)	Rogério Portanova	Higher education professor	Sustainability Network (REDE)	Regina Santos	—N/a	18
Socialism and Liberty Party (PSOL)	Leonel Camasão	Journalist	Brazilian Communist Party (PCB)	Caroline Bellaguarda	A Way for Us: Socialism and Liberty Party (PSOL); Brazilian Communist Party (PCB)	50
Patriota	Jessé Pereira	Evangelical priest	Patriota	Danny Jumes	—N/a	51

=== Senator ===
Party	Candidate	Most relevant political office or occupation	Party	Candidates for Alternate Senators	Coalition	Electoral number
Progressistas (PP)	Esperidião Amin	Governor of Santa Catarina (1999–2003)	Social Democratic Party (PSD)	1st alternate senator: Geraldo Althoff	This is Work: Social Democratic Party (PSD); Democrats (DEM); Progressistas (PP); Brazilian Socialist Party (PSB); Democratic Labour Party (PDT); Brazilian Republican Party (PRB); Communist Party of Brazil (PCdoB); Podemos (PODE); Social Christian Party (PSC); Solidariedade; Republican Party of the Social Order (PROS); Green Party (PV); Humanist Party of Solidarity (PHS); Progressive Republican Party (PRP); Free Fatherland Party (PPL)	111
Progressistas (PP)	Esperidião Amin	Governor of Santa Catarina (1999–2003)	Social Democratic Party (PSD)	2nd alternate senator: Denise Santos	This is Work: Social Democratic Party (PSD); Democrats (DEM); Progressistas (PP); Brazilian Socialist Party (PSB); Democratic Labour Party (PDT); Brazilian Republican Party (PRB); Communist Party of Brazil (PCdoB); Podemos (PODE); Social Christian Party (PSC); Solidariedade; Republican Party of the Social Order (PROS); Green Party (PV); Humanist Party of Solidarity (PHS); Progressive Republican Party (PRP); Free Fatherland Party (PPL)	111
Social Democratic Party (PSD)	Raimundo Colombo	Governor of Santa Catarina (2011–2018)	Progressistas (PP)	1st alternate senator: Jandir Bellini	This is Work: Social Democratic Party (PSD); Democrats (DEM); Progressistas (PP); Brazilian Socialist Party (PSB); Democratic Labour Party (PDT); Brazilian Republican Party (PRB); Communist Party of Brazil (PCdoB); Podemos (PODE); Social Christian Party (PSC); Solidariedade; Republican Party of the Social Order (PROS); Green Party (PV); Humanist Party of Solidarity (PHS); Progressive Republican Party (PRP); Free Fatherland Party (PPL)	555
Social Democratic Party (PSD)	Raimundo Colombo	Governor of Santa Catarina (2011–2018)	Social Christian Party (PSC)	2nd alternate senator: Narcizo Parisotto	This is Work: Social Democratic Party (PSD); Democrats (DEM); Progressistas (PP); Brazilian Socialist Party (PSB); Democratic Labour Party (PDT); Brazilian Republican Party (PRB); Communist Party of Brazil (PCdoB); Podemos (PODE); Social Christian Party (PSC); Solidariedade; Republican Party of the Social Order (PROS); Green Party (PV); Humanist Party of Solidarity (PHS); Progressive Republican Party (PRP); Free Fatherland Party (PPL)	555
Workers' Party (PT)		Secretary of Human Rights (2014–2015)	Workers' Party (PT)	1st alternate senator: Mariluci Deschamps	—N/a	130
Workers' Party (PT)		Secretary of Human Rights (2014–2015)	Workers' Party (PT)	2nd alternate senator: Derci Pasqualotto	—N/a	130
Workers' Party (PT)	Lédio Rosa	Desembargador of the Court of Justice of Santa Catarina	Workers' Party (PT)	1st alternate senator: Vanio dos Santos	—N/a	131
Workers' Party (PT)	Lédio Rosa	Desembargador of the Court of Justice of Santa Catarina	Workers' Party (PT)	2nd alternate senator: Írio Correia	—N/a	131
United Socialist Workers' Party (PSTU)	Ricardo Lautert	High school teacher	United Socialist Workers' Party (PSTU)	1st alternate senator: Roque Pegoraro	—N/a	160
United Socialist Workers' Party (PSTU)	Ricardo Lautert	High school teacher	United Socialist Workers' Party (PSTU)	2nd alternate senator: Pedro Rogel	—N/a	160
Social Liberal Party	Lucas Esmeraldino	Entrepreneur	Social Liberal Party	1st alternate senator: Marcelo Brigadeiro	—N/a	177
Social Liberal Party	Lucas Esmeraldino	Entrepreneur	Social Liberal Party	2nd alternate senator: Marco de Carvalho	—N/a	177
Sustainability Network (REDE)	Miriam Prochnow	Pedagogue and environmentalist	Sustainability Network (REDE)	1st alternate senator: Nelson Zunino	—N/a	181
Sustainability Network (REDE)	Miriam Prochnow	Pedagogue and environmentalist	Sustainability Network (REDE)	2nd alternate senator:	—N/a	181
Sustainability Network (REDE)	Diego Mezzogiorno	Bachelor of Hotel Managing	Sustainability Network (REDE)	1st alternate senator: Heli Schlickmann	—N/a	188
Sustainability Network (REDE)	Diego Mezzogiorno	Bachelor of Hotel Managing	Sustainability Network (REDE)	2nd alternate senator: Alexandre Lemos	—N/a	188
Party of the Republic (PR)	Jorginho Mello	Member of the Chamber of Deputies (2011–2019)	Brazilian Democratic Movement (MDB)	1st alternate senator: Ivete da Silveira	Santa Catarina Wants More: Brazilian Democratic Movement (MDB); Brazilian Social Democracy Party (PSDB); Party of the Republic (PR); Brazilian Labour Party (PTB); Popular Socialist Party (PPS); Avante; Christian Democracy (DC); Brazilian Labour Renewal Party (PRTB); Christian Labour Party (PTC)	222
Party of the Republic (PR)	Jorginho Mello	Member of the Chamber of Deputies (2011–2019)	Brazilian Social Democracy Party (PSDB)	2nd alternate senator: Beto Martins	Santa Catarina Wants More: Brazilian Democratic Movement (MDB); Brazilian Social Democracy Party (PSDB); Party of the Republic (PR); Brazilian Labour Party (PTB); Popular Socialist Party (PPS); Avante; Christian Democracy (DC); Brazilian Labour Renewal Party (PRTB); Christian Labour Party (PTC)	222
Brazilian Social Democracy Party (PSDB)	Paulo Bauer	Senator for Santa Catarina (2011–2019)	Brazilian Democratic Movement (MDB)	1st alternate senator: Casildo Maldaner	Santa Catarina Wants More: Brazilian Democratic Movement (MDB); Brazilian Social Democracy Party (PSDB); Party of the Republic (PR); Brazilian Labour Party (PTB); Popular Socialist Party (PPS); Avante; Christian Democracy (DC); Brazilian Labour Renewal Party (PRTB); Christian Labour Party (PTC)	456
Brazilian Social Democracy Party (PSDB)	Paulo Bauer	Senator for Santa Catarina (2011–2019)	Brazilian Social Democracy Party (PSDB)	2nd alternate senator: Sandro Giassi	Santa Catarina Wants More: Brazilian Democratic Movement (MDB); Brazilian Social Democracy Party (PSDB); Party of the Republic (PR); Brazilian Labour Party (PTB); Popular Socialist Party (PPS); Avante; Christian Democracy (DC); Brazilian Labour Renewal Party (PRTB); Christian Labour Party (PTC)	456
Party of National Mobilization (PMN)	Roberto Salum	Member of the Legislative Assembly of Santa Catarina (2017–2018)	Party of National Mobilization (PMN)	1st alternate senator: Airton Zanella	Santa Catarina in First Place: Party of National Mobilization (PMN); Patriota	331
Party of National Mobilization (PMN)	Roberto Salum	Member of the Legislative Assembly of Santa Catarina (2017–2018)	Patriota	2nd alternate senator: Ailson Barroso	Santa Catarina in First Place: Party of National Mobilization (PMN); Patriota	331
Socialism and Liberty Party (PSOL)	Pedro Cabral	Middle school teacher	Socialism and Liberty Party (PSOL)	1st alternate senator: Francisco Cordeiro	A Way for Us: Socialism and Liberty Party (PSOL); Brazilian Communist Party (PCB)	500
Socialism and Liberty Party (PSOL)	Pedro Cabral	Middle school teacher	Socialism and Liberty Party (PSOL)	2nd alternate senator: Robson Ceron	A Way for Us: Socialism and Liberty Party (PSOL); Brazilian Communist Party (PCB)	500
Socialism and Liberty Party (PSOL)	Antônio Campos	Higher education professor	Socialism and Liberty Party (PSOL)	1st alternate senator: Ademir Kuhn	A Way for Us: Socialism and Liberty Party (PSOL); Brazilian Communist Party (PCB)	505
Socialism and Liberty Party (PSOL)	Antônio Campos	Higher education professor	Socialism and Liberty Party (PSOL)	2nd alternate senator: Dilene Trevisol	A Way for Us: Socialism and Liberty Party (PSOL); Brazilian Communist Party (PCB)	505

== Results ==
=== Governor ===
Candidate	Running mate	Party	First round		Second round	
Candidate	Running mate	Party	Votes	%	Votes	%
Carlos Moisés	Daniela Reinehr	PSL	1,071,406	29.72	2,644,179	71.09
Gelson Merisio	João Paulo Kleinübing (DEM)	PSD	1,121,869	31.12	1,075,242	28.91
Mauro Mariani	Napoleão Bernardes (PSDB)	MDB	836,844	23.21		
Décio Lima	Alcimar Oliveira	PT	460,889	12.78		
Leonel Camasão	Caroline Bellaguarda (PCB)	PSOL	72,133	2.00		
Rogério Portanova	Regina Santos	REDE	18,710	0.52		
Jessé Pereira	Danny Jumes	Patriota	13,472	0.37		
Ingrid Assis	Ederson da Silva	PSTU	9,944	0.28		
Total			3,605,267	100.00	3,719,421	100.00
Valid votes			3,605,267	85.00	3,719,421	88.27
Invalid votes			375,916	8.86	342,415	8.13
Blank votes			260,484	6.14	151,683	3.60
Total votes			4,241,667	100.00	4,213,519	100.00
Registered voters/turnout			5,068,421	83.69	5,068,421	83.13
PSL gain from MDB						

Popular vote (first round)
Merisio	31.12%
Moisés	29.72%
Mariani	23.21%
Lima	12.78%
Others	3.17%

Popular vote (second round)
Moisés	71.09%
Merisio	28.91%

=== Senator ===
Candidate	Party	Votes	%
Esperidião Amin	PP	1,226,064	18.77
Jorginho Mello	PR	1,179,757	18.07
Lucas Esmeraldino	PSL	1,161,662	17.79
Raimundo Colombo	PSD	999,043	15.30
Paulo Bauer (incumbent)	PSDB	802,037	12.28
Ideli Salvatti	PT	336,449	5.15
Lédio Andrade	PT	327,226	5.01
Roberto Salum	PMN	246,686	3.78
Miriam Prochnow	REDE	84,486	1.29
Pedro Cabral	PSOL	63,523	0.97
Antônio Campos	PSOL	51,191	0.78
Diego Mezzogiorno	REDE	38,470	0.59
Ricardo Lautert	PSTU	13,845	0.21
Total		6,530,439	100.00
Valid votes		6,530,439	76.98
Invalid votes		1,179,990	13.91
Blank votes		772,905	9.11
Total votes		8,483,334	100.00
Registered voters/turnout		10,136,842	83.69
PP gain from PSDB			
PR gain from PSDB			

=== Chamber of Deputies ===
Party	Votes	%	Seats	+/–
Social Liberal Party	769,926	21.70	4	▲4
Brazilian Democratic Movement	553,953	15.61	3	▼2
Workers' Party	347,166	9.78	2	Steady
Brazilian Social Democracy Party	301,400	8.49	1	▼1
Progressistas	288,537	8.13	1	▼1
Social Democratic Party	227,422	6.41	1	▼2
Brazilian Republican Party	188,145	5.30	1	▲1
New Party	187,440	5.28	1	New
Brazilian Socialist Party	156,127	4.40	1	▼1
Popular Socialist Party	93,752	2.64	1	Steady
Party of the Republic	69,382	1.96	0	▼1
Socialism and Liberty Party	68,051	1.92	0	Steady
Social Christian Party	39,161	1.10	0	Steady
Democratic Labour Party	36,577	1.03	0	Steady
Solidariedade	35,667	1.01	0	Steady
Democrats	29,365	0.83	0	Steady
Communist Party of Brazil	24,019	0.68	0	Steady
Progressive Republican Party	22,762	0.64	0	Steady
Patriota	18,460	0.52	0	Steady
Republican Party of the Social Order	17,372	0.49	0	Steady
Brazilian Labour Party	11,593	0.33	0	Steady
Sustainability Network	9,956	0.28	0	New
Podemos	8,577	0.24	0	Steady
Christian Labour Party	7,690	0.22	0	Steady
Free Fatherland Party	7,447	0.21	0	Steady
Party of National Mobilization	6,623	0.19	0	Steady
Avante	4,935	0.14	0	Steady
Green Party	4,791	0.14	0	Steady
Christian Democracy	3,607	0.10	0	Steady
Brazilian Communist Party	3,020	0.09	0	Steady
United Socialist Workers' Party	2,943	0.08	0	Steady
Humanist Party of Solidarity	1,580	0.04	0	Steady
Brazilian Labour Renewal Party	1,012	0.03	0	Steady
Total	3,548,458	100.00	16	–
Valid votes	3,548,458	83.66		
Invalid votes	391,519	9.23		
Blank votes	301,690	7.11		
Total votes	4,241,667	100.00		
Registered voters/turnout	5,068,421	83.69		

=== Legislative Assembly ===
Party	Votes	%	Seats	+/–
Brazilian Democratic Movement	619,681	16.92	9	▼1
Social Liberal Party	553,121	15.10	6	▲6
Social Democratic Party	418,273	11.42	5	▼4
Workers' Party	326,608	8.92	4	▼1
Progressistas	314,665	8.59	3	▼1
Brazilian Socialist Party	293,867	8.02	3	▲1
Brazilian Social Democracy Party	285,228	7.79	2	▼2
Party of the Republic	193,090	5.27	3	▲1
Democratic Labour Party	119,780	3.27	2	▲1
Democrats	73,662	2.01	0	▼1
Brazilian Republican Party	70,404	1.92	1	▲1
Socialism and Liberty Party	68,143	1.86	0	Steady
Podemos	66,391	1.81	0	Steady
Popular Socialist Party	43,668	1.19	0	▼1
Social Christian Party	42,160	1.15	1	▲1
Solidariedade	37,131	1.01	0	Steady
Communist Party of Brazil	25,810	0.70	0	▼1
Sustainability Network	18,279	0.50	0	New
Patriota	17,732	0.48	0	Steady
Green Party	17,428	0.48	1	▲1
Brazilian Labour Party	15,912	0.43	0	Steady
Party of National Mobilization	13,236	0.36	0	Steady
Progressive Republican Party	12,656	0.35	0	Steady
Christian Labour Party	3,670	0.10	0	Steady
Republican Party of the Social Order	3,279	0.09	0	Steady
United Socialist Workers' Party	2,226	0.06	0	Steady
Humanist Party of Solidarity	1,864	0.05	0	Steady
Free Fatherland Party	1,688	0.05	0	Steady
Christian Democracy	1,393	0.04	0	Steady
Brazilian Communist Party	1,071	0.03	0	Steady
Avante	683	0.02	0	Steady
Brazilian Labour Renewal Party	472	0.01	0	Steady
Total	3,663,271	100.00	40	–
Valid votes	3,663,271	86.36		
Invalid votes	309,397	7.29		
Blank votes	268,999	6.34		
Total votes	4,241,667	100.00		
Registered voters/turnout	5,068,421	83.69		
