= 2018 Brazilian gubernatorial elections =

- October 7, 2010 (1st round); October 28, 2010 (2nd round)
- Results of parties elected by states

Gubernatorial elections were held in Brazil on 7 October 2018 as part of the nationwide general elections to elect tickets with state governors and their vice governors (as well as the Governor of the Federal District and their vice governor). A second round was held on 28 October.

== Results ==
The Governors elected in 2018 were the following:

State	Candidates (1st round)	Candidates (2nd round)	Winner / Party	
Acre	Coronel Ulysses (PSL); David Hall (AVANTE); Gladson Cameli (PP); Janaína Furtado (REDE); Marcus Alexandre (PT)		Gladson Cameli	PP
Alagoas	Basile Christopoulos (PSOL); Josan Leite (PSL); Melquezedeque Farias (PCO); Pinto de Luna (PROS); Renan Filho (MDB)		Renan Filho	MDB
Amapá	Capi (PSB); Cirilo Fernandes (PSL); Davi Alcolumbre (DEM); Gianfranco Gusmão (PSTU); Waldez Góes (PDT)	Capi (PSB) Waldez Góes (PDT)	Waldez Góes	PDT
Amazonas	Amazonino Mendes (PDT); Berg da UGT (PSOL); David Almeida (PSB); Lúcia Antony (PCdoB); Omar Aziz (PSD); Sidney Cabral (PSTU); Wilson Lima (PSC)	Wilson Lima (PSC) Amazonino Mendes (PDT)	Wilson Lima	PSC
Bahia	(PRTB); João Santana (MDB); José Ronaldo (DEM); Marcos Mendes (PSOL); Orlando Andrade (PCO); Rui Costa (PT)		Rui Costa	PT
Ceará	Aílton Lopes (PSOL); Camilo Santana (PT); Francisco Gonzaga (PSTU); General Theophilo (PSDB); Hélio Góis (PSL); Mikaelton Carantino (PCO)		Camilo Santana	PT
Federal District	Alberto Fraga (DEM); Alexandre Guerra (NOVO); Eliana Pedrosa (PROS); Fátima Sousa (PSOL); General Paulo Chagas (PRP); Guillen (PSTU); Ibaneis Rocha (MDB); Júlio Miragaya(PT); Renan Rosa (PCO); Rodrigo Rollemberg (PSB); Rogério Rosso (PSD)	Ibaneis Rocha (MDB) Rodrigo Rollemberg (PSB)	Ibaneis Rocha	MDB
Espírito Santo	André Moreira (PSOL); Jackeline (PT); Carlos Manato (PSL); Aridelmo Teixeira (PTB); Renato Casagrande (PSB); Rose de Freitas (PODE)		Renato Casagrande	PSB
Goiás	Alda Lucia (PCO); Daniel Vilela (MDB); Kátia Maria (PT); Marcelo Lira (PCB); Ronaldo Caiado (DEM); Weslei Garcia (PSOL); José Eliton (PSDB)		Ronaldo Caiado	DEM
Maranhão	Flávio Dino (PCdoB); Maura Jorge (PSL); Odívio Neto (PSOL); Ramon Zapata (PSTU); Roberto Rocha (PSDB); Roseana Sarney (MDB)		Flávio Dino	PCdoB
Mato Grosso	Arthur Nogueira (REDE); Mauro Mendes (DEM); Moisés Franz (PSOL); Pedro Taques (PSDB); Wellington Fagundes (PR)		Mauro Mendes	DEM
Mato Grosso do Sul	Humberto Amaducci (PT); João Alfredo (PSOL); Juiz Odilon (PDT); Junior Mochi (MDB); Marcelo Bluma (PV); Reinaldo Azambuja (PSDB)	Reinaldo Azambuja (PSDB) Juiz Odilon (PDT)	Reinaldo Azambuja	PSDB
Minas Gerais	Adalclever Ribeiro Lopes (MDB) Alexandre Flach Domingues (PCO); Antonio Anastasia (PSDB); Claudiney Dulim (AVANTE); Dirlene Marques (PSOL); Fernando Pimentel (PT); João Batista Mares Guia (REDE); Jordano Metalúrgico (PSTU); Romeu Zema (NOVO)	Romeu Zema (NOVO) Antonio Anastasia (PSDB)	Romeu Zema	NOVO
Paraná	Cida Borghetti (PP); Doutor Rosinha (PT); Geonísio Marinho (PRTB); João Arruda (MDB); Jorge Bernardi (REDE); Ogier Buchi (PSL); Priscila Ebara (PCO); Professor Ivan Bernardo (PSTU); Professor Piva (PSOL); Ratinho Junior (PSD)		Ratinho Junior	PSD
Paraibá	João Azevêdo (PSB); José Maranhão (MDB); Lucélio Cartaxo (PV); Rama Dantas (PSTU); Tárcio Teixeira (PSOL)		João Azevêdo	PSB
Pará	Cléber Rabelo (PSTU); Fernando Carneiro (PSOL); Helder Barbalho (MDB); Márcio Miranda (DEM) Paulo Rocha (PT)	Helder Barbalho (MDB) Márcio Miranda (DEM)	Helder Barbalho	MDB
Pernambuco	Ana Patrícia Alves (PCO); Armando Monteiro (PTB); Dani Portela (PSOL); Júlio Lóssio (REDE); Maurício Rands (PROS); Paulo Câmara (PSB); Simone Fontana (PSTU)		Paulo Câmara	PSB
Piauí	José Pessoa Leal (SD); Elmano Férrer (PODE); Fábio Sérvio (PSL); Luciane Santos (PSTU); Luciano Nunes (PSDB); Maria de Lourdes (PCO); Professora Sueli (PSOL); Romualdo Seno (DC); Valter Alencar (PSC); Wellington Dias (PT)		Wellington Dias	PT
Rio de Janeiro	André Monteiro (PRTB); Anthony Garotinho (PRP); Dayse Oliveira (PSTU); Eduardo Paes (DEM); Indio da Costa (PSD); Luiz Eugênio (PCO); Marcelo Trindade (NOVO); Márcia Tiburi (PT); Pedro Fernandes (PDT); Romário (PODE); Tarcísio Motta (PSOL); Wilson Witzel (PSC)	Wilson Witzel (PSC) Eduardo Paes (DEM)	Wilson Witzel	PSC
Rio Grande do Norte	Brenno Queiroga (SD); Carlos Eduardo Alves (PDT); Dário Barbosa (PSTU); Fátima Bezerra (PT); Freitas Júnior (REDE); Heró Bezerra (PRTB); Professor Carlos Alberto (PSOL); Robinson Faria (PSD)	Fátima Bezerra (PT) Carlos Eduardo (PDT)	Fátima Bezerra	PT
Rio Grande do Sul	Eduardo Leite (PSDB); Jairo Jorge (PDT); José Ivo Sartori (MDB); Julio Flores (PSTU); Mateus Bandeira (NOVO); Miguel Rossetto (PT); Paulo Medeiros (PCO); Roberto Robaina (PSOL)	Eduardo Leite (PSDB) José Ivo Sartori (MDB)	Eduardo Leite	PSDB
Rondônia	Acir Gurgacz (PDT); Valclei Queiroz (PMB); Coronel Charlon (PRTB); Coronel Marcos Rocha (PSL); Expedito Júnior (PSDB); Maurão de Carvalho (MDB); Pedro Nazareno (PSTU); Pimenta de Rondônia (PSOL); Vinícius Miguel (REDE)	Coronel Marcos Rocha (PSL) Expedito Júnior (PSDB)	Coronel Marcos Rocha	PSL
Roraima	Anchieta Júnior (PSDB); Antônio Denarium (PSL); Fábio Almeida (PSOL); Suely Campos (PP); Telmário Mota (PTB)	Antônio Denarium (PSL) Anchieta Júnior (PSDB)	Antônio Denarium	PSL
São Paulo	João Doria (PSDB); Lilian Miranda (PCO); Luiz Marinho (PT); Major Costa e Silva (DC); Marcelo Cândido (PDT); Marcio França (PSB); Paulo Skaf (MDB); Prof. Claudio Fernando (PMN); Professora Lisete (PSOL); Rodrigo Tavares (PRTB); Rogério Chequer (NOVO); Toninho Ferreira (PSTU)	João Doria (PSDB) Marcio França (PSB)	João Doria	PSDB
Santa Catarina	Ângelo Castro (PCO); Comandante Moisés (PSL); Décio Lima (PT); Gelson Merisio (PSD); Ingrid Assis (PSTU); Jessé Pereira (PATRI); Leonel Camasão (PSOL); Mauro Mariani (MDB); Rogério Portanova (Rede)	Comandante Moisés (PSL) Gelson Merisio (PSD)	Comandante Moisés	PSL
Sergipe	Belivaldo Chagas (PSD); Dr. Emerson (REDE); Eduardo Amorim (PSDB); Gilvani Santos (PSTU); João Tarantella (PSL); Márcio Souza (PSOL); Mendonça Prado (DEM); Milton Andrade (PMN); Valadares Filho (PSB)	Belivaldo Chagas (PSD) Valadares Filho (PSB)	Belivaldo Chagas	PSD
Tocantins	Bernadete Aparecida (PSOL); Carlos Amastha (PSB); César Simoni (PSL); Márlon Reis (REDE); Mauro Carlesse (PHS)		Mauro Carlesse	PHS
