= Jorginho Mello =

Brazilian politician (born 1956)

- Official portrait

Governor of Santa Catarina
- Incumbent
- Assumed office 1 January 2023
- Lieutenant: Marilisa Boehm
- Preceded by: Carlos Moisés

Senator for Santa Catarina
- In office 1 February 2019 – 29 December 2022
- Succeeded by: Ivete da Silveira

Member of the Chamber of Deputies
- In office 1 February 2011 – 1 February 2019
- Constituency: Santa Catarina

State Deputy of Santa Catarina
- In office 1 February 1995 – 1 February 2011
- Constituency: At-large

Councillor of Herval d'Oeste
- In office 1976–1980
- Constituency: At-large

Personal details
- Born: Jorginho dos Santos Mello; 15 July 1956 (age 70) Ibicaré, Santa Catarina, Brazil
- Party: PL (since 2013)
- Other political affiliations: See list: PROS (2013); PSDB (2001–2013); PL (1985–2001); PDS (1980–1985); ARENA (1974–1980)
- Spouse: Elizete de Jesus Freitas (divorced)
- Awards: Order of Aeronautical Merit (Grand Officer) (Note: Portuguese: Ordem do Mérito Aeronáutico - Grande-Oficial)

Jorginho dos Santos Mello (born 15 July 1956) is a Brazilian politician, member of the Liberal Party (PL). He is the incumbent Governor of Santa Catarina and had served as Senator from 2019 to 2022. He resigned to run for the state governorship, being replaced by his substitute Ivete da Silveira (MDB). Mello is the Liberal Party state president.

== Career ==
Mello was born in Ibicaré, Santa Catarina before moving 20 kilometers away to Herval d'Oeste as a child.

Mello had served as state representative in the Legislative Assembly 13th, 14th, 15th and 16th Legislatures He was later elected for the Chamber of Deputies for the 54th and 55th Legislatures, representing the state in the National Congress lower house.

He voted for the impeachment of Dilma Rousseff. During the Michel Temer administration, Mello voted in favor of the Constitutional Amendment of the Public Expenditure Cap. In April 2017, he was favorable to the Labour Reform. In August, he voted to open an investigation against president Temer.

In the 2018 election, Mello was elected for the Federal Senate for Santa Catarina, gaining 1,179,757 votes (18.07% of the valid votes), and winning opponents such as then senator Paulo Bauer (PSDB) and former governor Raimundo Colombo (PSD).

In 2019, president Jair Bolsonaro signed Complementary Law no. 167, which creates the Simple Credit Company, after amendments suggested by Mello.

In the 2022 election, Mello was elected Governor of Santa Catarina on the second round, gaining 2,983,949 votes (70.69% of the valid votes), being the highest percentage in state elections in that year.

== Elections ==
Year	Role	Party	Partner	Party	Votes	Result	References
1994	State Deputy	PL	None		0.86% 19,104	Elected	
1998	State Deputy	PSDB	None		1,08% 26,825	Elected	
2002	State Deputy	PSDB	None		1.11% 34.486	Elected	
2006	State Deputy	PSDB	None		1.64% 54.002	Elected	
2010	Federal Deputy	PSDB	None		3.59% 119.757	Elected	
2014	Federal Deputy	PR	None		4.15% 140.839	Elected	
2018	Senator	PR	Ivete da Silveira	MDB	18.07% 1.179.757	Elected	
2018	Senator	PR	Beto Martins	PSDB	18.07% 1.179.757	Elected	
2022	Governor	PL	Marilisa Boehm	PL	38.61% 1.575.912	Second Round	
2022	Governor	PL	Marilisa Boehm	PL	70.69% 2.983.949	Elected	

== Notes ==
Political offices
Preceded by Carlos Moisés	Governor of Santa Catarina; 2023–present	Incumbent
