= Ivete da Silveira =

Brazilian teacher and politician (b. 1943)

- Official portrait

Senator for Santa Catarina
- Incumbent
- Assumed office 30 December 2022
- Preceded by: Jorginho Mello
- Succeeded by: Carlos Bolsonaro (elect)
- In office 24 August 2022 – 20 December 2022
- Preceded by: Jorginho Mello
- Succeeded by: Jorginho Mello

First Lady of Santa Catarina
- In office 1 January 2007 – 25 March 2010
- Governor: Luiz Henrique da Silveira
- Preceded by: Ivane Fretta
- Succeeded by: Maria Bernardete Pavan
- In office 1 January 2003 – 9 April 2006
- Governor: Luiz Henrique da Silveira
- Preceded by: Ângela Amin
- Succeeded by: Ivane Fretta

Personal details
- Born: Ivete Marli Appel; 28 May 1943 (age 83) Brusque, Santa Catarina, Brazil
- Party: MDB (1980–present)
- Spouse: Luiz Henrique da Silveira (died 2015)
- Children: 2
- Education: Federal University of Santa Catarina

Ivete Marli Appel da Silveira (born 28 May 1943) is a Brazilian teacher and politician who has been one of the senators from the state of Santa Catarina since 2022. She succeeded Jorginho Mello, who became the governor of Santa Catarina in 2023. She was the wife of former Santa Catarina governor and senator Luiz Henrique da Silveira.
