= Daniela Reinehr =

Brazilian politician (born 1977)

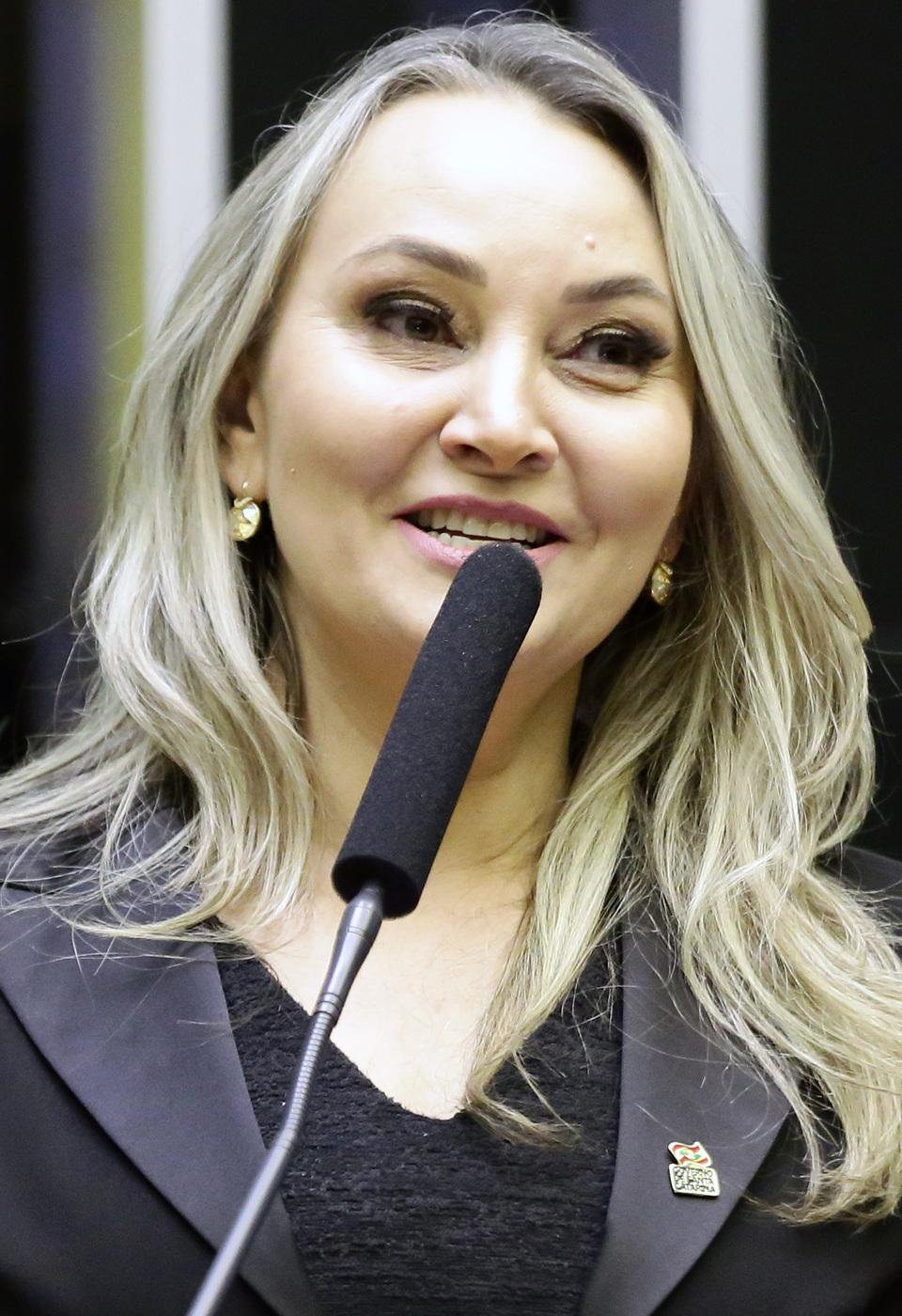
- Reinehr in 2019

Member of the Chamber of Deputies
- Incumbent
- Assumed office 1 February 2023
- Constituency: Santa Catarina

Vice Governor of Santa Catarina
- In office 1 January 2019 – 1 January 2023
- Governor: Carlos Moisés
- Preceded by: Eduardo Pinho Moreira
- Succeeded by: Marilisa Boehm

Personal details
- Born: Daniela Cristian Reinehr; 4 April 1977 (age 49) Maravilha, Santa Catarina, Brazil
- Party: PL (since 2021)
- Other political affiliations: PSL (2018–2019)
- Education: Communitary University of Chapecó Region
- Profession: Lawyer

Daniela Cristina Reinehr (born 4 April 1977) is a Brazilian politician serving as a member of the Chamber of Deputies since 2023. From 2019 to 2022, she served as vice governor of Santa Catarina.

== Biography ==
Daniela Reinehr was born in Maravilha, Santa Catarina. In 1996, before turning 20, she joined the Military Police of the State of Santa Catarina, starting as a soldier and serving for 3 years, remaining until 1999, when she left to graduate in law from the Community University of the Chapecó Region (UnoChapecó). In that city, she worked as a lawyer in the areas of business, administrative, civil and foreign trade law.

In 2016, she joined the national "Nas Ruas" movement, where she became one of the leaders in the mobilizations and participated in the campaign for the impeachment of Dilma Rousseff. A supporter of Operation Car Wash and Jair Bolsonaro, she joined the Social Liberal Party during the 2018 elections.

In the 2018 elections, she ran as a candidate for vice-governor on the ticket with Carlos Moisés, both from the Social Liberal Party. In the first round, her ticket received 29.72% of the valid votes (1,071,406 votes), finishing second to Gelson Merisio of the Social Democratic Party. In a comeback victory in the second round, Carlos Moisés and Daniela Reinehr were elected governor and vice-governor of Santa Catarina with over 70% of the electorate's vote.

While in government, she clashed with Moisés because she wanted greater alignment with Bolsonaro. When Bolsonaro announced his departure from the Social Liberal Party to form a new party, Reinehr followed him. In June 2020, she definitively broke with the governor, stating that she had been isolated on key government issues.

In the 2022 state elections, she was elected federal deputy, representing the Liberal Party (PL).

=== Interim government ===
After the removal of then-governor Carlos Moisés, given the acceptance of the impeachment request against him, she assumed the state government on an interim basis, becoming the first woman to lead the state executive. Daniela returned to the position of vice-governor after a month as interim governor, on 27 November 2020. With the acceptance of the impeachment request against Governor Carlos Moisés in March 2021 by the Special Court of Judgment, she again temporarily occupied the Head of the Executive Branch of Santa Catarina until 7 May 2021, when Moisés was acquitted of the second impeachment request.

=== Links to Jewish Holocaust Denial ===
Daniela is the daughter of Altair Reinehr, a retired professor known for being a Holocaust denier. On 27 October 2020, upon taking office as interim Governor of Santa Catarina, Daniela was questioned by a reporter about her position regarding her father's denialist and neo-Nazi ideas. She, however, evaded the question, stating:

I respect people, regardless of their beliefs; I respect individual rights and freedoms. And any regime that goes against what I believe, against these elements I mentioned, I repudiate.

On October 29, after criticism from Jewish associations, Daniela retracted her statement and responded that she was opposed to Nazism.

Political offices
Preceded by Eduardo Pinho Moreira	Vice Governor of Santa Catarina; 2019–2023	Succeeded by Marilisa Boehm
