= Carlos Moisés =

Brazilian politician

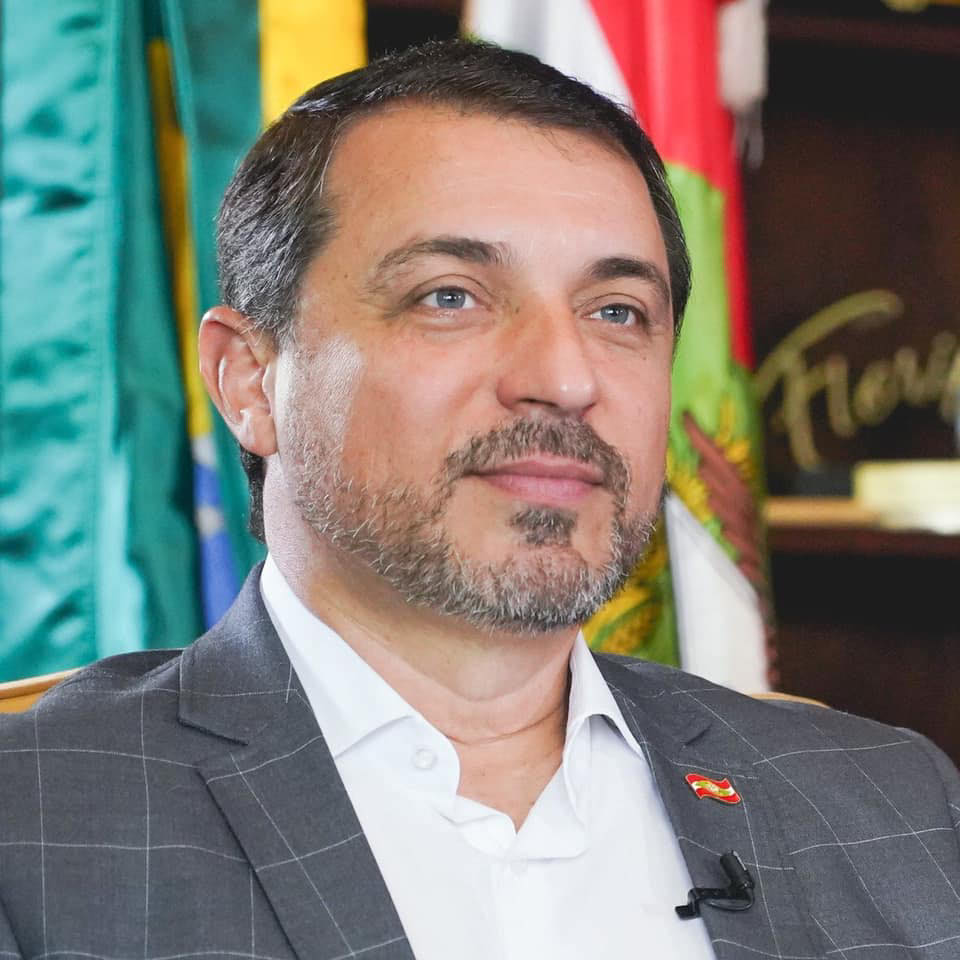

52nd Governor of Santa Catarina
- In office 1 January 2019 – 1 January 2023
- Vice Governor: Daniela Reinehr
- Preceded by: Eduardo Pinho Moreira
- Succeeded by: Jorginho Mello

Personal details
- Born: Carlos Moisés da Silva; 17 August 1967 (age 59) Florianópolis, Santa Catarina, Brazil
- Party: Republicans (2022–present)
- Other political affiliations: PSL (2018–21); Independent (2021–2022)
- Education: University of the South of Santa Catarina (UNISUL)
- Occupation: Military firefighter

Military service
- Allegiance: Brazil
- Branch/service: Military Firefighters Corps
- Years of service: 1987–2016
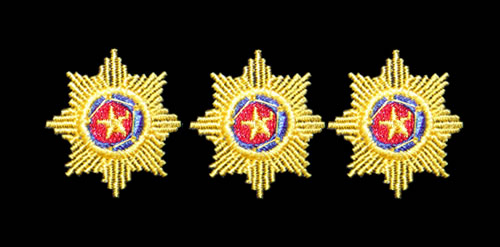
- Rank: Colonel

- Awards: Medal of the Pacifier

Carlos Moisés da Silva (born 17 August 1967), known as Comandante Moisés (Commander Moisés), is a Brazilian politician who was the governor of Santa Catarina, having won the 2018 election in the state of Santa Catarina against Gelson Merisio. He lost re-election in 2022 to Jorginho Mello, not advancing into the second round.

Political offices
Preceded by Eduardo Pinho Moreira	Governor of Santa Catarina; 2019–2023	Succeeded by Jorginho Mello
