= Helena Amélia Oehler Stemmer =

Brazilian civil engineer

- Born: 11 November 1927; Porto Alegre
- Died: March 28, 2016 (aged 88); Florianópolis
- Education: Universidade Federal do Rio Grande do Sul
- Occupation: Civil Engineer

Helena Amélia Oehler Stemmer (11 November 1927 – 28 March 2016) was a Brazilian civil engineer and university professor.

== Early life and education ==
Helena Amélia Oehler was born in Porto Alegre on 11 November 1927 to Marcella Elisa Pierina Sanguin and Rodolpho Carlos Oehler.

She graduated in civil engineering at the Universidade Federal do Rio Grande do Sul (UFRGS) in 1954.

== Career ==
On 15 May 1955, Helena Amélia Oehler married her university colleague Caspar Erich Stemmer and soon got a job at the company Azevedo Bastian Castilhos S / A Construções.

When her husband Caspar, then dean of Universidade Federal de Santa Catarina (UFSC) made a study exchange trip to the Technical University of North Rhine-Westphalia in Aachen (RWTH Aachen) in Germany, Helena Stemmer attended structural analysis classes in German at the university.

Stemmer started teaching at UFSC in 1969, a year after the foundation of the civil engineering course, becoming the first teacher in the discipline of construction stability at the university. She was coordinator of the civil engineering course, head of department and director of the Technological Center (CTC).

She was the only woman to head an engineering department at CTC in almost 50 years.

She dedicated herself to teaching for almost three decades until her retirement in June 1992, and co-authored the book Memórias da Engenharia Civil.

== Personal life ==
In her youth, she practiced athletics at the Porto Alegre Gymnastics Society. Later in life, she was known for her interest and knowledge of opera, and sang as a soprano. She was celebrated for her good memory, enthusiasm for reading and broad cultural interests.

On 15 May 1955, Helena Amélia Oehler Stemmer married her university colleague Caspar Erich Stemmer. They had three children, Gaspar, Marcelo and Miriam.

== Death and burial ==
Helena Amélia Oehler Stemmer died around noon on Monday, 28 March 2016. She was buried in the Jardim da Paz Cemetery in Florianópolis alongside her husband.
