= Décio Lima =

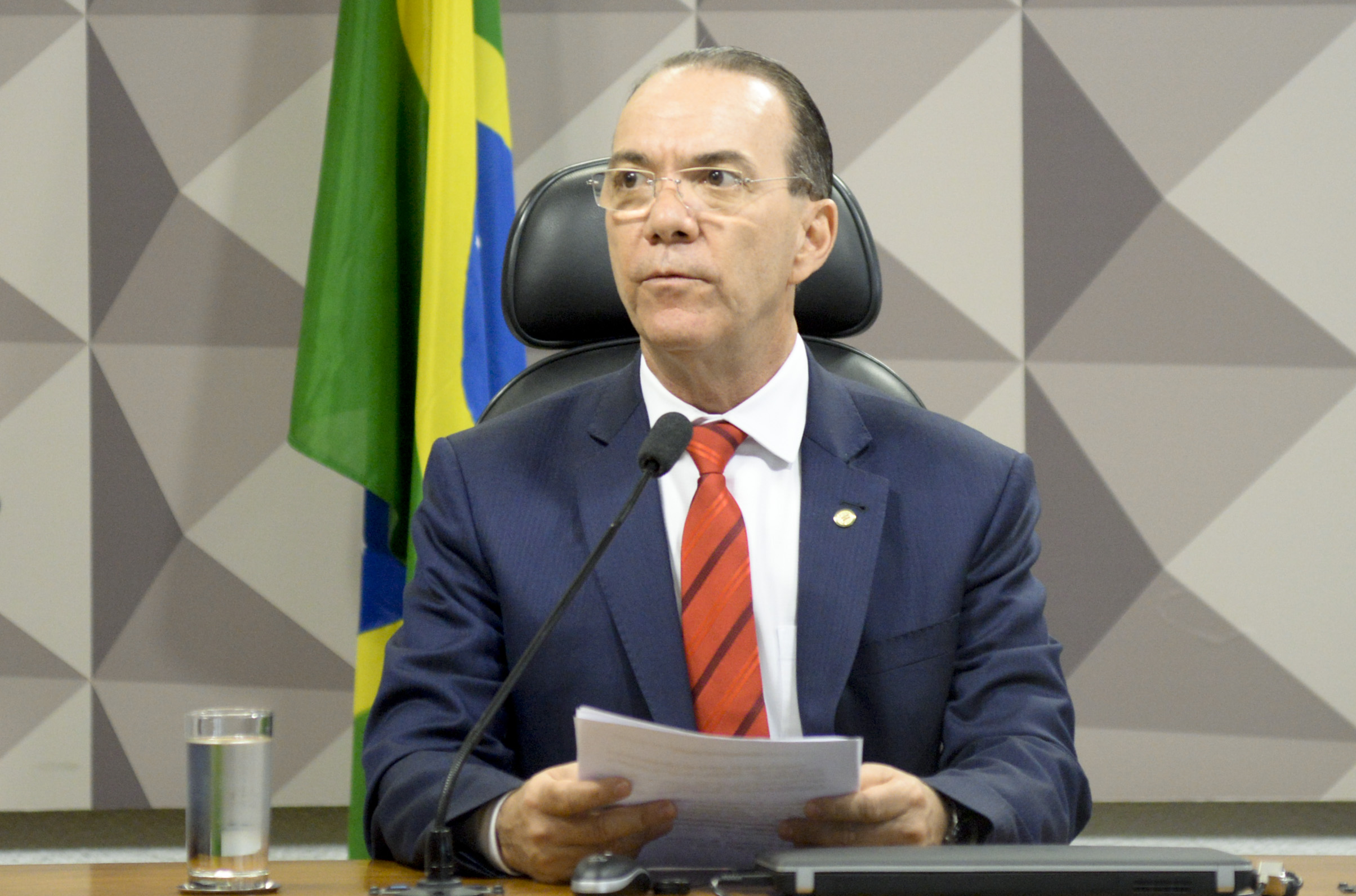

Director-president of Sebrae
- Incumbent
- Assumed office 10 April 2023
- Preceded by: Carlos Melles

Federal deputy for Santa Catarina
- In office 1 February 2007 – 1 February 2019

Mayor of Blumenau
- In office 1 January 1997 – 1 January 2005
- Preceded by: Renato de Mello Vianna
- Succeeded by: João Paulo Kleinübing

Councilman of Blumenau
- In office 1 January 1993 – 1 January 1997

Personal details
- Born: Décio Nery de Lima; 1 October 1960 (age 65) Itajaí, Santa Catarina, Brazil
- Political party: PT (1981–present)
- Spouse: Ana Paula Lima

Décio Nery de Lima (born 1 October 1960) is a Brazilian professor, lawyer, and politician. He is currently the president of Sebrae. Prior to assuming the presidency, he was a federal deputy from the state of Santa Catarina, as well as the mayor of Blumenau. He was affiliated with the Workers' Party (PT).

== Biography ==
Lima was born in 1960 in Itajaí, Santa Catarina, the son of Nery Adolfo Lima and Angelina Adriano Lima. He attended local schools in Itajaí.

Licensed in social sciences from the Geoeducational Teaching Center Foundation of the Vale do Itajaí (Fepevi) in 1984, he graduated with a bachelors in law from the University of the Valley of Itajaí (UNIVALI) in 1989. Since his graduation, he has been actively involved with students' movements, becoming the vice-president of the Philosophy Student's Academic Directory, and president of the Law Student's Academic Directory and the Students' Union of Santa Catarina (UCE). In 1989 also, he began work as a labor union lawyer, which he practiced until 1996.

Lima is married to federal deputy Ana Paula Lima (PT), with whom he has two children.

== Political career ==
Lima began his political career after he joined the PT in 1981 and became a city councillor in the city of Blumenau from 1993 to 1996. In 1997, he became the mayor, serving until 2005 and becoming known mainly for his social inclusion programs and urban modernization.

From 2005 to 2006, he was the superintendent of the Port of Itajaí, one of the most important shipping ports in Brazil, being responsible for overseeing the largest number of investments into the port in its history.

He was elected a federal deputy from Santa Catarina, and for the PT, for the first time in 2007, a position he kept until 2019.

In 2012, he coordinated the Catarinense Parliamentary Front, and, in 2013, he became the first person from Santa Catarina to preside over the Commission on the Constitution, Justice, and Citizenship (CCJC), a period in which he built a horizontal power structure that considered all parties and gave agility to themes of national interest in the commissions' process.

He is the current president of the state branch of the PT in Santa Catarina, having been a member of the party since its inception. He was in fact the second person in the state to become affiliated with the party and contributed to organization efforts in the state. He is also the vice-leader of the PT bench in the Chamber of Deputies, and was a member of seven commissions, among them the CCJC and the work group to evaluate the proposals to the Military Penal Code. As a condition of the substitute picks, Lima also became a member of the Science and Technology and Communication and Informatics Commission (CCTCI), the Special Commission assigned to analyze the Constitutional Amendment about Public Security (CESEGUR) and the Special Subcommission of Publicity and Propaganda (SUBPUBLI).

In 2017, Lima became a leader of the opposition in the National Congress, leading debates with the PT, Communist Party of Brazil (PCdoB), Democratic Labour Party (PDT), and Sustainability Network (REDE), most notably taking on the Bolsonaro administration proposals on social and workers' rights.

Along with that, in 2018, he became a gubernatorial candidate as part of the PT, but only came in fourth place, not advancing to the second round. In 2022, he ran again for governor, advancing to the second round, but only garnering 29.31% of the vote against Jorginho Mello.

In 2023, he became the president of Sebrae.

== Electoral history ==
| Year | Election | Party | Office | Coalition | Partner | Party | Votes | Results |
|---|---|---|---|---|---|---|---|---|
| 1992 | Blumenau Municipal elections | PT | Councilman | N/A | | | 1,812 | Won |
| 1996 | Blumenau Municipal elections | PT | Mayor | N/A | | | 68,951 | Won |
| 2000 | Blumenau Municipal elections | PT | Mayor | N/A | | | 90,805 | Won |
| 2006 | Santa Catarina State Elections | PT | Federal Deputy | N/A | | | 102,112 | Won |
| 2008 | Blumenau Municipal elections | PT | Mayor | N/A | | | 48,754 | Lost |
| 2010 | Santa Catarina State Elections | PT | Federal Deputy | In Favor of Santa Catarina PRB, PT, PR, PSDC, PRTB, PHS, PSB and PCdoB | N/A | | 117,618 | Won |
| 2014 | Santa Catarina State Elections | PT | Federal Deputy | N/A | | | 112,366 | Won |
| 2018 | Santa Catarina State Elections | PT | Governor | N/A | Alcimar Oliveira | PT | 460,889 | Lost |
| 2022 | Santa Catarina State Elections | PT | Governor | Democratic Front of Santa Catarina PT, PCdoB, PV, Solidariedade and PSB | Bia Vargas | PSB | 1st: 710,859 | Lost |
| 2022 | Santa Catarina State Elections | PT | Governor | Democratic Front of Santa Catarina PT, PCdoB, PV, Solidariedade and PSB | Bia Vargas | PSB | 2nd: 1,237,016 | Lost |

== Bibliography ==
- Agência PT de Notícias (2017). "Décio Lima: 6º Congresso representa um novo PT".
- Agência PT de Notícias (2018). "Ana Paula Lima (SC) entra para a Câmara e aumenta Bancada do PT".
- Câmara dos Deputados (2019). "Décio Lima - Biografia".
- CCJC - Câmara dos Deputados (2019). "COMISSÃO DE CONSTITUIÇÃO E JUSTIÇA E DE CIDADANIA - Presidente".
- Coloniese, Carla (2013). "Novo presidente da CCJC na Câmara Federal, Décio Lima recebe cumprimentos do Parlamento Catarinense". Agência AL.
- Eleições 2014 (2014). "Décio Lima 1313".
- FGV (2008). "Verbete".
- G1 SC (2013). "Décio Lima assume Comissão da Câmara dos Deputados, em Brasília".
- Gazeta do Povo (2018). "Eleições 2018 - Resultados".
- Gonçalves, Alexandre (2017). "Décio Lima assume a liderança da oposição no Congresso Nacional". Informe Blumenau.
- Memória Política de Santa Catarina (2019). "Décio Lima".
- PT Santa Catarina (2018). "Décio Lima é o candidato ao governo pelo PT Santa Catarina".
