= Sebrae =

Brazilian autonomous social institution

Serviço Brasileiro de Apoio às Micro e Pequenas Empresas
- Abbreviation: Sebrae
- Formation: 7 May 1972
- Location: Brasília, Brazil
- Coordinates: 15.816°S 47.8882°W
- Chairman: Décio Lima
- Website: www.sebrae.com.br

Sebrae (Portuguese: Serviço Brasileiro de Apoio às Micro e Pequenas Empresas, "Support Service for Micro and Small Enterprises"), is a Brazilian autonomous social institution part of the Sistema S whose aim is to foster the development of micro and small enterprises, stimulating entrepreneurship in the country.

Founded in 1972 with the name of Cebrae (Centro Brasileiro de Apoio à Pequena e Média Empresa), it was an entity associated with the Brazilian federal government. In October 1990, it was renamed Sebrae (Serviço Brasileiro de apoio às Micro e Pequenas Empresas), detaching itself from public administration and becoming an autonomous, non-profit social service.

Sebrae's chairman is, as of 2023, Décio Lima. The president of its National Deliberative Council is José Zeferino Pedrozo.
