= Federal University of Santa Catarina =

University in Florianópolis, Brazil

Coordinates: 27°36′04″S 48°31′12″W

- Universidade Federal de Santa Catarina
- Other name: UFSC
- Motto: Ars et Scientia
- Motto in English: Arts and Science
- Type: Public
- Established: 1960
- Rector: Irineu Manoel de Souza
- Administrative staff: 4,539
- Undergraduates: 29,595
- Postgraduates: 14,233
- Location: Florianópolis, Santa Catarina, Brazil
- Campus: Urban
- Website: www.ufsc.br

The Federal University of Santa Catarina (Portuguese: Universidade Federal de Santa Catarina, UFSC) is a public university in Florianópolis, the capital city of Santa Catarina in southern Brazil.

The structure of its campus comprises 11 Academic Schools (Centros de Ensino), divided by field of study. Every School is divided in departments, the largest one being the Department of Mechanical Engineering. The oldest school at UFSC is the School of Law. The Department of Law was the first of UFSC's departments to be officially recognized in 1932.

== History ==
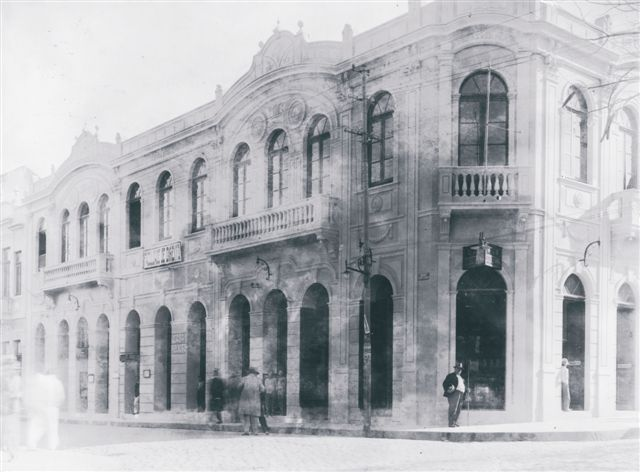
First installation of the Law school

The history of the Federal University of Santa Catarina has its roots in the Polytechnic Institute of Florianópolis founded on 13 March of 1917 by José Arthur Boiteux. Organized as a free institute, it was the first college degree institution of Santa Catarina state. On 11 February 1932 the Law School was incorporated, officially in 1935.

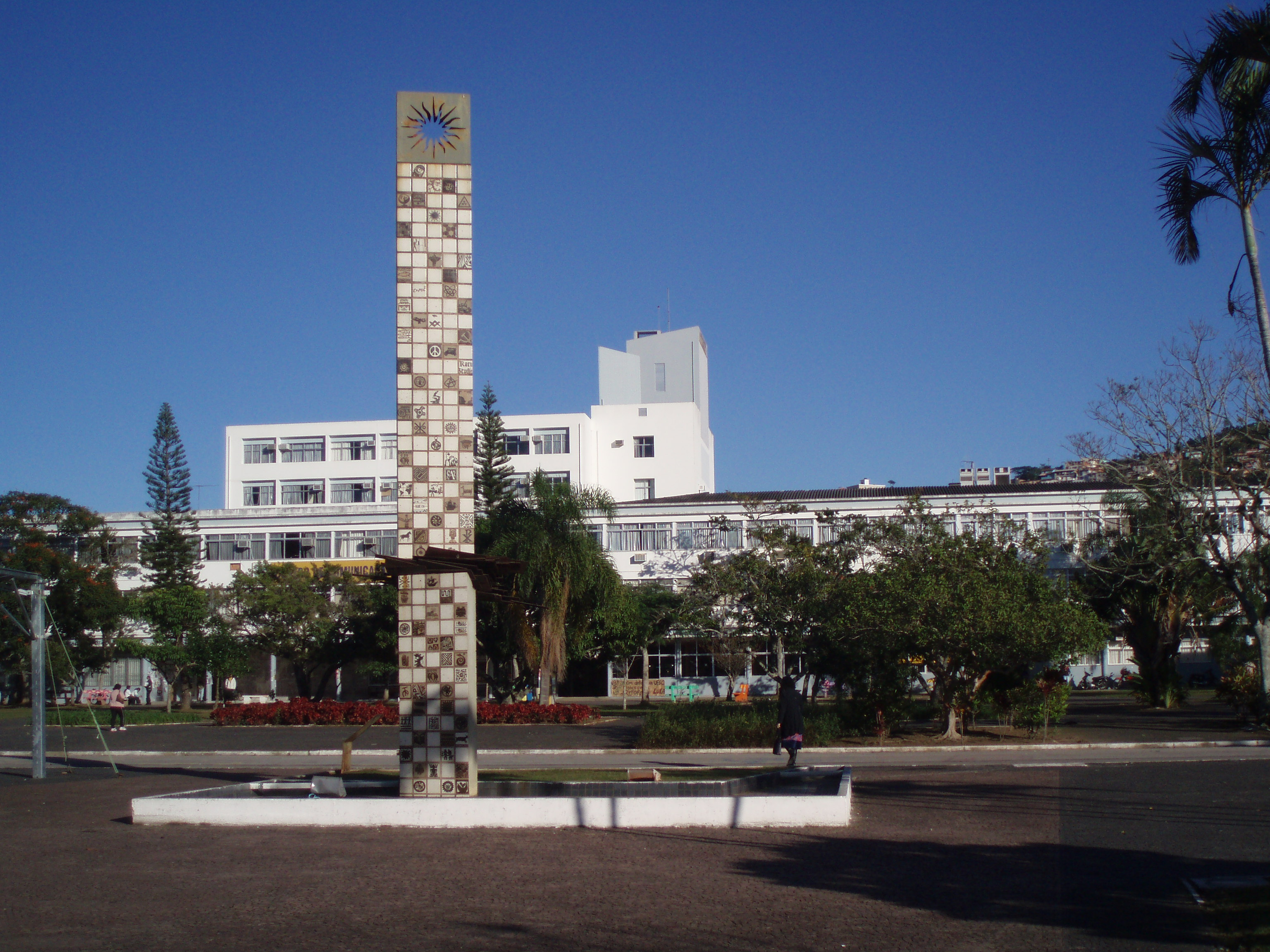
View over the central square of the main campus

That triggered a movement to start the first state university and on 18 December, of 1960 it became the University of Santa Catarina, offering the courses of Law, Medicine, Pharmacy, Philosophy, Economics, Social Service and the School of Industrial Engineering. On 15 July 1968, as an effort of the Brazilian government to improve college education in Brazil with education reform, the major universities in Brazil were reorganized in Schools and Departments and acquired a new education structure, more resembling the American and English methodology. Since then the university became the Federal University of Santa Catarina.

In 1961 the institution earned a new place in the city to build its structure, located in the region of Trindade near downtown Florianópolis. The area was previously occupied by a model farm called Assis-Brasil and is located near the coast, having several streams crossing the actual campus. The moving was finished in 1980.

A young university, the Federal University of Santa Catarina continues to grow. During the 1980s, it began to invest heavily in the expansion of graduate programs and research, besides supporting the creation of technology centers in the state of Santa Catarina and the development of a number of outreach projects for the community. Today, UFSC has four other campuses distributed in the cities of Araranguá, Blumenau, Curitibanos and Joinville.

== Admissions ==
The Universidade Federal de Santa Catarina undergraduate admission process is almost similar to all others in Brazil, using a process called vestibular. It is comprised by several written tests usually performed in 2–3 days. The competition is fierce and the percentage of successful applicants is usually lower than 15% (12,6% in 2018's process).

The admission process for graduate school is more complex and usually involves a test and a recommendation from the previous college. People interested in graduate degrees at UFSC should contact the department of the intended program directly. The Brazilian Ministry of Education, through CAPES (Coordenação de Aperfeiçoamento de Pessoal do Nível Superior, Superior Level Personnel Enhancement Coordination) evaluates graduate programs in Brazil every three years, ranking them from 1 (worst) to 7, being 6 excellence and 7 international excellence level.

The following graduate programs at UFSC have received grades 6 or 7, as per the last CAPES evaluation (2013):

- Aquaculture
- Chemical Engineering
- Chemistry
- Civil Engineering
- Electrical Engineering
- Food Engineering
- Food Science
- Interdisciplinary Studies in Human Sciences
- Law
- Linguistics
- Mechanical Engineering
- Materials Science and Engineering
- Nursing
- Plant Genetic Resources
- Pharmacology
- Philosophy
- Scientific and Technological Education

== Numbers ==
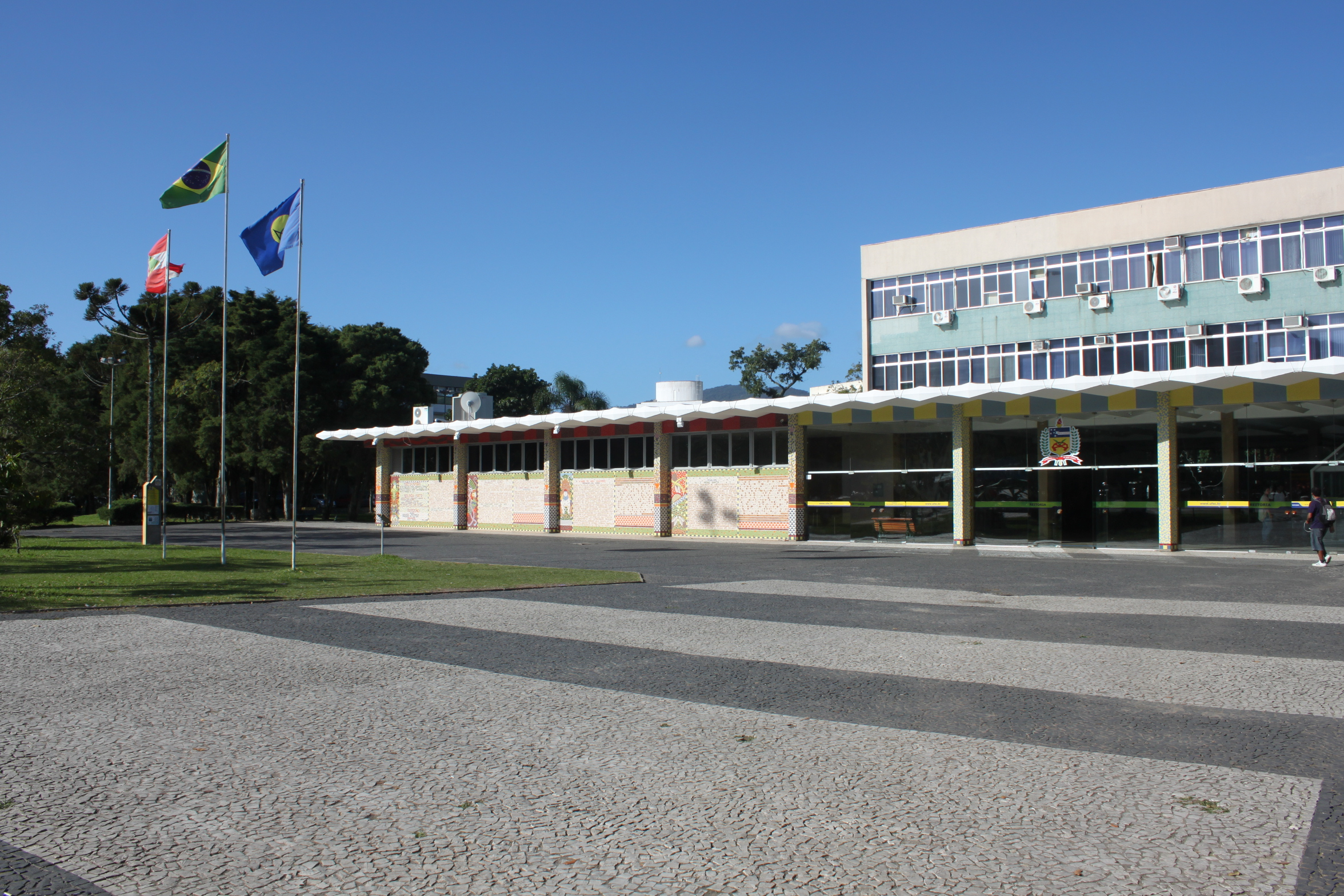
Rectory of the University.

2016 numbers, provided by the institution.

- 119 undergraduate programs;
- 82 Master's degree programs;
- 55 Doctoral degree programs;
- 45,006 students (total);
- 2,670 professors;
- 3,242 administrative staff.

== Academic schools ==
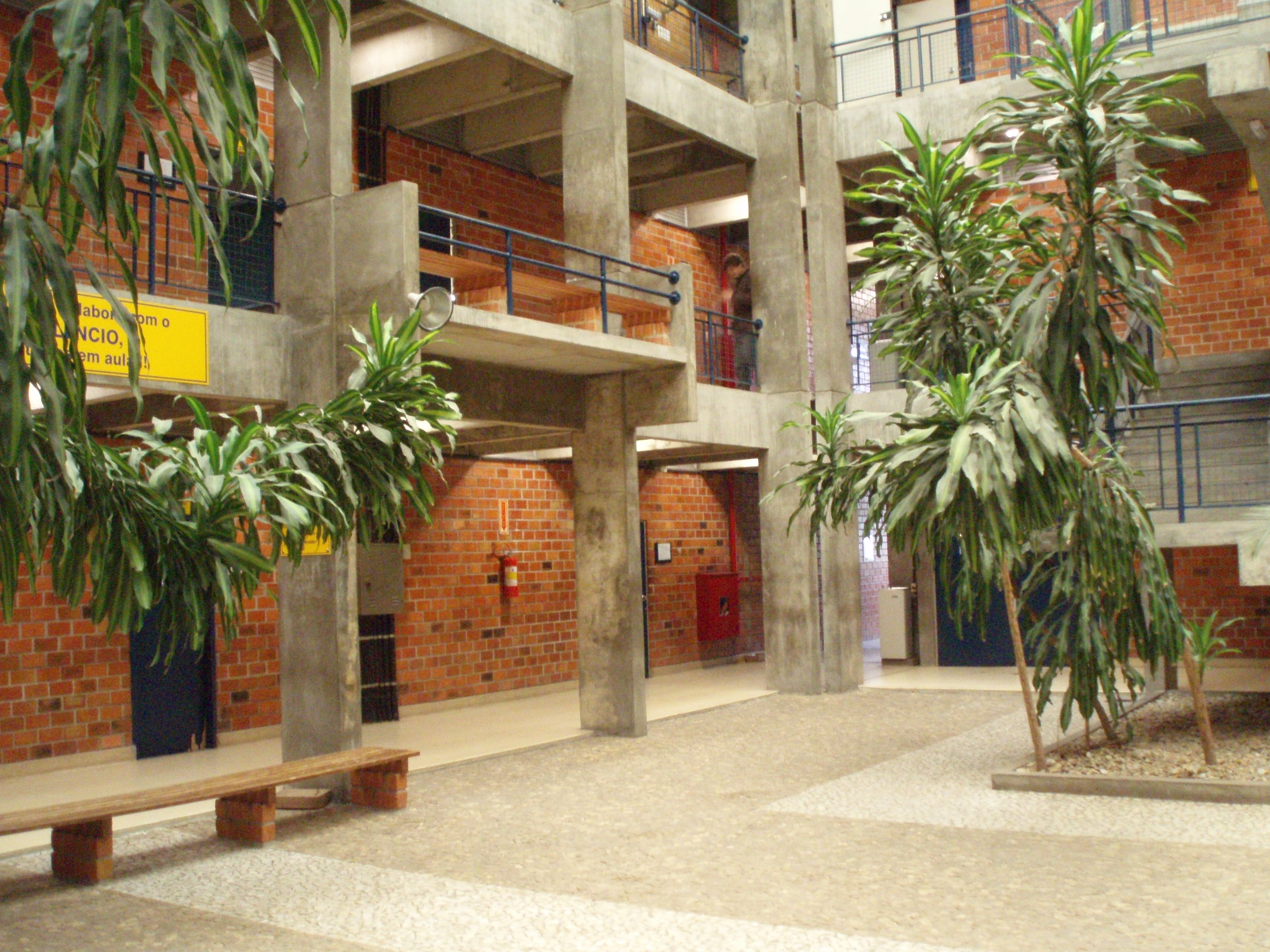
School of Technology (CTC)

- School of Agricultural Sciences – CCA
- School of Biological Sciences – CCB
- School of Communication and Arts – CCE
- School of Education – CED
- School of Health Sciences – CCS
- School of Law – CCJ
- School of Philosophy and Human Sciences – CFH
- School of Physical and Mathematical Sciences – CFM
- School of Sports – CDS
- School of Socio-Economic Sciences – CSE
- School of Technology – CTC

== Notable faculty ==
- Helena Amélia Oehler Stemmer – civil engineer

== Notable alumni ==
- Dário Berger, senator and former mayor of Florianópolis
- Esperidião Amin, former governor of Santa Catarina
- Luiz Henrique da Silveira, former governor of Santa Catarina
- Michel Doukeris, CEO of AB InBev
- João Nílson Zunino, former president of Avaí FC and pathologist

== Rankings and reputation ==
University rankings

Global – Overall
- QS World: 751-800 (2019)
- THE World: 801–1000 (2019)
- USNWR Global: 597 (2019)

== See also ==
- Brazil University Rankings
- List of federal universities of Brazil
- Universities and Higher Education in Brazil
