= Marilisa Boehm =

Brazilian politician (born 1964)

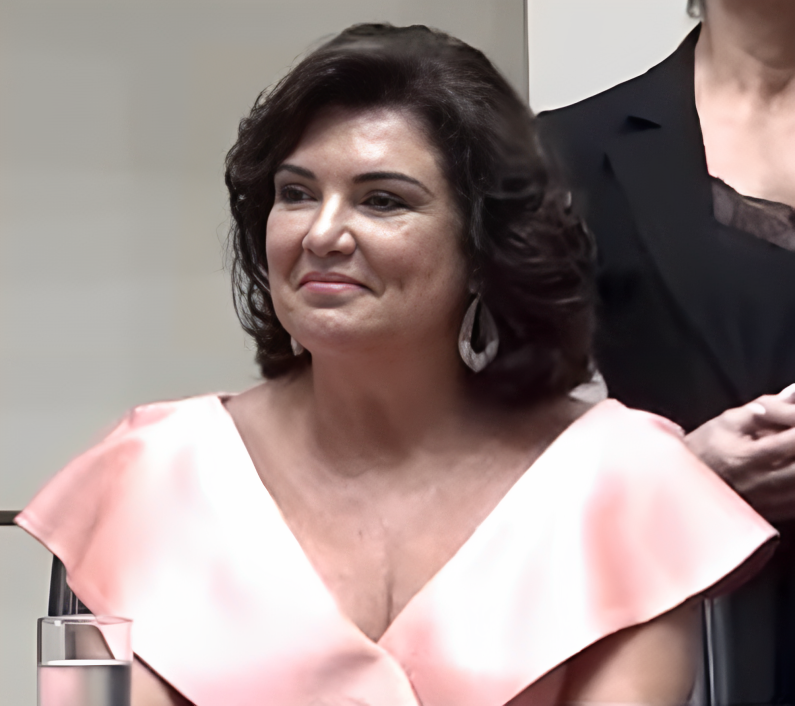
- Boehm in 2023

Vice Governor of Santa Catarina
- Incumbent
- Assumed office 1 January 2023
- Governor: Jorginho Mello
- Preceded by: Daniela Reinehr

Personal details
- Born: 16 December 1964 (age 61)
- Party: Liberal Party (since 2022)

Marilisa Boehm (born 16 December 1964) is a Brazilian politician serving as vice governor of Santa Catarina since 2023. From 1990 to 2014, she was the head of the women's police station of Joinville.
