= Ana Caroline Campagnolo =

Brazilian politician

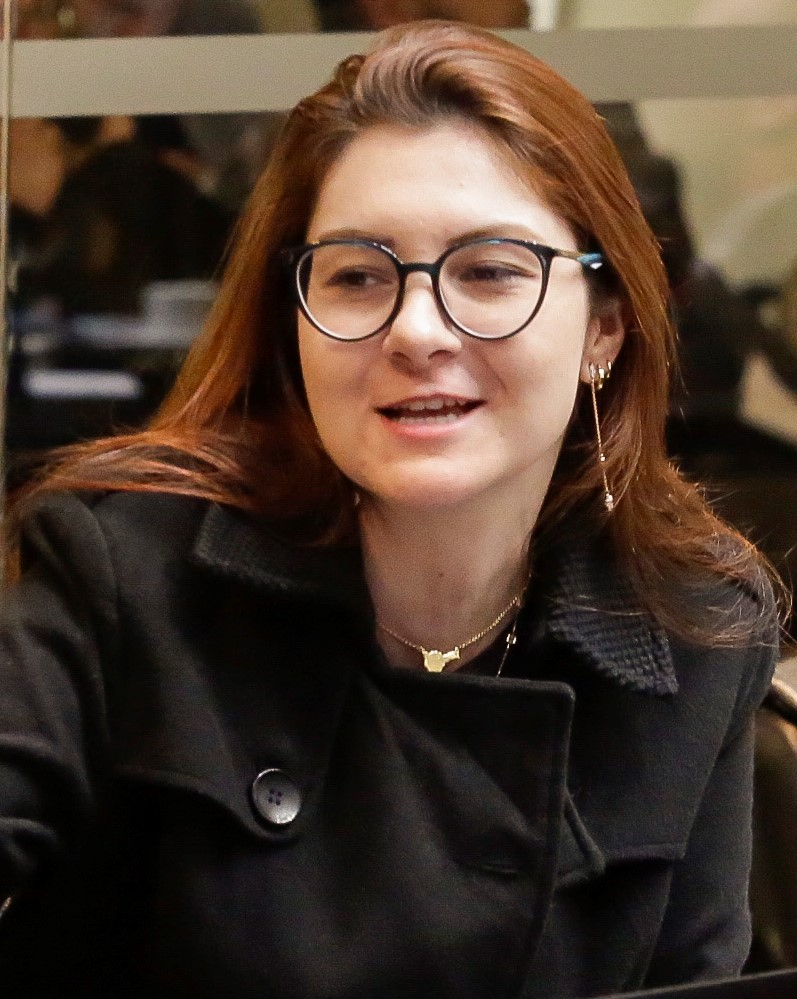
- Campagnolo in 2019

State Deputy of Santa Catarina
- Incumbent
- Assumed office 1 February 2019

Personal details
- Born: Ana Caroline Campagnolo; 26 November 1990 (age 35) Itajaí, Santa Catarina, Brazil
- Party: PL (since 2022)
- Other political affiliations: PP (2014–2018); PSL (2018–2022); UNIÃO (2022) }}
- Spouse: Thiago Lívio Quintairos Galvão (m. 2019)
- Children: Catarina Campagnolo Galvão; Joana Campagnolo Galvão
- Education: Santa Catarina State University
- Occupation: Politician; writer; historian

Ana Caroline Campagnolo Galvão (born 26 November 1990) is a Brazilian politician, writer and historian.

== Background ==
She was a history teacher in schools in Itajaí, in the coast of Santa Catarina state. She graduated from Chapecó Community College. She refers to her family as being “conservative and religious, but never opposed to studying ideologies other than their own”. A Christian, Campagnolo describes herself as antifeminist.

In the 2018 elections she was elected a state deputy of Santa Catarina, for the Social Liberal Party (PSL).

In 2019 she published the book Feminism: Perversion and Subversion.

== Controversies ==
=== Allegations of inciting persecution against teachers ===
In October 2018 she created a WhatsApp channel for students to, according to her, “film or record any party-political or ideological expressions that humiliate or offend [their] freedom of faith and conscience” made by school teachers, adding to fears in the international press of widespread ideological persecution in Brazil following the election of far-right president Jair Bolsonaro. On 29 October, the Brazilian Public Prosecutor's Office opened an investigation into alleged harassment of state teachers by Campagnolo.

=== Statement against journalists ===
After being questioned by the press about allegedly using money provided to her by the State Assembly to attend the launches of her own book, Campagnolo called journalists "scoundrels". She also questioned whether they "have cognitive problems".

These remarks were followed by a significant backlash from the journalist community. It prompted journalists' organizations to file charges against her on the State Assembly Ethics Board.

=== Old tweets ===
In 2019, old tweets from 2012 (when Campagnolo was at the age of 21) resurfaced. Back then she published a series of posts about being under the influence of marijuana and in favor of the drug. She also tweeted about being an "adulterer" and an "alcoholic" as well as being a prescription drug user. In another tweet, she implied using pages of the Bible as a rolling paper for drug use. After the tweets gained widespread attention on social media, Campagnolo deleted her account.

She later dismissed claims that she was a cannabis user describing her past tweets as "irony". She explained that she was in nursing school at the time and that joking about psychoactive substances was common among her colleagues.
