= Jorge Seif =

Brazilian politician (born 1977)

- Official portrait

Senator for Santa Catarina
- Incumbent
- Assumed office 1 February 2023

Personal details
- Born: 10 May 1977 (age 49)
- Party: Liberal Party (since 2020)

Jorge Seif Júnior (born 10 May 1977) is a Brazilian politician serving as a member of the Federal Senate since 2023. From 2019 to 2022, he served as national secretary of fishing and aquaculture. He is of Syrian-Lebanese descent.
