= Alberto Fraga =

Brazilian colonel and politician

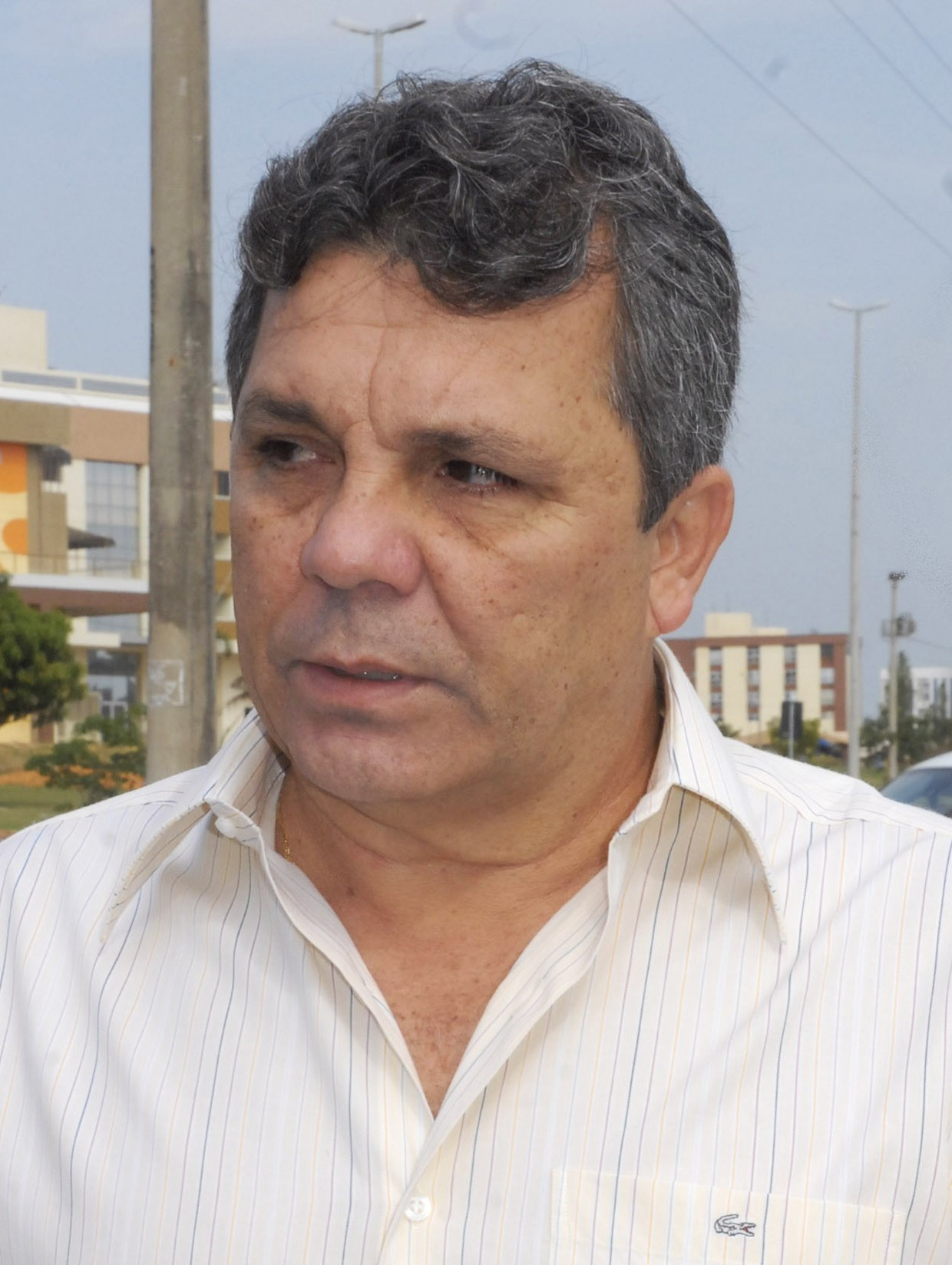
- Portrait of Alberto Fraga

Federal Deputy for Distrito Federal

Federal Deputy for Distrito Federal
- Incumbent
- Assumed office February 1, 2015
- In office January 23, 1999 – January 31, 2011

Personal details
- Born: June 2, 1956 (age 70) Estância, Sergipe, Brazil
- Party: DEM (2007–2022); PL (2022-incumbent)
- Occupation: Police officer

João Alberto Fraga Silva (born Estância, June 2, 1956) is a Brazilian retired colonel of the Military Police in Federal District the capital of Brazil and politician.

He has been a member of the Chamber of Deputies from 1999 until 2011. In 2022 he affiliated with the Liberal Party.
