= Ibicaré =

Coordinates: 27°07′S 51°24′W

- Municipality
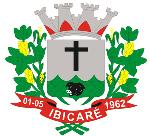
- Flag Coat of arms
- Interactive map of Ibicaré
- Country: Brazil
- Region: South
- State: Santa Catarina
- Mesoregion: Oeste Catarinense

Population (2020)
  - Total: 3,178
- Time zone: UTC -3

Ibicaré is a municipality in the state of Santa Catarina in the South region of Brazil.

== See also ==
- List of municipalities in Santa Catarina
