= Dário Berger =

Brazilian politician

Senator for Santa Catarina
- In office February 1, 2015 – February 1, 2023

48th Mayor of Florianópolis
- In office January 1, 2005 – January 1, 2013
- Preceded by: Ângela Amin
- Succeeded by: César Souza Júnior

Mayor of São José
- In office January 1, 1997 – January 1, 2005
- Preceded by: Gervásio Silva
- Succeeded by: Vanildo Macedo

Personal details
- Born: December 7, 1956 (age 69) Bom Retiro, Santa Catarina, Brazil
- Party: PSB (2022–present)
- Other political affiliations: PFL (1991–2003); PSDB (2003–07); MDB (2007–22)
- Education: Federal University of Santa Catarina (BBA)
- Profession: Businessman
- Website: darioberger.com.br

Dário Berger (born December 7, 1956) is a Brazilian politician. He has represented Santa Catarina in the Federal Senate since 2015. Previously, he was mayor of Florianópolis from 2005 to 2012. He is a member of the Brazilian Democratic Movement Party.

Berger has been repeatedly accused of corruption. While mayor of São José, Santa Catarina he was fined for several financial irregularities during the construction of a highway. He also faced criticism when he awarded South Stage Events LTDA a contract to build a big Christmas tree in the center of São Jose without a fair bidding process. Despite this, he was part of a Senate committee to investigate President Dilma Rousseff’s alleged tampering of fiscal data.

== See also ==
- List of mayors of Florianópolis

Political offices
Preceded by Gervásio Silva	Mayor of São José; 1997–2005	Succeeded by Vanildo Macedo
Preceded by Ângela Amin	Mayor of Florianópolis; 2005–2013	Succeeded by César Souza Júnior
