= Dalirio Beber =

Brazilian politician

Dalírio Beber
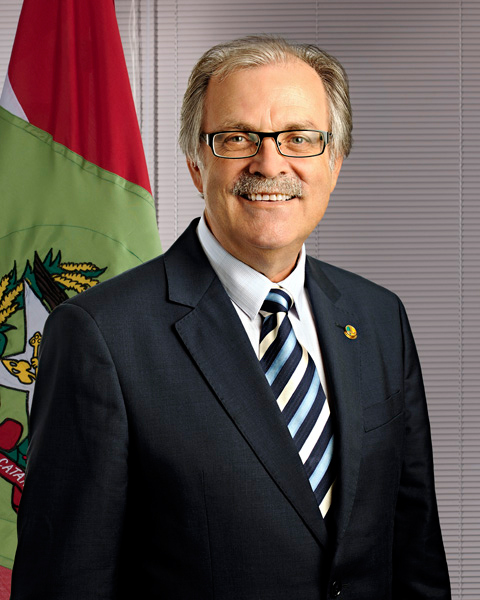

Senator for Santa Catarina
- In office May 19, 2015 – February 1, 2019

Personal details
- Born: Dalírio José Beber; April 16, 1949 (age 76); Massaranduba, Santa Catarina
- Political party: PSDB (1988–present)
- Profession: Lawyer

Dalírio José Beber (born April 16, 1949) is a Brazilian politician. He has represented Santa Catarina in the Federal Senate from 2015 to 2019. He is a member of the Brazilian Social Democracy Party.
