= Gelson Merisio =

Brazilian politician (born 1966)

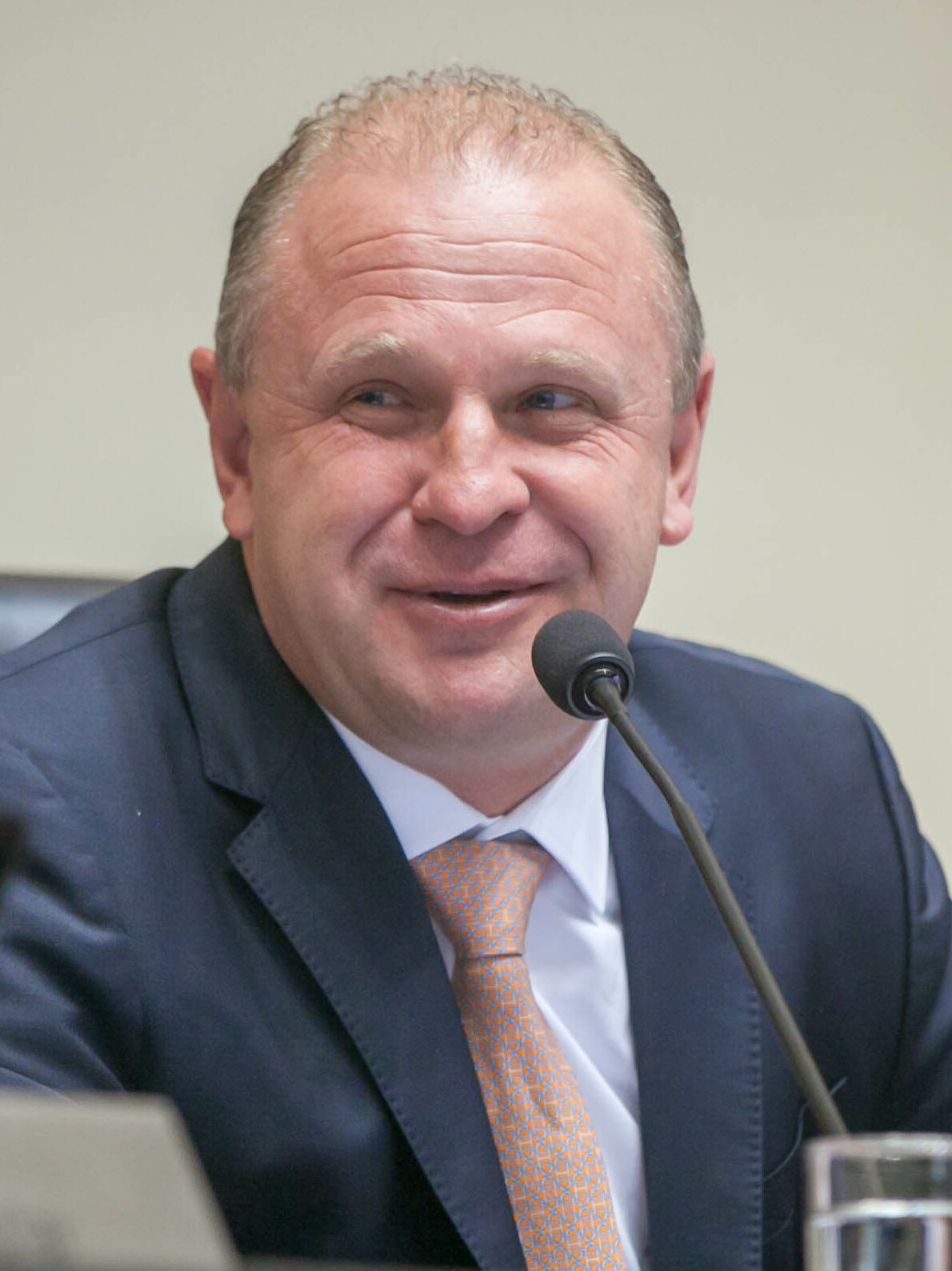
- Merisio in 2017

Member of the Legislative Assembly of Santa Catarina
- In office 1 February 2005 – 31 January 2019

Personal details
- Born: 31 January 1966 (age 60)
- Party: Solidarity (since 2022)

Gelson Luiz Merisio (born 31 January 1966) is a Brazilian politician. From 2005 to 2019, he was a member of the Legislative Assembly of Santa Catarina. He served as president of the Assembly from 2010 to 2012 and from 2015 to 2016.
