= Raimundo Colombo =

Brazilian politician

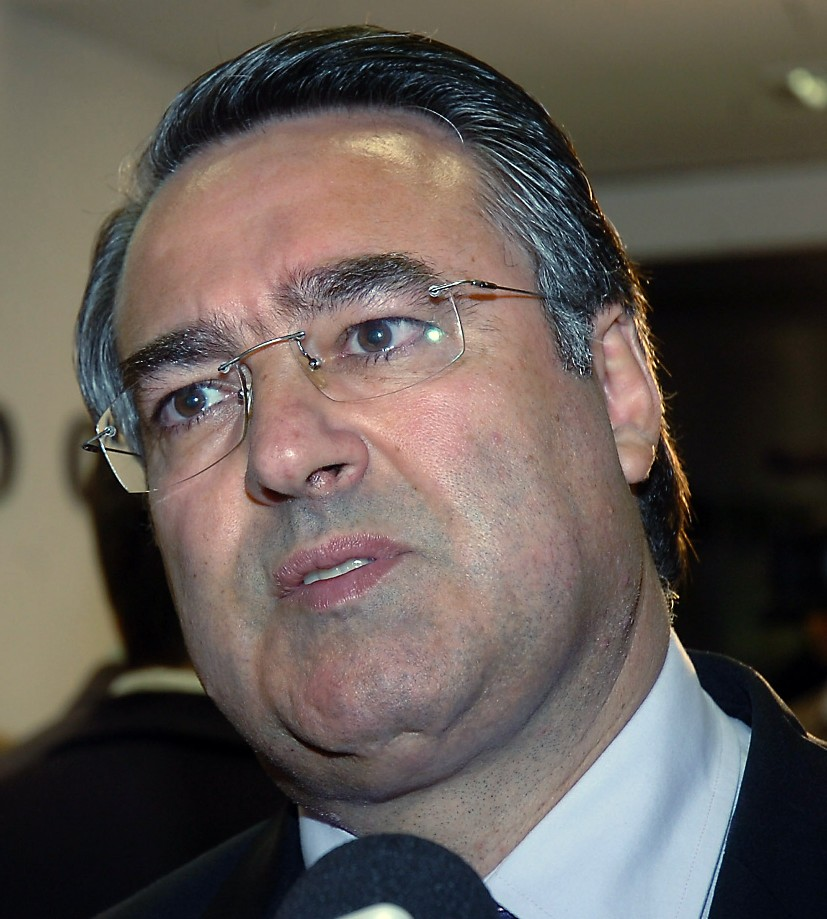

Governor of Santa Catarina
- In office January 1, 2011 – April 5, 2018
- Preceded by: Leonel Pavan
- Succeeded by: Eduardo Pinho Moreira

Personal details
- Born: February 28, 1955 (age 71) Lages, Santa Catarina
- Party: Social Democratic Party

João Raimundo Colombo (born February 28, 1955 Lages, Santa Catarina) is a Brazilian politician and member of the Social Democratic Party (PSD). He served as the governor of the southern Brazilian state of Santa Catarina from January 1, 2011, to April 5, 2018.

Political offices
| Preceded by Leonel Pavan | Governor of Santa Catarina; 2011–2018 | Succeeded by Eduardo Pinho Moreira |
