= 1979 in Brazil =

Events in the year 1979 in Brazil.

== Incumbents ==
=== Federal government ===
- President:
  - General Ernesto Geisel (until 14 March)
  - General João Figueiredo (starting 15 March)
- Vice President:
  - General Adalberto Pereira dos Santos (until 14 March)
  - Aureliano Chaves (starting 15 March)

=== Governors ===
- Acre:
  - Geraldo Mesquita (until 15 March)
  - Joaquim Macedo (from 15 March)
- Alagoas:
  - Geraldo Mello (until 15 March)
  - Guilherme Palmeira (from 15 March)
- Amazonas:
  - Henoch da Silva Reis (until 15 March)
  - José Bernardino Lindoso (from 15 March)
- Bahia:
  - Roberto Santos (until 15 March)
  - Antônio Carlos Magalhães (from 15 March)
- Ceará:
  - Waldemar Alcântara (until 15 March)
  - Virgílio Távora (from 15 March)
- Espírito Santo:
  - Élcio Álvares (until 15 March)
  - Eurico Vieira Resende (from 15 March)
- Goiás:
  - Irapuan Costa Jr. (until 15 March)
  - Ary Valadão (from 15 March)
- Maranhão:
  - Oswaldo da Costa Nunes Freire (until 15 March)
  - João Castelo (from 15 March)
- Mato Grosso:
  - Cássio Leite de Barros (until 15 March)
  - Frederico Campos (from 15 March)
- Mato Grosso do Sul:
  - Harry Amorim Costa (until 12 June)
  - Londres Machado (12 June-30 June)
  - Marcelo Miranda Soares (from 30 June)
- Minas Gerais:
  - Levindo Ozanan Coelho (until 15 March)
  - Francelino Pereira (from 15 March)
- Pará:
  - Clóvis Rego (until 15 March)
  - Alacid Nunes (from 15 March)
- Paraíba:
  - Dorgival Terceiro Neto (until 15 March)
  - Tarcísio Burity (from 15 March)
- Paraná:
  - Jaime Canet Júnior (until 15 March)
  - Nei Braga (from 15 March)
- Pernambuco:
  - Francisco Moura Cavalcanti (until 15 March)
  - Marco Maciel (from 15 March)
- Piauí:
  - Djalma Veloso (until 15 March)
  - Lucídio Portela (from 15 March)
- Rio de Janeiro:
  - Floriano P. Faria Lima (until 15 March)
  - Antônio Chagas Freitas (from 15 March)
- Rio Grande do Norte:
  - Tarcisio de Vasconcelos Maia (until 15 March)
  - Lavoisier Maia (from 1rio 5 March)
- Rio Grande do Sul:
  - Sinval Sebastião Duarte Guazzelli (until 15 March)
  - José Augusto Amaral de Souza (from 15 March)
- Santa Catarina:
  - Antônio Carlos Konder Reis (until 15 March)
  - Jorge Bornhausen (from 15 March)
- São Paulo:
  - Paulo Egídio Martins (until 15 March)
  - Paulo Maluf (from 15 March)
- Sergipe:
  - José Rollemberg (until 15 March)
  - Augusto Franco (from 15 March)

=== Vice governors ===
- Acre:
  - Omar Sabino de Paula (until 15 March)
  - José Fernandes Rego (from 15 March)
- Alagoas:
  - Antônio Guedes Amaral (until 15 March)
  - Teobaldo Vasconcelos Barbosa (from 15 March)
- Amazonas:
  - João Bosco Ramos de Lima (until 15 March)
  - Paulo Pinto Nery (from 15 March)
- Bahia:
  - Edvaldo Brandão Correia (until 15 March)
  - Luis Viana Neto (from 15 March)
- Ceará:
  - José Waldemar de Alcântara e Silva (until 15 March)
  - Manuel de Castro Filho (from 15 March)
- Espírito Santo:
  - Carlos Alberto Lindenberg von Schilgen (until 15 March)
  - José Carlos Fonseca (from 15 March)
- Goiás:
  - José Luís Bittencourt (until 15 March)
  - Rui Brasil Cavalcanti (from 15 March)
- Maranhão:
  - José Duailibe Murad (until 15 March)
  - Artur Teixeira de Carvalho (from 15 March)
- Mato Grosso:
  - Cássio Leite de Barros (until 15 March)
  - José Vilanova Torres (from 15 March)
- Mato Grosso do Sul: Vacant
- Minas Gerais:
  - Levindo Ozanam Coelho (until 15 March)
  - João Marques de Vasconcelos (from 15 March)
- Pará: Gerson dos Santos Peres (from 15 March)
- Paraíba: Clóvis Cavalcanti (from 15 March)
- Paraná:
  - Octávio Cesário Pereira Júnior (until 15 March)
  - José Hosken de Novaes (from 15 March)
- Pernambuco:
  - Paulo Gustavo de Araújo Cunha (until 15 March)
  - Roberto Magalhães Melo (from 15 March)
- Piauí:
  - Genibaldo Barros (until 15 March)
  - Waldemar de Castro Macedo (from 15 March)
- Rio de Janeiro: Hamilton Xavier
- Rio Grande do Norte: Geraldo Melo
- Rio Grande do Sul:
  - José Augusto Amaral de Sousa (until 15 March)
  - Otávio Badui Germano (from 15 March)
- Santa Catarina:
  - Marcos Henrique Büechler (until 15 March)
  - Henrique Hélion Velho de Córdova (from 15 March)
- São Paulo:
  - Ferreira Filho (until 15 March)
  - José Maria Marin (from 15 March)
- Sergipe:
  - Antônio Ribeiro Sotelo (until 15 March)
  - Djenal Tavares Queiroz (from 15 March)

== Events ==
=== January ===
- January 1: Mato Grosso do Sul is officially recognized as a federative unit of Brazil.

=== February ===
- February 7: Nazi criminal Josef Mengele suffers a stroke and drowns while swimming in Bertioga. His remains are found six years later.

=== March ===
- March 15: João Figueiredo is sworn in as the 30th President of Brazil.

=== May ===
- May 11: Eunice Michiles becomes the first woman to hold a seat in the Federal Senate.

=== August ===
- August 17: The National Association of Newspapers is founded, with the aim of defending freedom of the press.
- August 28: President João Figueiredo signs the Amnesty Law. This law would grant amnesty for political crimes and crimes with a political nexus committed by members of the armed forces or member of the government between September 2, 1961 and August 15, 1979.

=== November ===
- November 6: Dr. Roberto Farina is acquitted of all criminal liability in connection with the first male-to-female gender-affirming surgery performed in Brazil.

== Births ==
=== January ===
- January 3 –
  - Adriano, footballer
  - Lucas Severino, footballer
- January 7 – Ricardo Maurício, racecar driver

=== February ===
- February 1 –
  - Clodoaldo Silva, Paralympic swimmer
  - Juan, Brazilian footballer

=== March ===
- March 7 – Arlindo Lopes, actor
- March 26 – Juliana Paes, actress and former model

=== April ===
- April 2 – Grafite, footballer

=== June ===
- June 29 – Artur Avila, mathematician

=== July ===
- July 6 – Luize Altenhofen, model and actress
- July 19 – Ellen Rocche, model
- July 27 – Marielle Franco, politician (died 2018)

=== August ===
- August 16 – Eduardo Maiorino, mixed martial artist and kick-boxer (died 2012)

=== September ===
- September 3 – Júlio César, professional footballer
- September 6 – Raphael Claus, FIFA football referee
- September 14 – Antônio Silva, kickboxer and mixed martial arts fighter
- September 24 – Fábio Aurélio, footballer
- September 27 – Danilo Gentili, comedian and television host

=== October ===
- October 28 – Glover Teixeira, mixed martial artist

=== December ===
- December 7 – Ronaldo Souza, mixed martial arts fighter

== Deaths ==
- October 3 - Humberto Teixeira, musician (born 1915)
- December 22 – Pontes de Miranda, lawyer and diplomat (born 1892)

== Sources ==
- Blumenthal, Ralph (22 July 1985). "Scientists Decide Brazil Skeleton Is Josef Mengele". The New York Times.
- Levy, Alan (2006) [1993]. Nazi Hunter: The Wiesenthal File (Revised 2002 ed.). London: Constable & Robinson. ISBN 978-1-84119-607-7.

== See also ==
- 1979 in Brazilian football
- 1979 in Brazilian television
