= 1982 in Brazil =

Events in the year 1982 in Brazil.

== Incumbents ==
=== Federal government ===
- President: General João Figueiredo
- Vice President: Aureliano Chaves

=== Governors ===
- Acre: Vacant
- Alagoas:
  - Guilherme Palmeira (until 15 March)
  - Teobaldo Vasconcelos (from 15 March)
- Amazonas:
  - José Bernardino Lindoso (until 15 May)
  - Paul Pinto Nery (from 15 May)
- Bahia: Antônio Carlos Magalhães
- Ceará:
  - Virgílio Távora (until 15 March)
  - Manuel de Castro (from 15 March)
- Espírito Santo: Eurico Vieira Resende
- Goiás: Ary Valadão
- Maranhão:
  - João Castelo (until 15 May)
  - Ivar Saldanha (from 14 May)
- Mato Grosso: Frederico Campos
- Mato Grosso do Sul: Pedro Pedrossian
- Minas Gerais: Francelino Pereira
- Pará: Alacid Nunes
- Paraíba:
  - Tarcísio Burity (until 14 May)
  - Clóvis Cavalcanti (from 14 May)
- Paraná:
  - Nei Braga (until 14 May)
  - José Hosken de Novais (from 14 May)
- Pernambuco:
  - Marco Maciel (until 15 May)
  - José Muniz Ramos (from 15 May)
- Piauí: Lucídio Portela
- Rio de Janeiro: Antônio Chagas Freitas
- Rio Grande do Norte: Lavoisier Maia
- Rio Grande do Sul: José Augusto Amaral de Souza
- Rondônia: Jorge Teixeira de Oliveira (from 4 January)
- Santa Catarina:
  - Jorge Bornhausen (until 14 May)
  - Henrique Córdova (from 14 May)
- São Paulo:
  - Paulo Maluf (until 14 May)
  - José Maria Marin (from 14 May)
- Sergipe:
  - Augusto Franco (until 14 May)
  - Djenal Queirós (from 14 May)

=== Vice governors ===
- Acre: José Fernandes Rego
- Alagoas: Teobaldo Vasconcelos Barbosa
- Amazonas:
  - Paulo Pinto Nery (until 14 May)
  - Vacant thereafter (from 14 May)
- Bahia: Luis Viana Neto
- Ceará:
  - Manuel de Castro Filho (until 14 May)
  - Vacant thereafter (from 14 May)
- Espírito Santo: José Carlos Fonseca
- Goiás: Rui Brasil Cavalcanti
- Maranhão:
  - Artur Teixeira de Carvalho (until 29 January)
  - Vacant thereafter (from 14 May)
- Mato Grosso: José Vilanova Torres
- Mato Grosso do Sul: Vacant
- Minas Gerais: João Marques de Vasconcelos
- Pará: Gerson dos Santos Peres
- Paraíba:
  - Clóvis Cavalcanti (until 14 May)
  - Vacant thereafter (from 14 May)
- Paraná:
  - José Hosken de Novaes (until 14 May)
  - Vacant thereafter (from 14 May)
- Pernambuco:
  - Roberto Magalhães Melo (until 14 May)
  - Vacant thereafter (from 14 May)
- Piauí: Waldemar de Castro Macedo
- Rio de Janeiro: Hamilton Xavier
- Rio Grande do Norte: Geraldo Melo
- Rio Grande do Sul: Otávio Badui Germano
- Santa Catarina:
  - Henrique Hélion Velho de Córdova (until 14 May)
  - Vacant thereafter (from 14 May)
- São Paulo:
  - José Maria Marin (until 14 May)
  - Vacant thereafter (from 14 May)
- Sergipe:
  - Djenal Tavares Queiroz (until 14 May)
  - Vacant thereafter (from 14 May)

== Events ==
=== January ===
- January 4: Rondônia, Brazil's 23rd state, is established.
- January 7: The inauguration of the Afro-Brazilian Museum in Salvador, Bahia.

=== February ===
- February 11: The Superior Electoral Court grants definitive registration to the Workers' Party by a unanimous vote.

=== March ===
- March 22: Gubernatorial candidates of São Paulo, Franco Montoro (PMDB) and Reinaldo de Barros (PDS), hold the first televised debate after the Falcão Law (prohibition of opposition parties) was suspended.

=== May ===
- May 11-15: President João Baptista Figueiredo visits the United States to meet with US President Ronald Reagan in Washington, DC.

=== June ===
- June 8: A Boeing 727 plane, flying VASP 168, crashes in the Serra da Aratanha, near Pacatuba, Ceará, killing all 137 occupants. This would become the biggest air accident in the history of Brazilian aviation until 2006.
- June 22: French priests Aristides Camio and François Gouriou, along with thirteen squatters of São Geraldo do Araguaia are imprisoned in Belém, Pará, after violating National Security Law.

=== October ===
- October 4: Japanese Crown Prince Naruhito heads to Brasília for his ten-day visit to Brazil.

=== November ===
- November 5: The largest hydroelectric plant in the world, Usina Hidrelétrica de Itaipu, is opened by Presidents João Figueiredo of Brazil and Alfredo Stroessner of Paraguay.
- November 15: Direct elections for governors, senators, mayors, federal and state deputies are held.

=== December ===
- December 13: 91 members of the Brazilian Communist Party are arrested for participating in their own 7th congress in São Paulo.

== Births ==
=== January ===
- January 15 – Julio Campos, racecar driver
- January 17 – Mel Lisboa, actress
- January 19 – Pierre, former professional footballer

=== February ===
- February 17 – Adriano, footballer

=== March ===
- March 8 – Marjorie Estiano, actress and singer

=== April ===
- April 22 – Kaká, footballer

=== May ===
- May 14 – Jessé Lopes, politician
- May 29 – Ana Beatriz Barros, model

=== June ===
- June 11 – Jânio Natal Júnior, politician
- June 17 – Alex, association football player

=== July ===
- July 19 – Raphael Assunção, mixed martial artist

=== August ===
- August 29 – Mayana Moura, actress and former model

=== September ===
- September 21 – Eduardo Azevedo, race car driver
- September 28 – Anderson Varejão, former basketball player

== Deaths ==
=== January ===
- January 19 – Elis Regina, singer (b. 1945)

=== August ===
- August 23 – Alberto Cavalcanti, film director (b. 1897)

=== September ===
- September 18 – Carlos Carmelo Vasconcellos Motta, cardinal (b. 1890)

=== November ===
- November 23 – Adoniran Barbosa, samba singer and composer (b. 1910)

== See also ==
- 1982 in Brazilian football
- 1982 in Brazilian television
- List of Brazilian films of 1982
