= List of Brazilian films of 1982 =

A list of films produced in Brazil in 1982:

Title	Director	Cast	Genre	Notes
Acredito Que o Mundo Será Melhor	Jussara Queiroz		Documentary	
As Amantes de Helen	Walter Wanny, Mauri de Oliveira Queiroz	Kristina Keller, Arlete Moreira, Shirley Benny, Roberto Gogoni	Erotic drama	
Amor de Perversão	Alfredo Sternheim	Paulo Guarnieri, Alvamar Taddei, Leonardo Villar	Erotic drama	
Ao Sul do Meu Corpo	Paulo Cesar Saraceni	Ana Maria Nascimento e Silva, Paulo César Peréio, Nuno Leal Maia	Drama	
Aventuras da Turma da Mônica	Maurício de Souza	Maria Amélia Costa Manso, Ivete Jayme, Isaura Gomes, Silvia Cordeiro Marinho, Orlando Vigiani	Animated	
Aventuras de um Paraíba	Marco Altberg	Caíque Ferreira, Claudia Ohana	Comedy	
Bacanal De Adolescentes	Prescila Presley	Will Roberto, Merce Valsi	Erotic Drama	
Os Campeões	Carlos Coimbra	Armando Bogus, Tony Correia	Adventure	
Coisas Eróticas	Raffaele Rossi, Laente Calicchio	Zaíra Bueno, Jussara Calmon, Marília Nave, Marly Palavro	Pornographic	The first Brazilian pornographic film
Heart and Guts	Ana Carolina	Antônio Fagundes, Dina Sfat, Xuxa Lopes	Comedy	Screened at the 1982 Cannes Film Festival
O Homem do Pau-brasil	Joaquim Pedro de Andrade	Ítala Nandi, Flávio Galvão, Regina Duarte, Cristina Aché, Dina Sfat, Dora Pellegrino, Grande Otelo	Comedy	
Love Strange Love	Walter Hugo Khouri	Vera Fischer, Tarcísio Meira, Xuxa Meneghel	Drama	
Luz del Fuego	David Neves	Lucélia Santos, Walmor Chagas	Drama	
Menino do Rio	Antônio Calmon	André de Biase, Cláudia Magno, Ricardo Graça Mello, Sérgio Mallandro, Cissa Guimarães, Cláudia Ohana	Adventure	
Pra Frente, Brasil	Roberto Farias	Reginaldo Faria, Antônio Fagundes, Natália do Valle, Elizabeth Savalla	Drama	Entered into the 33rd Berlin International Film Festival
Sol Vermelho	Antonio Melliande	Amado Batista, Mario Benvenutti, Genésio Carvalho	Musical	
Tabu	Júlio Bressane	Caetano Veloso, Colé Santana, José Lewgoy	Musical	
Taras de uma Mulher Casada: O Amor Uniu Dois Corações	Wilson Rodrigues	Wilson Rodrigues, Emanuella Rodrigues, Jean Pablo de Paiva	Drama	
Os Trapalhões na Serra Pelada	J. B. Tanko	Os Trapalhões, Wilson Grey	Comedy	The most watched Brazilian film in 1982
Os Vagabundos Trapalhões	J. B. Tanko	Os Trapalhões, Louise Cardoso, Edson Celulari	Comedy	

== See also ==
- 1982 in Brazil
- 1982 in Brazilian television
