= Ary Rigo =

Brazilian politician (1946–2021)

Member of the Legislative Assembly of Mato Grosso do Sul
- In office 1 February 1999 – 31 January 2011
- In office 1 January 1979 – 31 January 1991

President of the Legislative Assembly of Mato Grosso do Sul
- In office 1 February 2001 – 31 January 2003
- Preceded by: Londres Machado
- Succeeded by: Londres Machado

Vice-Governor of Mato Grosso do Sul
- In office 15 March 1991 – 31 December 1994
- Preceded by: Pedro Pedrossian
- Succeeded by: George Takimoto

Secretary of State for Government of Mato Grosso do Sul
- Preceded by: Marcelo Miranda Soares
- Succeeded by: Wilson Barbosa Martins

Personal details
- Born: 15 November 1946; Passo Fundo, Brazil
- Died: 30 September 2021 (aged 74); Campo Grande, Brazil
- Political party: PSDB

Ary Rigo (15 November 1946 – 30 September 2021) was a Brazilian agronomist and politician. A member of the Brazilian Social Democracy Party, he served as Vice-Governor of Mato Grosso do Sul from 1991 to 1994. He was also President of the Legislative Assembly of Mato Grosso do Sul from 2001 to 2003.
