= 2026 Santa Catarina general election =

- Gubernatorial election
- 4 October 2026 (first round)
- Opinion polls

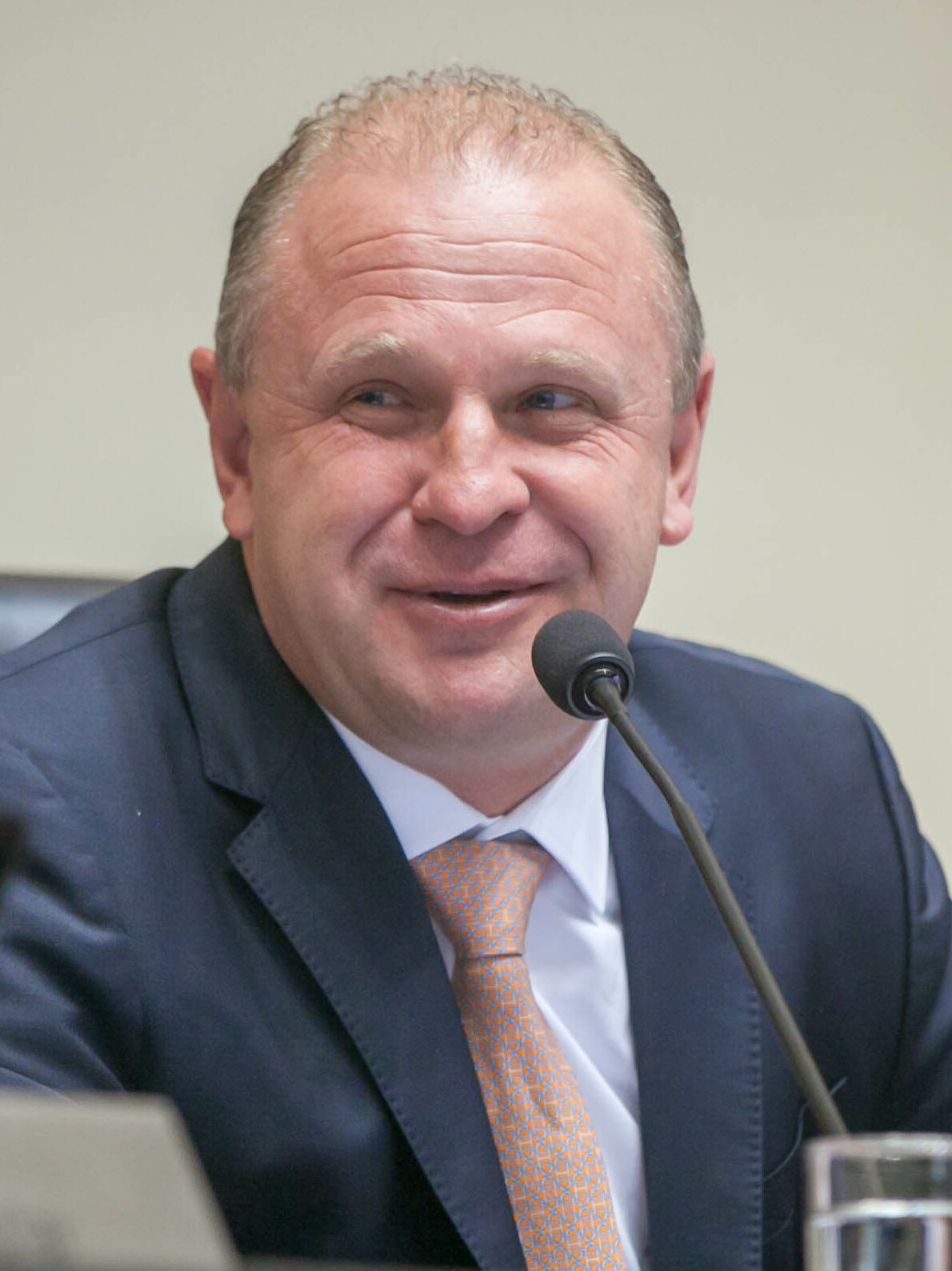
Candidate	Jorginho Mello	Gelson Merisio
Party	PL	PSB
Alliance	Fé no Trabalho e Pé na Tábua	Coragem para Mudar
Running mate	Adriano Silva (NOVO)	Angela Albino (PDT)
Popular vote	2,942,386	668,021
Percentage	68.98%	15.66%
Governor before election
Jorginho Mello
PL
Elected Governor
Jorginho Mello
PL
- Senatorial election
- 4 October 2026 (one-only round)
- Opinion polls

Candidate	Caroline de Toni	Carlos Bolsonaro	Esperidião Amin
Party	PL	PL	PP
Alliance	Fé no Trabalho e Pé na Tábua	Fé no Trabalho e Pé na Tábua
Popular vote	2,694,918	2,041,840	1,233,034
Percentage	33.46%	25.35%	15.31%
Senators before election
Esperidião Amin and Ivete da Silveira
PP and MDB
Elected Senators
Caroline de Toni and Carlos Bolsonaro
PL

The 2026 Santa Catarina general election were held on 4 October 2026 in the Brazilian state of Santa Catarina. Voters will elect a governor and vice governor, two senators, and the state's delegation to the Chamber of Deputies and the Legislative Assembly of Santa Catarina. If no candidate for governor receives a majority of valid votes in the first round, a runoff was held on 25 October 2026.

Incumbent governor Jorginho Mello of the Liberal Party (PL), elected in 2022, is eligible to run for reelection.

== Background ==
=== Electoral calendar ===
Note: This section only presents selected dates of the 2026 electoral calendar; check the official TSE/TRE websites and other official sources for detailed information.

Electoral calendar
15 May 2026	Start of regulated crowdfunding (financiamento coletivo) for pre-candidates
6 May 2026	Deadline for voters to register or transfer their voter registration
20 July to 5 August 2026	Party conventions for choosing candidates and coalitions
16 August 2026	Start of the official campaign period
4 October 2026	First round of 2026 elections
25 October 2026	Possible second round of 2026 elections

=== Governor ===
Incumbent governor Jorginho Mello (PL) was elected in 2022 in the second round with 70.69% of valid votes, defeating Décio Lima (PT). Em Janeiro de 2026, Jorginho Mello indicou Adriano Silva (New- 30) ex-prefeito de Joinville (2020-2026) para ser seu vice.

=== Senator ===
Senators in Brazil serve an 8-year term. In 2026, Santa Catarina will elect two senators, corresponding to the seats elected in 2018 (2019–2027). Incumbent senators Esperidião Amin (PP) and Ivete da Silveira (MDB) are eligible to run for reelection.

== Gubernatorial candidates ==
No.	Governor			Vice Governor			Coalition Parties
No.	Candidate	Party Federation	Relevant offices	Candidate	Party Federation	Relevant offices	Coalition Parties
14	Marcelo Brigadeiro; Marcelo Marcel Franco José da Silva	MISSÃO	No previous office	Coronel Rodrigues; Marcelo Rodrigues	MISSÂO	No previous office	No coalition
16	Professor Marcus Sodré; Marcus Alexandre Sodré	PSTU	No previous office	Professora Taty; Tatiane Pedrosa	PSTU	No previous office	No coalition
22	Jorginho Mello; Jorginho dos Santos Mello	PL	Councillor of Herval d'Oeste (1976–1980); State Deputy of Santa Catarina (1995–2011); Federal Deputy for Santa Catarina (2011–2019); Senator for Santa Catarina (2019–2022); Governor of Santa Catarina (2023–2026).	Adriano Silva; Adriano Bornschein Silva	NOVO	Mayor of Joinville (2021–2026).	Fé no Trabalho e Pé na Tábua (PL, NOVO, Republicanos, PODE, PSDB Cidadania Fed. (PSDB and Cidadania), DC, Agir and Avante)
25	Ralf Zimmer; Ralf Guimarães Zimmer Junior	PRD; Solidary Renewal Fed.	No previous office	Carlos Bordin; Carlos Alberto Bordin	Solidariedade; Solidary Renewal Fed.	No previous office	No coalition
29	Bruno Pedreiro do PCO; Brunno Andrade Dias	PCO	No previous office	Flávio Amaral; Flávio Ferreira Amaral	PCO	No previous office	No coalition
40	Gelson Merisio; Gelson Luiz Merisio	PSB	Councillor of Xanxerê (1989–1992); State Deputy of Santa Catarina (2005–2019).	Angela Albino; Angela Albino	PDT	Councillor of Florianópolis (2005–2008); State Deputy of Santa Catarina (2011–2015); State Secretary of Social Assistance, Labour and Housing of Florianópolis (2015); Federal Deputy of Santa Catarina (2015–2017).	Coragem para Mudar (PSB, PDT, FE Brasil (PT, PCdoB, PV) and PSOL REDE Fed. (PSOL and REDE))
55	João Rodrigues; João Rodrigues	PSD	Vice Mayor of Pinhalzinho (1997–2000); Mayor of Pinhalzinho (2001–2002); State Deputy of Santa Catarina (2003–2004); Federal Deputy for Santa Catarina (2011–2019); Mayor of Chapecó (2005–2010; 2021–2026).	Carlos Chiodini; Carlos Chiodini	MDB	State Deputy of Santa Catarina (2008; 2009–2010; 2011–2015); Federal Deputy for Santa Catarina (2019–2026).	Santa Catarina Acima de Tudo (PSD, MDB, UPB (UNIÃO and PP))
80	Laís Chaud; Laís Paganelli Chaid	UP	No previous office	Nathália Melo; Nathália Tarses Gomes de Melo	UP	No previous office	No coalition

== Opinion polls ==
A poll commissioned by Grupo ND/Neokemp and conducted on 1–2 December 2025 (1,008 interviews; margin of error 3.1 pp; confidence level 95%) tested the following first-round scenarios:

Candidate	Party	Scenario 1	Scenario 2
Jorginho Mello	PL	41.5%	46.3%
João Rodrigues	PSD	19.0%	24.4%
Décio Lima	PT	14.0%	—
Fabiano da Luz	PT	—	9.7%
Adriano Silva	Novo	8.2%	—
Afrânio Boppré	PSOL	3.6%	5.4%
Undecided	—	10.0%	8.9%
Blank/Null	—	3.7%	5.3%

== Senatorial candidates ==
No.	Senator			Substitute members	Coalition Parties
No.	Candidate	Party Federation	Relevant offices	Substitute members	Coalition Parties
111	Esperidião Amin; Esperidião Amin Helou Filho	PP; UPB	Mayor of Florianópolis (1975–1978; 1989–1990); Governor of Santa Catarina (1983–1987; 1999–2003); First Gentleman of Florianópolis (1997–2004); Federal Deputy for Santa Catarina (2011–2019); Senator for Santa Catarina (2019–2026).	Volnei Weber (MDB) Eni Voltolini (PP)	Santa Catarina Acima de Tudo (PSD, MDB, UPB (UNIÃO and PP))
133	Décio Lima; Décio Nery de Lima	PT; FE Brasil	Councillor of Blumenau (1993–1997); Mayor of Blumenau (1997–2005); Federal Deputy for Santa Catarina (2007–2019).	Elaine Berger (PDT) Fernanda Klitzke (PT)	Coragem para Mudar (PSB, PDT, FE Brasil (PT, PCdoB, PV) and PSOL REDE Fed. (PSOL and REDE))
144	Túlio de Amorim; Túlio de Amorim Pfuetzenreiter	MISSÃO	No previous office	Comandante Edupércio Pratts (MISSÃO) Diego Santos Vieira (MISSÃO)	No coalition
155	Lunelli; Antídio Aleixo Lunelli	MDB	Mayor of Jaraguá do Sul (2017–2022); State Deputy of Santa Catarina (2023–2026).	Clenilton Carlos Pereira (UNIÃO) Genesio Moises Spillere (PP)	Santa Catarina Acima de Tudo (PSD, MDB, UPB (UNIÃO and PP))
160	Joaninha de Oliveira; Joaninha de Oliveira	PSTU	No previous office	Jocemir Adenilson (PSTU) Adriana Pereira (PSTU)	No coalition
161	Marcos Dorval; Marcos Dorval Shimitz	PSTU	No previous office	Marcos Becker (PSTU) Wagner Betto (PSTU)	No coalition
221	Caroline de Toni; Caroline Rodrigues de Toni	PL	Federal Deputy for Santa Catarina (2019–2026).	Geraldo Neto Wetzel (NOVO) Andrey Otavio Tomazi (PL)	Fé no Trabalho e Pé na Tábua (PL, NOVO, Republicanos, PODE, PSDB Cidadania Fed. (PSDB and Cidadania), DC, Agir and Avante)
222	Carlos Bolsonaro; Carlos Nantes Bolsonaro	PL	Councillor of Rio de Janeiro (2001–2025).	Rafael Caleffi (PL) Balduino Rodrigues Ferreira (PL)	Fé no Trabalho e Pé na Tábua (PL, NOVO, Republicanos, PODE, PSDB Cidadania Fed. (PSDB and Cidadania), DC, Agir and Avante)
250	Jeferson da Rocha; Jeferson da Rocha	PRD; Solidary Renewal Fed.	No previous office	Camila Zimmer (Solidariedade) (Solidariedade)	Solidary Renewal Fed. (PRD and Solidariedade)
290	Carol; Caroline Sant'anna	PCO	No previous office	Domingos (PCO) Gilberto Silveira (PCO)	No coalition
500	Afrânio Boppré; Afrânio Tadeu Boppré	PSOL; PSOL REDE Fed.	Vice Mayor of Florianópolis (1993–1997); State Deputy for Santa Catarina (2003–2007); Councillor of Florianópolis (2013–2026);	Luci Choinacki (PT) Cida da Silva (PT)	Coragem para Mudar (PSB, PDT, FE Brasil (PT, PCdoB, PV) and PSOL REDE Fed. (PSOL and REDE))
800	Ana Lúcia; Ana Lúcia da Silveira Machado	UP	No previous office	Jaqueline Almeida Camargo (UP) Jorge Luiz Adão (UP)	No coalition
808	Marlene Soccas; Marlene de Souza Soccas Sazan	UP	No previous office	Adriana Rio (UP) Professor Jacson (UP)	No coalition

== Results ==
=== Governor ===
Candidate	Running mate	Party	Votes	%
Jorginho Mello (incumbent)	Adriano Silva (NOVO)	Liberal Party	2,942,386	68.98
Gelson Merisio	Angela Albino (PDT)	Brazilian Socialist Party	668,021	15.66
João Rodrigues	Carlos Chiodini (MDB)	Social Democratic Party	569,263	13.35
Marcelo Brigadeiro	Marcelo Rodrigues	Mission Party	46,624	1.09
Laís Chaud	Nathália Melo	Popular Unity	21,252	0.50
Ralf Zimmer	Carlos Bordin (Solidariedade)	Democratic Renewal Party	9,000	0.21
Marcus Sodré	Tatiane Pasdiora	United Socialist Workers' Party	6,682	0.16
Bruno Pedreiro	Flávio Amaral	Workers' Cause Party	2,413	0.06
Total			4,265,641	100.00
Valid votes			4,265,641	92.04
Invalid votes			198,989	4.29
Blank votes			169,920	3.67
Total votes			4,634,550	100.00
Registered voters/turnout			5,719,541	81.03
PL hold				

Popular vote
Mello	68.98%
Merisio	15.66%
Rodrigues	13.35%
Others	2.02%

=== Senator ===
Candidate	Party	Votes	%
Caroline de Toni	PL	2,694,918	33.46
Carlos Bolsonaro	PL	2,041,840	25.35
Esperidião Amin (incumbent)	PP	1,233,034	15.31
Décio Lima	PT	823,200	10.22
Afrânio Boppré	PSOL	657,451	8.16
Lunelli	MDB	482,413	5.99
Túlio de Amorim	MISSÃO	59,365	0.74
Ana Lucia Machado	UP	17,200	0.21
Jeferson Rocha	PRD	14,060	0.17
Caroline Sant'anna	PCO	11,975	0.15
Marlene Soccas	UP	7,740	0.10
Joaninha de Oliveira	PSTU	6,228	0.08
Marcos Dorval	PSTU	3,651	0.05
Total		8,053,075	100.00
Valid votes		8,053,075	86.88
Invalid votes		608,907	6.57
Blank votes		607,118	6.55
Total votes		9,269,100	100.00
Registered voters/turnout		5,719,541	81.03
PL gain from PP			
PL gain from MDB			

Popular vote
De Toni	33.46%
Bolsonaro	25.35%
Amin	15.31%
Lima	10.22%
Others	15.65%

=== Chamber of Deputies ===
Party or alliance		Votes	%	Seats	+/–
Liberal Party		1,539,134	36.37	7	▲1
Brazil of Hope	Workers' Party	574,630	13.58	2	Steady
Brazil of Hope	Communist Party of Brazil	115,825	2.74	1	▲1
Brazil of Hope	Green Party	1,503	0.04	0	Steady
Brazilian Democratic Movement		384,396	9.08	1	▼2
Republicanos		340,571	8.05	1	▲1
New Party		302,952	7.16	1	Steady
Social Democratic Party		282,962	6.69	1	▼1
Podemos		218,678	5.17	1	▲1
Progressive Union	Progressistas	191,874	4.53	1	▲1
Progressive Union	Brazil Union	134,770	3.18	0	▼1
Mission Party		49,229	1.16	0	New
PSOL REDE	Socialism and Liberty Party	41,420	0.98	0	Steady
PSOL REDE	Sustainability Network	745	0.02	0	Steady
Democratic Labour Party		16,563	0.39	0	Steady
Solidary Renewal	Democratic Renewal Party	11,526	0.27	0	Steady
Solidary Renewal	Solidariedade	808	0.02	0	Steady
Avante		5,955	0.14	0	Steady
Christian Democracy		4,712	0.11	0	Steady
PSDB Cidadania	Cidadania	3,972	0.09	0	▼1
PSDB Cidadania	Brazilian Social Democracy Party	2,138	0.05	0	Steady
Popular Unity		3,615	0.09	0	Steady
Brazilian Socialist Party		3,015	0.07	0	0
Workers' Cause Party		505	0.01	0	Steady
Total		4,231,498	100.00	16	–
Valid votes		4,231,498	91.30		
Invalid votes		151,228	3.26		
Blank votes		251,824	5.43		
Total votes		4,634,550	100.00		
Registered voters/turnout		5,719,541	81.03		

=== Legislative Assembly ===
Party or alliance		Votes	%	Seats	+/–
Liberal Party		1,528,729	35.79	16	▲5
Brazil of Hope	Workers' Party	477,829	11.19	5	▲1
Brazil of Hope	Communist Party of Brazil	25,430	0.60	0	Steady
Brazil of Hope	Green Party	290	0.01	0	Steady
Brazilian Democratic Movement		377,869	8.85	4	▼2
Republicanos		331,221	7.75	3	▲2
Social Democratic Party		320,182	7.50	3	Steady
Progressive Union	Brazil Union	259,409	6.07	2	▼1
Progressive Union	Progressistas	209,130	4.90	2	▼1
Podemos		195,710	4.58	2	▼1
New Party		187,010	4.38	1	Steady
PSOL REDE	Socialism and Liberty Party	133,027	3.11	1	Steady
PSOL REDE	Sustainability Network	925	0.02	0	Steady
Democratic Labour Party		96,478	2.26	1	Steady
PSDB Cidadania	Brazilian Social Democracy Party	64,798	1.52	0	▼2
PSDB Cidadania	Cidadania	9,427	0.22	0	Steady
Mission Party		34,926	0.82	0	New
Solidary Renewal	Democratic Renewal Party	13,371	0.31	0	▼1
Solidary Renewal	Solidariedade	935	0.02	0	Steady
Avante		2,654	0.06	0	Steady
United Socialist Workers' Party		1,230	0.03	0	Steady
Agir		504	0.01	0	Steady
Total		4,271,084	100.00	40	–
Valid votes		4,271,084	92.16		
Invalid votes		127,937	2.76		
Blank votes		235,529	5.08		
Total votes		4,634,550	100.00		
Registered voters/turnout		5,719,541	81.03		
