= Bornhausen (surname) =

Bornhausen is a German surname. Notable people with the surname include:

- Jorge Bornhausen
- Karl Bornhausen (1882–1940), German Protestant theologian
- Paulo Konder Bornhausen (1929–2024), Brazilian lawyer and politician
