= Mônica Riedel =

Brazilian public figure and first lady of Mato Grosso do Sul

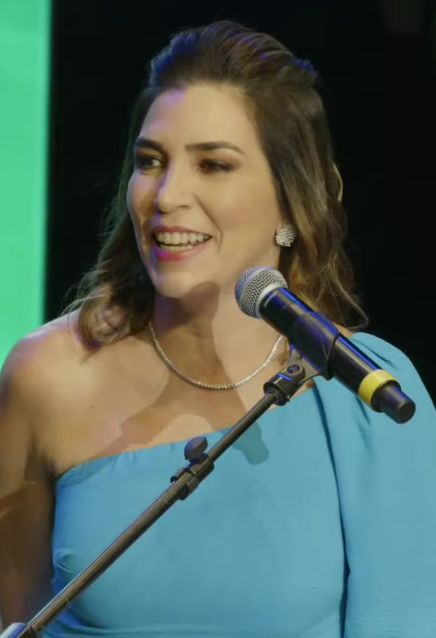
- Riedel in 2023

First Lady of Mato Grosso do Sul
- Incumbent
- Assumed role 1 January 2023
- Governor: Eduardo Riedel
- Preceded by: Fátima Azambuja

Personal details
- Born: Mônica Morais Dias Riedel Rio de Janeiro, Brazil
- Spouse: Eduardo Riedel (m. 1994)
- Children: 2
- Education: Fundação Getulio Vargas; Pontifical Catholic University of Rio de Janeiro; Dom Bosco Catholic University

Mônica Morais Dias Riedel is a Brazilian public figure who has served as first lady of Mato Grosso do Sul since 1 January 2023, as the wife of Governor Eduardo Riedel. She has participated in charitable campaigns and initiatives promoting women's employment, social assistance and community engagement.

Riedel has been associated particularly with Seu Abraço Aquece, an annual winter clothing donation campaign organised by the Mato Grosso do Sul state government. She serves as its patron, supporting the mobilisation of public employees, civil society organisations and private institutions.

== Early life and education ==
Mônica Morais Dias Riedel was born in Rio de Janeiro, Brazil. She studied design and business management, with educational affiliations reported at the Pontifical Catholic University of Rio de Janeiro, Dom Bosco Catholic University and Fundação Getulio Vargas.

She met Eduardo Riedel in Rio de Janeiro in 1987. The couple married in 1994 and subsequently moved to Mato Grosso do Sul, where Eduardo Riedel became involved in agricultural business and rural management. They have two children, Marcela and Rafael.

== Public life ==
=== 2022 gubernatorial election ===
During the 2022 Mato Grosso do Sul gubernatorial election, Mônica participated in campaign activities supporting her husband, who was the candidate of the Brazilian Social Democracy Party (PSDB).

She attended meetings with voters and women's groups, including campaign activities in Dourados that addressed social programmes and women's participation in public life.

On 30 October 2022, Eduardo Riedel was elected governor of Mato Grosso do Sul, defeating Renan Contar in the second round with 56.90% of the valid votes.

Following the election, Mônica became the incoming first lady, succeeding Fátima Azambuja, wife of outgoing Governor Reinaldo Azambuja.

In December 2022, she stated that she intended to continue supporting her husband while maintaining her family life, rather than taking a formal position in the state administration.

=== First lady of Mato Grosso do Sul (2023–present) ===
Mônica Riedel assumed the ceremonial role of first lady on 1 January 2023, when Eduardo Riedel was inaugurated governor at the Legislative Assembly of Mato Grosso do Sul.

Although the position of first lady is not an elected government office, she has participated in state-sponsored charitable activities, awareness campaigns and community events.

Her public activities have included campaigns supporting women's employment, the distribution of donated clothing to socially vulnerable populations, and participation in events concerning women's rights and public health.

=== Women's employment and social participation ===
In 2023, Riedel participated in Emprega Mulher, an initiative organised by the Mato Grosso do Sul Employment Foundation (Funtrab) to promote women's access to employment opportunities.

The initiative offered information on job vacancies, professional qualifications, career guidance and assistance with preparing résumés. Riedel attended activities associated with the programme and highlighted the importance of women's economic participation.

She also participated in the state's activities for the international 16 Days of Activism Against Gender-Based Violence campaign, which aims to raise awareness of violence against women and promote their rights.

== Charitable and community activities ==
=== Seu Abraço Aquece ===
Seu Abraço Aquece – Doe Calor e Faça o Bem (English: Your Hug Warms – Donate Warmth and Do Good) is an annual winter clothing donation campaign organised by the Mato Grosso do Sul Secretariat of State for Administration (SAD).

Established in 2015, the initiative collects coats, blankets, shoes and other winter clothing for distribution to social assistance organisations and vulnerable families.

Riedel has served as patron of the campaign during her tenure as first lady, participating in launches, awareness activities and donation ceremonies. The campaign is organised by state government employees, in cooperation with participating institutions.

==== 2023 and 2024 ====
In 2023, Riedel participated in the campaign's donation activities, which involved government employees and more than 200 charitable organisations.

In 2024, the campaign collected approximately 189,000 donated items, distributed to 310 philanthropic organisations, according to figures subsequently published by the Secretariat of Administration.

==== 2025 campaign ====
The 2025 edition marked the tenth anniversary of Seu Abraço Aquece.

The campaign was launched internally in April 2025, with Riedel participating alongside officials from the Secretariat of Administration. The initiative involved 19 partner organisations, including professional associations, public institutions and private companies.

On 6 April 2025, the campaign's public launch took place during an event organised by the Association of Parents and Friends of Autistic People (AMA), in Campo Grande's Parque dos Poderes.

The campaign collected more than 161,800 clothing items for distribution to 333 institutions in 32 municipalities of Mato Grosso do Sul.

==== 2026 campaign ====
On 1 April 2026, the eleventh edition of the campaign was formally launched at the Rubens Gil de Camillo Convention Centre in Campo Grande.

Mônica Riedel continued as its patron. The programme sought donations of winter clothing, blankets, footwear and related items from public institutions and partner organisations.

In May, the campaign mobilised different branches of state government and several other public institutions.

The Mato Grosso do Sul Public Prosecutor's Office (MPMS) contributed approximately 400 items through donations organised by its members and employees.

Employees of the Secretariat of Environment, Development, Science, Technology and Innovation (Semadesc) and its affiliated agencies collected 6,232 items, according to the secretariat's published figures.

By late May 2026, the campaign had collected more than 192,000 items statewide, with distribution planned for more than 586 social assistance institutions across all 79 municipalities of Mato Grosso do Sul.

=== Corrida dos Poderes ===
Riedel has participated in the Corrida dos Poderes (Race of the Branches of Government), a sporting event in Campo Grande involving public employees and members of the public.

She was associated with the organisation and promotion of the event in 2023, which aimed to encourage physical activity and integration among the state's public institutions.

The event also became associated with charitable initiatives, including the Seu Abraço Aquece clothing collection campaign in 2026.

== Personal life ==
Mônica Riedel is married to Eduardo Riedel, who became governor of Mato Grosso do Sul in January 2023 and was re-elected in October 2026. They have two children.

== See also ==
- Eduardo Riedel
- Government of Eduardo Riedel
- List of governors of Mato Grosso do Sul
- Mato Grosso do Sul

Honorary titles
Preceded by Fátima Azambuja	First Lady of Mato Grosso do Sul; 2023–present	Incumbent
