= João Rodrigues =

João Rodrigues may refer to:

- João Rodrigues Tçuzu (1561–1633), Portuguese Jesuit missionary in Japan and China
- Juan Rodriguez (trader) (1500s–1600s), also known as Juan Rodriguez or Jan Rodrigues, first known non-indigenous resident of Manhattan
- João Barbosa Rodrigues (1842–1909), Brazilian botanist
- João Pedro Rodrigues (born 1966), Portuguese film director
- João Rodrigues (sailor) (born 1971), Portuguese Olympic sailor
- João Rodrigues (cyclist) (born 1994), Portuguese road racing cyclist
- Joao Rodríguez (footballer) (born 1996), Colombian footballer who plays for Central Córdoba
- João Rodrigues (musician), Portuguese drummer and member of the band Napa
- João Rodrigues (politician) (born 1967), Brazilian politician
