= Altemir Gregolin =

Brazilian politician and veterinarian

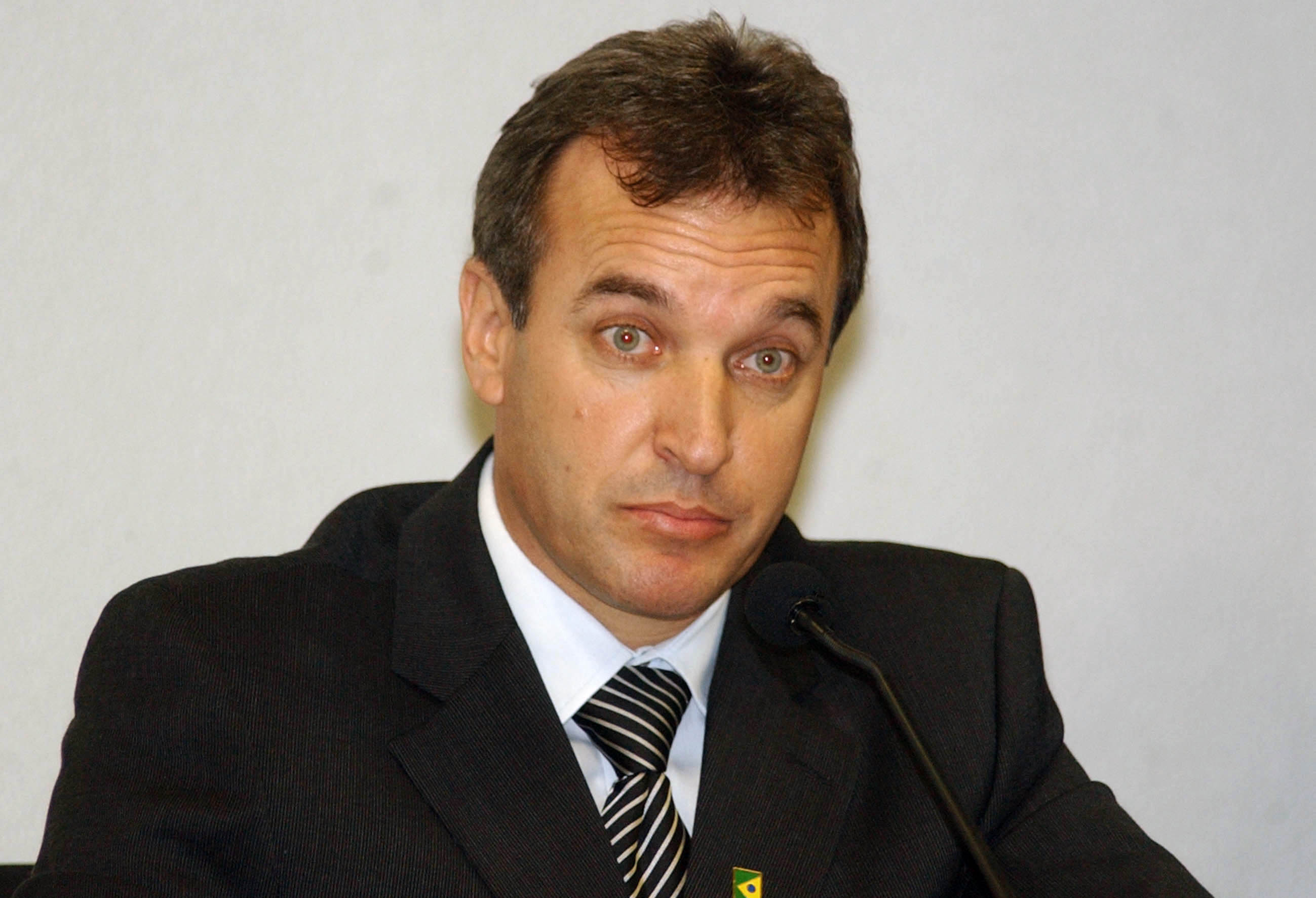

Ministry of Fishing and Aquaculture of Brazil
- In office 3 April 2006 – 1 January 2011
- President: Luiz Inácio Lula da Silva
- Preceded by: José Fritsch
- Succeeded by: Ideli Salvatti

Personal details
- Born: 20 April 1964 (age 62) Coronel Freitas (SC)
- Party: Workers' Party
- Occupation: Veterinarian; Statesman

Altemir Gregolin (born 20 April 1964) is a veterinarian, Brazilian politician a member of the Workers Party (PT) since 1985. He served between 3 April 2006 to 1 January 2011, the end of the government of President Luiz Inácio Lula da Silva.
