= Governorate of Mato Grosso do Sul =

The Governorate of Mato Grosso do Sul is the state governor's workplace and seat of government. Located in Parque dos Poderes, the building also houses the headquarters of the Secretary of State for Government and Strategic Management and the Undersecretary of Communication.

Designed by the architect Élvio Garabini, who also designed most of the buildings in Parque dos Poderes, it was inaugurated in 1983, with the entire complex of public bodies. The Governorate houses only the governor's office, which has its own house.

== History ==
The initial project for Parque dos Poderes envisaged a government palace, at first without a residential area, but then-governor Pedro Pedrossian discarded the idea. The Chief Executive's office was installed in a building that would have been used as a secretariat, which today houses the Governorship.

As well as the political-administrative complex, the government headquarters had works started in 1981 and was delivered two years later. In the 2000s, a project for a government palace with a residential area was discussed, but it never happened.

== See also ==
- Palácio do Planalto
