= Janio =

Janio is a given name. It may refer to:

- Jânio (footballer) (born 1991), Jânio Daniel do Nascimento Santos, Brazilian football forward
- Janio Bikel (born 1995), Portuguese football defensive midfielder
- Jânio Natal Júnior (born 1982), Brazilian politician
- Janio Posito (born 1989), Peruvian football forward
- Jânio Quadros (1917-1992), 22nd President of Brazil
