= Ideli Salvatti =

Brazilian politician

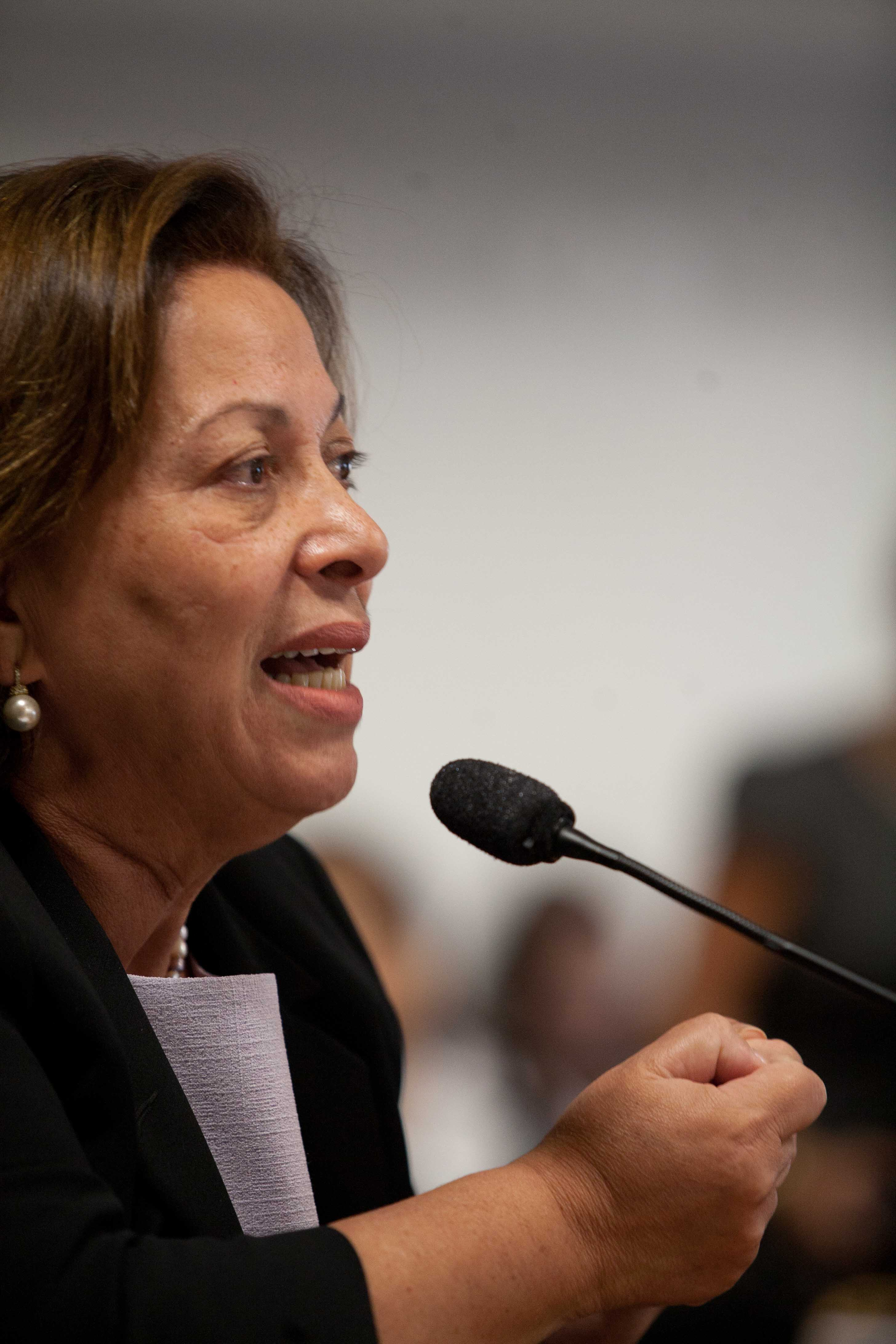

Secretary of Human Rights
- In office 1 April 2014 – 16 April 2015
- President: Dilma Rousseff
- Preceded by: Maria do Rosário
- Succeeded by: Pepe Vargas

Secretary of Institutional Affairs
- In office 10 June 2011 – 1 April 2014
- President: Dilma Rousseff
- Preceded by: Luiz Sérgio Nóbrega
- Succeeded by: Ricardo Berzoini

Minister of Fishing and Aquaculture
- In office 1 January 2011 – 10 June 2011
- President: Dilma Rousseff
- Preceded by: Altemir Gregolin
- Succeeded by: Luiz Sérgio Nóbrega

Senator for Santa Catarina
- In office 1 February 1995 – 1 January 2011

Congress Government Leader
- In office 18 May 2009 – 10 July 2010
- Preceded by: Roseana Sarney
- Succeeded by: Gilmar Machado

State Deputy of Santa Catarina
- In office 1 January 1995 – 1 January 2003

Personal details
- Born: 18 March 1952 (age 74) São Paulo, Brazil
- Party: PT (1980–present)
- Profession: Teacher

Ideli Salvatti is a Brazilian politician. She became the first woman to be elected senator of the state of Santa Catarina. She was the Minister of Fisheries and Aquaculture in the Dilma Rousseff Government. She later worked in the Secretariat of Institutional Relations and Secretariat of Human Rights.

== Biography ==
She graduated with a degree in Physics from the University of Paraná . She married Eurides Mescolotto and had two children and later she married Jeferson Figueiredo in 2009.

Brazilian National Congress
| Preceded by Roseana Sarney | Congress Government Leader; 2009–10 | Succeeded by Gilmar Machado |
Political offices
| Preceded by Altemir Gregolin | Minister of Fishing and Aquaculture; 2011 | Succeeded by Luiz Sérgio Nóbrega |
| Preceded by Luiz Sérgio Nóbrega | Secretary of Institutional Affairs; 2011–14 | Succeeded by Ricardo Berzoini |
| Preceded by Maria do Rosário | Secretary of Human Rights; 2014–15 | Succeeded by Pepe Vargas |
