= Paulo Corrêa =

Brazilian politician

His Excellency Paulo Corrêa
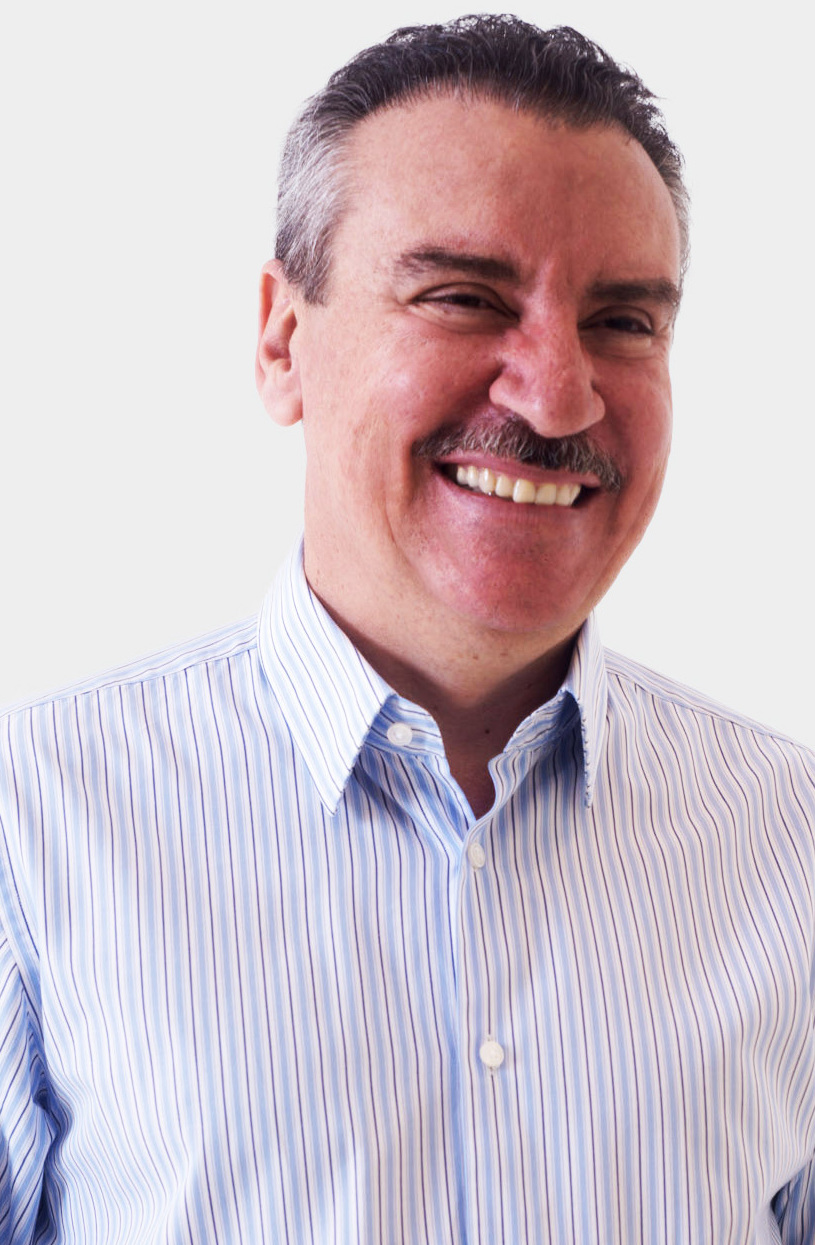

President of the Legislative Assembly of Mato Grosso do Sul
- Incumbent
- Assumed office 1 February 2019
- Preceded by: Junior Mochi

State deputy of Mato Grosso do Sul
- Incumbent
- Assumed office 1 February 1997

Personal details
- Born: Paulo José Araújo Corrêa; 24 July 1957 (age 68) Campo Grande, Brazil
- Party: Brazilian Social Democracy Party
- Profession: Civil engineer

Paulo José Araújo Corrêa (born 24 July 1957) is a Brazilian politician, affiliated with the Brazilian Social Democratic Party, president of the Legislative Assembly of Mato Grosso do Sul since February 2019, serving his sixth term as State Deputy for the state.

In April 2018, Paulo Corrêa joined the Brazilian Social Democracy Party. In the 2018 elections Paulo Corrêa was re-elected with 27,664 votes to continue representing the population of Mato Grosso do Sul in the state parliament. On February 1, 2019, he was elected President of the Legislative Assembly of Mato Grosso do Sul for the 2019-2020 biennium.
