= First Lady of Mato Grosso do Sul =

- Primeira-dama do Mato Grosso do Sul

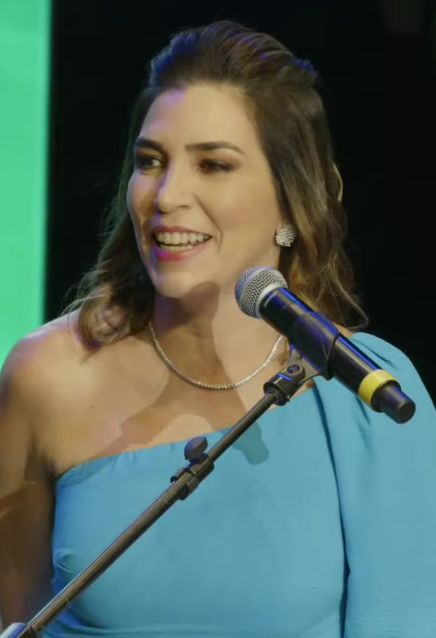
- Current; Mônica Riedel since 1 January 2023
- Style: Dona
- Residence: Mato Grosso do Sul
- Term length: during the term of Governor
- Inaugural holder: Amélia Santana
- Formation: 1 January 1979 (47 years ago)

The First Lady of Mato Grosso do Sul (Brazilian Portuguese: primeira-dama de Mato Grosso do Sul) is the title used by the wives of the governor of Mato Grosso do Sul, Brazil. The first to hold the position was Amélia Santana, wife of the first governor Harry Amorim Costa. The current First Lady of Mato Grosso do Sul is Mônica Riedel, wife of Eduardo Riedel.

Generally, the first ladies of Mato Grosso do Sul, in addition to serving as hostess of the state and accompanying the governor to events, engage in activism and support public causes to benefit the state's population.

== First ladies ==
1. Amélia Santana
2. Maria Antonina Cançado Soares
3. Ilda Salgado
4. Maria Aparecida Pedrossian
5. Nelly Martins
6. Fairte Tebet
7. Maria Antonina Cançado Soares
8. Maria Aparecida Pedrossian
9. Nelly Martins
10. Gilda Gomes
11. Elisabeth Maria Machado
12. Fátima Azambuja
13. Mônica Riedel

== See also ==
- List of governors of Mato Grosso do Sul
