= Bel Kutner =

Brazilian actress and theater director (born 1970)

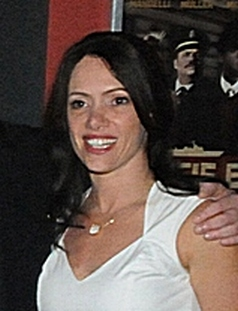
- Kutner in 2012
- Born: Isabel Kutner de Souza; 27 May 1970 (age 55); Rio de Janeiro, Brazil
- Occupations: Actress; theater director
- Years active: 1987–present
- Spouses: Nicolas Trevijano (m. 1995; div. 2000) Fábio Mondego (m. 2000; div. 2008)
- Children: 1
- Parents: Paulo José (father); Dina Sfat (mother)

Isabel Kutner de Souza (born 27 May 1970) is a Brazilian actress and theater director.

== Biography ==
The actress Isabel Kutner de Souza was born on May 27, 1970, daughter of actors Dina Sfat and Paulo José, and sister of actress Ana Kutner and director Clara Kutner.

== Career ==
The choice of profession was easy and precocious. At age 13, went to study theater and at 15 was already sure that she was going to be an actress. It began in television in the Rede Manchete, in the TV soap opera Corpo Santo (87), as Renata. She then stars in Bebê a Bordo (88) as the younger version of Laura, a character played by her mother, Dina Sfat.

Soon, in double dose, she makes the miniseries Meu Marido (91), as Aline and the TV soap opera Vamp (91), as Scarlet. Later, also in double dose, she makes the miniseries Sex Appeal (93), as Carla and the telenovela/TV soap opera Olho no Olho (93), as Júlia. In 1996, she transferred to SBT, where she made the telenovela Razão de Viver (96), as Rosa.

In 1997, she returns to Rede Globo in the soap opera Anjo Mau (97), as Helena Jordão Ferraz, and in 1999, she does the miniseries Chiquinha Gonzaga (99), as Maria Gonzaga do Amaral. She then makes two more telenovelas by Antônio Calmon, An Um Anjo Caiu do Céu (2001), as Lulu and Começar de Novo (2004), as Marilyn Monteiro, besides the telenovela Desejos de Mulher (2002), as Carol. Afterwards, she participates in Eterna Magia (2007), as Bertha, and soon, she makes A Favorita (2008), as Amélia Gurgel, making pair with Mário Gomes (Francisco).

In 2010, Bel participated in the telenovela Escrito nas Estrelas, as Dr. Virgínia, and in 2011, participated in the remake of O Astro, as secretary Sílvia, who has an affair with a married man, Amin Hayalla (Tato Gabus Mendes). In 2012, Bel played the submissive Marialva in the remake of the novel Gabriela. In 2013, she was cast for the cast of the soap opera Amor à Vida, playing nurse Joana Rangel, who suffered from dating Luciano (Lucas Romano) who was younger than herself.

In 2015, Bel interpreted teacher Darlene in Verdades Secretas. In 2018, after a brief visit to RecordTV where she participated in the third season of the Conselho Tutelar series, Bel returns to the soap operas of Rede Globo on O Outro Lado do Paraíso.

== Personal life ==
In 1989 she began dating actor Eduardo Moscovis, the relationship lasted three years.

She was married to actor Nicolas Trevijano from 1995 to 2000. In the same year, 2000, Bel married the singer Fábio Mondego, lead singer of the band Os Impossíveis, she has a son, Davi, born in 2005, the result of the relationship; Davi has autism and tuberous sclerosis. They separated in 2008, after eight years of union.

Since 2009, Bel has been dating Pedro Delamare, owner of the Gula Gula restaurant chain.

== Filmography ==
=== Television ===
Year	Title	Role	Notes
1987	Corpo Santo	Renata Brynner	
1988	Bebê a Bordo	Laura Guedes Nóbrega Petraglia (jovem)	Participation
1991	Meu Marido	Gabriela (Gabi)	
1991	Vamp	Scarleth de Araújo Góes	
1992	Você Decide		Episode: "A Outra"
1993	Sex Appeal	Carla	
1993	Olho no Olho	Júlia Grilo	
1996	Razão de Viver	Rosa	
1997	Anjo Mau	Helena Jordão Ferraz	
1998	Você Decide		Episode: "Síndrome"
1999	Chiquinha Gonzaga	Maria Gonzaga do Amaral	
1999	Você Decide		Episode: "Trio em Lá Menor"
2001	Um Anjo Caiu do Céu	Luciana (Lulu)	
2002	Desejos de Mulher	Carol	Participation
2002	Malhação	Sônia	Season 9; Participation
2004	Começar de Novo	Marilyn Monteiro / Rita	
2005	Clara e o Chuveiro do Tempo	Mariana	Year-end special
2006	Sítio do Picapau Amarelo	Flor	Season 6
2007	Eterna Magia	Roberta Fontes (Bertha)	
2008	A Favorita	Amélia Mendonça Gurgel (Amelinha)	
2009	Xuxa Especial de Natal	Star of Bethlehem	Year-end special
2010	Escrito nas Estrelas	Drª Virgínia	
2011	Batendo Ponto	Verinha	Participation
2011	O Astro	Sílvia	
2012	Gabriela	Marialva de Tavares	
2013	Amor à Vida	Joana Rangel	
2014	Geração Brasil	Doctor of Sandra	Participation
2015	As Canalhas	Maria da Silva	Episode: "Maria"
2015	Verdades Secretas	Darlene	
2017	Perrengue	Sandra Assis	
2018	Conselho Tutelar	Angélica	Season 3; Participation
2018	O Outro Lado do Paraíso	Diva Alcântara	Episodes: "March 22–27, 2018"
2021	Nos Tempos do Imperador	Celestina	
2022	Travessia	Lídia	

=== Films ===
Year	Title	Role	Notes
1993	O Coringa		Short film
1995	Carlota Joaquina, Princess of Brazil	Francisca	
2006	Gatão de Meia Idade	Martinha	
2009	Nesta Data Querida	Flávia	Short film
2012	Reis e Ratos	Dulce, Director of Radio	
