= Gerson Claro =

Brazilian politician (born 1967)

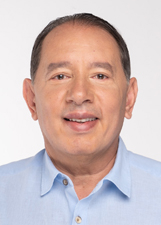
- Claro in 2022

President of the Legislative Assembly of Mato Grosso do Sul
- Incumbent
- Assumed office 1 February 2023

Personal details
- Born: 8 November 1967 (age 58)
- Party: Progressistas

Gerson Claro Dino (born 8 November 1967) is a Brazilian politician serving as a member of the Legislative Assembly of Mato Grosso do Sul since 2023. He has served as president of the Assembly since 2023.
