= Antônio Carlos Konder Reis =

Brazilian politician

Konder Reis in 1975

Antônio Carlos Konder Reis (16 December 1924 – 12 June 2018) was a Brazilian politician.

Konder Reis sat on the Legislative Assembly of Santa Catarina between 1947 and 1955, when he was first elected to the Chamber of Deputies. He became a member of the Federal Senate in 1963, serving until 1975, after which he was appointed governor of Santa Catarina. Konder Reis yielded the governorship to Jorge Bornhausen in 1979. Konder Reis was elected to a second term as deputy between 1987 and 1991, when he was named vice governor of Santa Catarina. He returned to lead Santa Catarina from 1994 to 1995, and served a third term as deputy between 1998 and 2003.

He died on 12 June 2018, aged 93.
