= Mar de Rosas =

1977 film by Ana Carolina

- Directed by: Ana Carolina
- Written by: Ana Carolina
- Produced by: José Carlos Escalero
- Starring: Cristina Pereira; Norma Bengell; Miriam Muniz; Hugo Carvana
- Music by: Paulo Herculano
- Distributed by: Embrafilme
- Release date: 29 July 1977
- Running time: 99 minutes
- Country: Brazil
- Language: Portuguese

Mar de Rosas is a 1977 Brazilian film directed by Ana Carolina. In November 2015, the film was ranked 81st by the Brazilian Film Critics Association (Abraccine) on its list of the 100 best Brazilian films of all time.

== Cast ==
- Norma Bengell as Felicidade
- Cristina Pereira as Betinha
- Hugo Carvana as Sérgio
- Miriam Muniz as Dona Niobi
- Otávio Augusto as Orlando Barde
- Ary Fontoura as Dr. Dirceu
- Maria Silva as Woman in the train

== Awards ==
1978: Associação Paulista dos Críticos de Arte Awards

1. Best Picture (won)
2. Best Actress (Norma Bengell) (won)
3. Best Actor (Otávio Augusto) (won)
4. Best Director (Ana Carolina) (won)
5. Best Screenplay (Ana Carolina) (won)

== See also ==
- Abraccine Top 100 Brazilian films
