= Paulo Konder Bornhausen =

Brazilian politician (1929–2024)

Member of the Legislative Assembly of Santa Catarina
- In office 1955–1959

Personal details
- Born: 6 September 1929 Rio de Janeiro, Brazil
- Died: 22 March 2024 (aged 94) Florianópolis, Santa Catarina, Brazil
- Party: UDN
- Education: Pontifical Catholic University of Rio de Janeiro
- Occupation: Lawyer

Paulo Konder Bornhausen (6 September 1929 – 22 March 2024) was a Brazilian lawyer and politician. A member of the National Democratic Union, he served in the Legislative Assembly of Santa Catarina from 1955 to 1959.

Bornhausen died in Florianópolis on 22 March 2024, at the age of 94.
