= Renato Câmara =

Brazilian politician (born 1972)

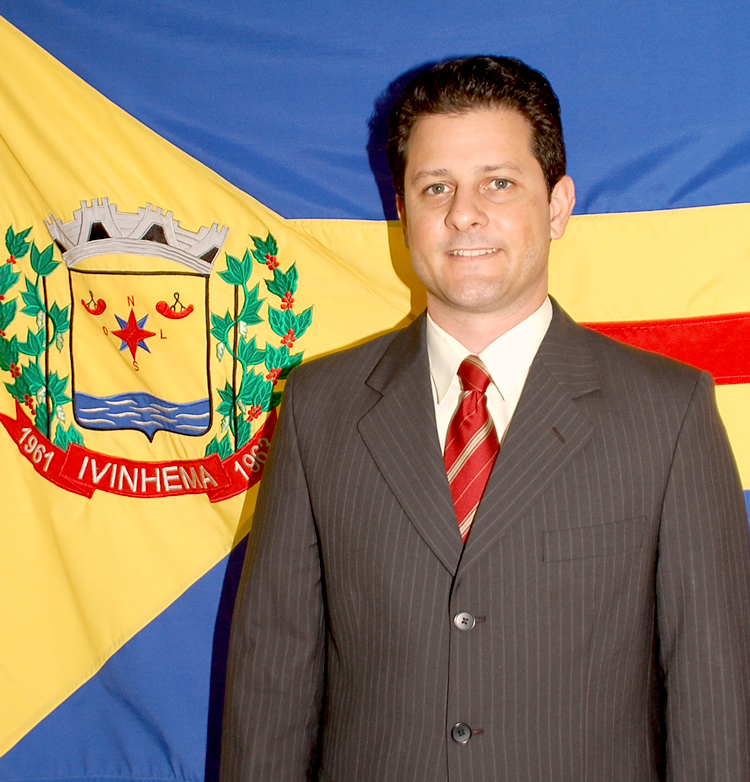
- Câmara in 2014

Member of the Legislative Assembly of Mato Grosso do Sul
- Incumbent
- Assumed office 1 February 2015

Personal details
- Born: 7 September 1972 (age 54)
- Party: Brazilian Democratic Movement
- Parent: Nelito Câmara (father)

Renato Pieretti Câmara (born 7 September 1972) is a Brazilian politician serving as a member of the Legislative Assembly of Mato Grosso do Sul since 2015. From 2005 to 2012, he served as mayor of Ivinhema.
