= 1979 in Brazilian television =

This is a list of Brazilian television related events from 1979.

== Events ==
- 1 October – Emissoras Pioneiras de Televisão, best known as EPTV, is founded by José Bonifácio Coutinho Nogueira and is headquartered in Campinas.

== Debuts ==
- March 19 - Feijão Maravilha

== Television shows ==
=== 1970s ===
- Turma da Mônica (1976–present)
- Sítio do Picapau Amarelo (1977–1986)

== Networks and services ==
=== Launches ===
Network	Type	Launch date	Notes	Source
TV Tropical	Terrestrial	15 March		
NSC TV	Terrestrial	Unknown		

=== Conversions and rebrandings ===
Old network name	New network name	Type	Conversion Date	Notes	Source
TV Cultura	Rádio e Televisão Cultura	Cable and satellite	Unknown		

== Births ==
- 5 March – Érico Brás, actor, singer & comedian
- 7 March – Arlindo Lopes, actor
- 20 June – Marcos Mion, TV host, actor & entrepreneur
- 19 July – Ellen Rocche, actress & model
- 28 August – Guilherme Winter, actor
- 14 September – Ricardo Pereira, actor, model & TV host
- 22 October – Júlio Rocha, actor

== See also ==
- 1979 in Brazil
