= Jessé Lopes =

Brazilian politician (born 1982)

Member of the Legislative Assembly of Santa Catarina
- Incumbent
- Assumed office 1 February 2019

Personal details
- Born: 14 May 1982 (age 44)
- Party: Liberal Party (since 2022)

Jessé de Faria Lopes (born 14 May 1982) is a Brazilian politician serving as a member of the Legislative Assembly of Santa Catarina since 2019. He has served as chairman of the Public Security Committee since 2023.
