= Rafael Motta =

Brazilian politician (born 1986)

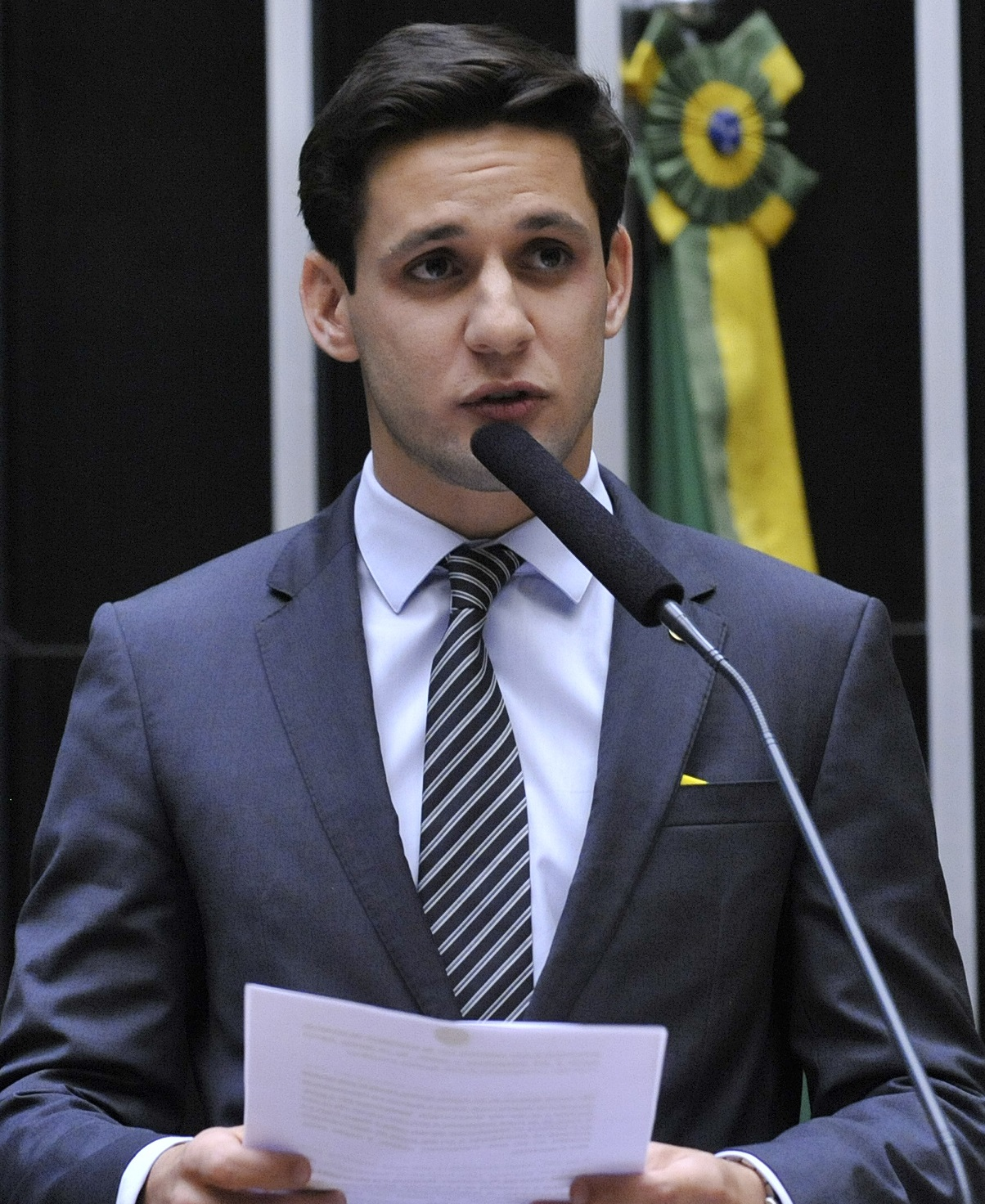
- De Toni in April 2016

Federal Deputy for Rio Grande do Norte
- Incumbent
- Assumed office 1 February 2015

Vereador of Natal
- In office 1 January 2013 – 17 December 2014

Personal details
- Born: 15 August 1986 (age 39) Natal, Rio Grande do Norte Brazil
- Party: PSB (2016–); PROS (2013–2016); PP (2012–2013)

Rafael Huete da Motta (born 15 August 1986) is a Brazilian politician and engineer. He has spent his political career representing Rio Grande do Norte, having served in the national legislature since 2015.

== Personal life ==
Motta was born to Ricardo José Meirelles da Motta and Maria Cristina Huete Meirelles da Motta. Prior to becoming a politician Motta worked as an engineer.

Motta is part of spiritualist community of Brazil. Together with Caroline de Toni and Eduardo Girão he helped pass the resolution declaring "National Day of Spiritism" as a federal holiday, which is on April 18, the date of publication of "The Book of Spirits" by Allan Kardec.

== Political career ==
In the 2014 Brazilian general election Motta was elected to the Chamber of Deputies at the age of 28 with more than 176,000 votes. In doing so he followed in the footsteps of his father, who had also elected federal deputy of Rio Grande do Norte.

In December 2015 he was expelled from the Republican Party of the Social Order for criticizing misuse of party funds. A week later Motta joined the Brazilian Socialist Party or PSB. In February 2016 Motta was elected president of the PSB for the state of Rio Grande do Norte by his party.

Motta voted in favor to the impeachment of then-president Dilma Rousseff, and was one of the strongest supporters of impeachment in the PSB party. He in favor of the tax reforms on petrol but voted in against the 2017 Brazilian labor reform, and would vote in favor of a corruption investigation into Rousseff's successor Michel Temer.
