= Maria Aparecida Pedrossian =

Brazilian socialite (1934–2022)

7th First Lady of Mato Grosso do Sul
- In office 1 March 1991 – 1 December 1994
- Preceded by: Maria Antonina Cançado Soares
- Succeeded by: Nelly Martins

3rd First Lady of Mato Grosso do Sul
- In office 29 October 1980 – 1 March 1983
- Preceded by: Maria Antonina Cançado Soares
- Succeeded by: Nelly Martins

41st First lady of Mato Grosso
- In office 31 January 1966 – 15 March 1971

Personal details
- Born: 1934
- Died: 23 December 2022 (aged 87–88) Campo Grande, Brazil
- Spouse: Pedro Pedrossian

Maria Aparecida Pedrossian (1934 – December 23, 2022) was the wife of Pedro Pedrossian and served as First Lady of Mato Grosso do Sul twice, as well as first lady of Mato Grosso once. Alongside her husband, she witnessed the development of Mato Grosso do Sul, with the construction of important works.

One of the best-known neighborhoods in Campo Grande and also the University Hospital of the Federal University of Mato Grosso do Sul are named in honour of Maria Aparecida.

== Career ==
Maria Aparecida was born in 1934.

She was orphaned at the age of 10, after her father died of cancer and her mother died of a stroke. Shortly after losing her parents she took turns at her relatives' house.

At the age of 14, after earning her work permit, she went to work as a salesperson at Lojas Brasileiras.

As she did not finish her studies, she struggled to finish her flight attendant course at 18. At the time, Pedrossian worked for Real, one of the main airlines at the time, and traveled to countries such as the United States, Argentina and Uruguay.

=== First lady ===
As first lady, Pedrossian prioritized social assistance, which became her trademark. One of the highlights was the founding of the Association of Parents and Friends of the Handicapped.

During a meeting with the governor of Mato Grosso, a student fainted from hunger. Her husband, Pedrossian, told her the story and, together with a friend, founded the students' restaurant, the student who fainted ended up becoming an employee of the Court of Auditors and deputy for Acre.

Pedrossian started to take care of the gardens in Cuiabá, Mato Grosso.

Pedrossian stayed away from politics for several years. He eventually returned in 1978 when he was elected senator. In 1980, he resigned from office to be appointed governor of Mato Grosso do Sul.

For two years, until 1982, when Wilson Barbosa Martins (MDB) was elected, she returned to dedicate herself to social work as First Lady. She said that she spent the day receiving the poor, who sought everything from food to medical treatment. Some were even sent to São Paulo.

The couple returned to power in 1991, when Pedrossian was elected governor for the 3rd time. Maria Aparecida became famous as "Maria Panelão" (Maria Panel), for distributing a basic food basket to poor families.

Seeing that the women were unable to work because they had nowhere to leave their children, Maria Aparecida asked Pedrossian to build day care centers in the neighborhoods. She says that one was built in each neighborhood of Campo Grande.

In 1982, she ended up with the Federal Police in José Elias Moreira's gubernatorial campaign. Her opponent was Wilson Martins, who had 14 July Street, the main political stage at the time, covered with the election campaign.

Pedro Pedrossian tried to return to power in 1998, when he was left out of the second round of the Government dispute, and in 2002, when he lost the seat of senator. For Maria Aparecida, her husband lost to communist parties, which invested a lot of money in the election of Zeca do PT.

== Personal life ==
At the age of 21 she met Pedro Pedrossian for the first time at Praça das Sé, in São Paulo.

Maria Aparecida married Pedro Pedrossian in 1948, with their marriage they had six children, including Pedro Pedrossian Filho, 11 grandchildren, including Pedro Pedrossian Neto and 12 great-grandchildren.

For years, the couple ended up living in cities in the interior of São Paulo, such as Lins, Araçatuba and Bauru.

In 2017, Maria Aparecida became the widow of Pedro Pedrossian after his death. The two were married for 69 years.

== Health and death ==
On December 21, 2022, she was intubated after suffering a heart attack, she had already undergone catheterization and angioplasty.

On December 23, 2022, Maria Aparecida Pedrossian died in the morning at the age of 88.

Her wake took place at 1 pm on the same day, at the Parque das Primaveras cemetery and the burial took place at 4:30 pm.
