= José Fritsch =

Brazilian politician (born 1954)

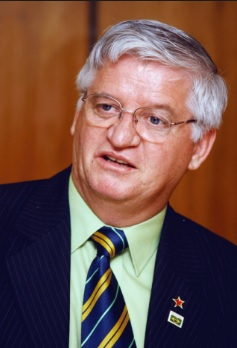

Special Secretary of Fishing and Aquaculture
- In office 1 January 2003 – 31 March 2006
- Preceded by: Office established
- Succeeded by: Altemir Gregolin

Mayor of Chapecó
- In office 1 January 1997 – 5 April 2002
- Preceded by: Aldi Berdian
- Succeeded by: Pedro Uczai

State deputy of Santa Catarina
- In office 1 February 1995 – 31 December 1996

Personal details
- Born: 6 August 1954 (age 71) Ipumirim, Santa Catarina, Brazil
- Party: PT (1983–present)

José Fritsch (born 6 August 1954) is a Brazilian teacher and politician who served as the first minister of the Ministry of Fishing and Aquaculture from 2003 to 2006. Before being minister, he was the mayor of the city of Chapecó and served as a state deputy in his home state of Santa Catarina. He is a long-time member of the Workers' Party (PT).

Fritsch was born in the western part of Santa Catarina to small-scale farmers. He moved to Chapecó at 12 years old, where he studied at the Diocesan Seminary. He is married and has four children. He graduated with a degree in social studies from University of West Santa Catarina (Unoesc), and later took courses in philosophy and public policy in Germany. While in Florianópolis, he participated in the founding of the Comissão Pastoral da Terra (CPT), while also helping to establish the Central Única dos Trabalhadores (CUT) in the mid-1970s. In the 1980s, he worked with the landless workers' movement.

In 1994, he was elected a state deputy in Santa Catarina. In 1996, he was elected as the mayor of Chapecó, and was reelected in 2000. He resigned from office in 2002 to run to become the governor of Santa Catarina, but did not advance into the second round. He was succeeded as mayor by Pedro Uczai. He would run again in 2006, but would again not advance to the second round. He became the first minister of the Ministry of Fishing and Aquaculture at the invite of president Luiz Inácio Lula da Silva in late 2002.
