= 1982 in Brazilian television =

This is a list of Brazilian television related events from 1982.

== Debuts ==
- October 11 - Sol de Verão

== Television shows ==
=== 1970s ===
- Turma da Mônica (1976–present)
- Sítio do Picapau Amarelo (1977–1986)

== Births ==
- 17 February - Mariana Weickert, model & TV host
- 22 March - Daniel Erthal, actor & model
- 14 April - Paolla Oliveira, actress
- 7 June - Bruno Freitas, actor & TV host
- 20 October - Roberta Rodrigues, actress

== See also ==
- 1982 in Brazil
- List of Brazilian films of 1982
