= Henrique Córdova =

Brazilian politician (1938–2020)

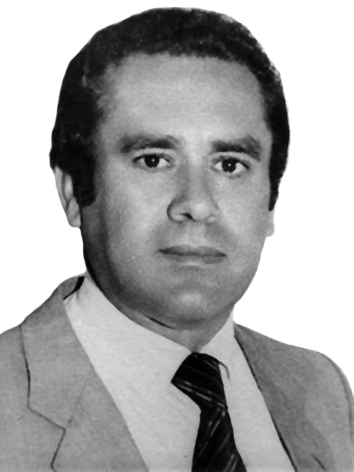

Governor of Santa Catarina
- In office 14 May 1982 – 15 March 1983
- Preceded by: Jorge Bornhausen
- Succeeded by: Esperidião Amin

Personal details
- Born: 21 December 1938 São Joaquim, Brazil
- Died: 15 November 2020 (aged 81) Lages, Brazil
- Political party: PDS

Henrique Córdova (21 December 1938 – 15 November 2020) was a Brazilian politician. He served as Governor of Santa Catarina from 1982 to 1983. He also served as a member of the Chamber of Deputies 1986 to 1991 and 1975 to 1979, as well as the Legislative Assembly of Santa Catarina from 1967 to 1975.

== Biography ==
Vice-Governor during Jorge Bornhausen's leadership, Córdova succeeded him in 1982 following his resignation. He helped to improve the national standing of Santa Catarina, which earned him recognition in Brasília.

Cordova died from COVID-19 in November 2020, aged 83.
