= Carlos Chiodini =

Brazilian politician (born 1982)

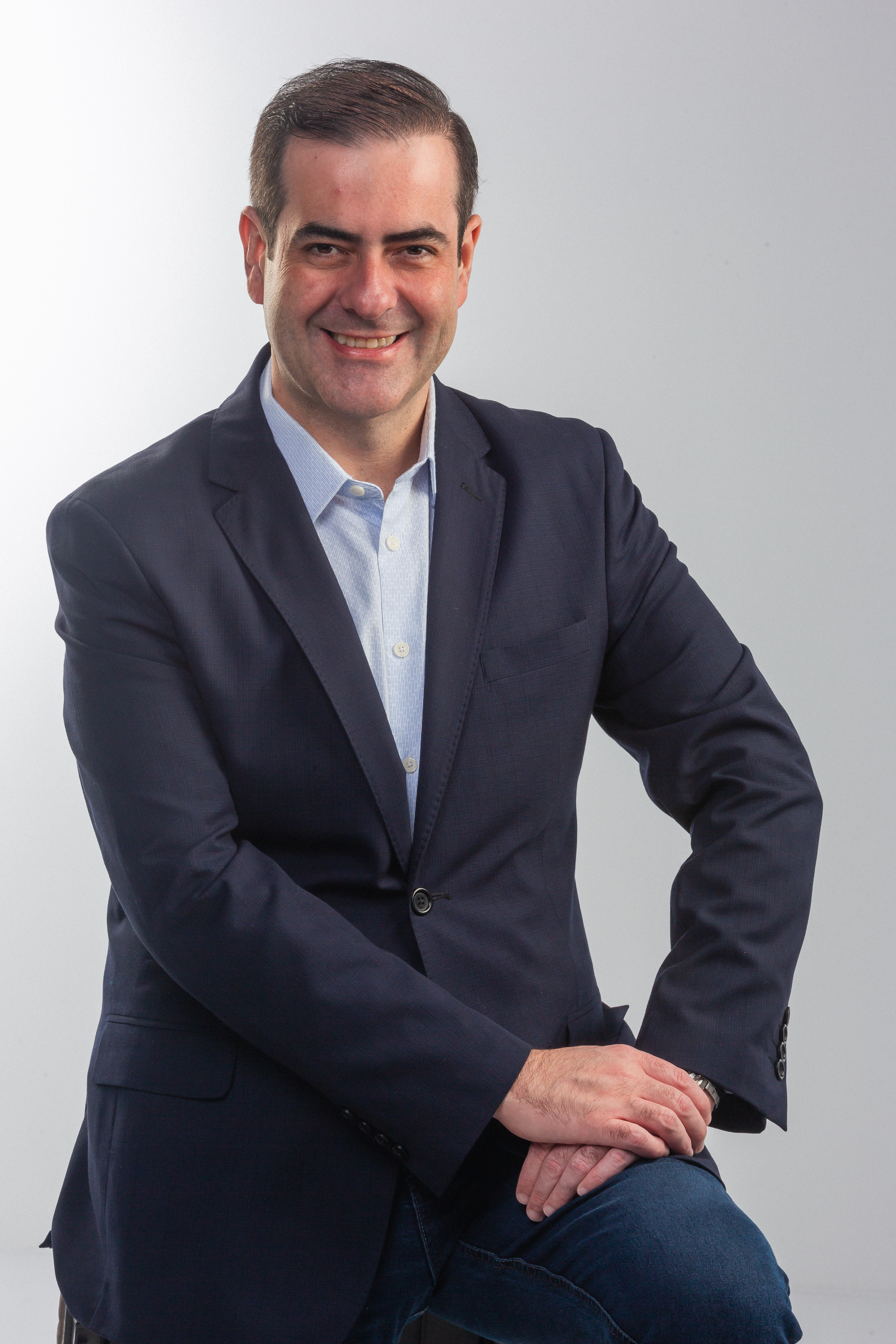
- Chiodini in 2022

Member of the Chamber of Deputies
- Incumbent
- Assumed office 1 February 2019
- Constituency: Santa Catarina

Personal details
- Born: 8 March 1982 (age 44)
- Party: Brazilian Democratic Movement (since 1999)

Carlos Alberto Chiodini (born 8 March 1982) is a Brazilian politician serving as a member of the Chamber of Deputies since 2019. He was a member of the Legislative Assembly of Santa Catarina from June to August 2008, from 2009 to 2010, and from 2011 to 2015.
