= Coisas Eróticas =

- Theatrical release poster
- Directed by: Raffaele Rossi; Laerte Calicchio
- Screenplay by: Raffaele Rossi
- Starring: Zaíra Bueno; Oasis Minniti; Jussara Calmon; Walder Laurentis; Marília Nauê
- Production company: Empresa Cinematográfica Rossi
- Release date: 7 July 1982
- Running time: 83 minutes
- Language: Portuguese

Coisas Eróticas (lit. 'Erotic Things') is a 1982 Brazilian pornographic film. Composed of three episodes, it was directed by Raffaele Rossi and Laerte Calicchio. Released during the military dictatorship, it is considered the first explicit sex film produced in Brazil and remains one of the highest-grossing films in the history of Brazilian cinema, with more than 20 million viewers. In 1984, a sequel titled Coisas Eróticas II was released.

== Plot ==
After masturbating in the bathroom while leafing through an erotic magazine, Eduardo meets a beautiful mulatto model at a traffic light, who invites him to spend a weekend at her farm. Once there, Eduardo has sex with the model, while Arlete, her daughter, and her friend masturbate each other.

== Cast ==
- Jussara Calmon as Model
- Oasis Minniti as Eduardo
- Zaíra Bueno as Laura
- Ilse Cotrin as Arlete
- Walter Laurentis as Betinho
- Marly Paluaro
- Marília Nauê as Wife
- Ariadne de Lima

== Production ==
Director Raffaele Rossi was born in Sant'Arsenio, Italy, and arrived in Brazil at the age of 16, where he began working as a cinema projectionist. In the mid-1960s, he founded a small film production company, Companhia Cinematográfica Pindorama, with his friend Inrineu Travallini (a.k.a. Toni Cardi), and later created another, Panther's Cine Som. His film career became associated with Boca do Lixo, a stronghold of Brazilian underground cinema, where he shot some successful films at the box office, but largely ignored by mainstream critics, such as Pura Como Um Anjo... Será Virgem? (1976) and Roberta, A Moderna Gueixa do Sexo (1978).

With the release of the film In the Realm of the Senses (1976) in Brazil under the military dictatorship in 1980, Rossi saw the opportunity to release a sexually explicit film, which he produced with Laerte Calicchio.

== Release ==
After the film surprisingly obtained a general release certificate from censorship, it was released at the Cine Windsor in São Paulo on July 7, 1982.

== Reception ==
=== Box office ===
The film is one of the biggest box office hits in the history of Brazilian cinema, with more than 20 million viewers.

=== Critical response ===
Like all of Rossi's films, it was ignored by mainstream critics at the time, and his work was only rediscovered decades later by cinephiles, critics and researchers of Brazilian cinema and the Boca do Lixo phenomenon.

Sérgio Alpendre in his review for Cinema in July 2012 said that the film is "a byproduct of Boca [do Lixo] that wouldn't have the slightest chance of attracting attention if it weren't for the long scenes of explicit sex [...] it seems like a sad experiment made by people with little talent, which by some irony of fate exploded in Brazilian cinemas." In a review published in January 2016 by Thiago Sgrili, he concludes that "Coisas Eróticas is a bizarre and very strange film. It's more of a comedy than an erotic film, as the name suggests."
