= Ana Carolina (director) =

Brazilian film director

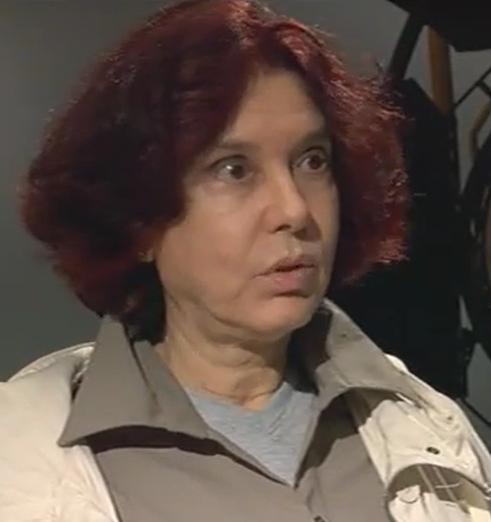
- Born: 27 September 1943 (age 82); São Paulo, Brazil
- Other name: Ana Carolina Teixeira Soares
- Occupations: Film director, screenwriter
- Years active: 1969–2014

Ana Carolina (born 27 September 1945) is a Brazilian film director and screenwriter. She directed seven films between 1969 and 2003. In 1978, she was a member of the jury at the 28th Berlin International Film Festival. Her 1982 film Heart and Guts was screened in the Un Certain Regard section at the 1982 Cannes Film Festival.

== Early career and documentary work ==
Ana Carolina Teixeira Soares attended school with the intention of becoming a doctor, but instead changed direction and became a filmmaker. She graduated in 1964 from University of São Paulo Med School. Several years later she went to a School of Physiotherapy, taking special interest in university politics. She also spent a few of her early years in a Renaissance band called "Musikantiga".

She was highly focused in her early years as a filmmaker, as she made 11 documentaries in her first eight years in the business (her first being in 1967, last in 1974).

These early documentaries had a heavy focus on workers. Ana Carolina also had interest in the world of labour, as she created several documentaries that revolved around labourers and unions (Lavra-dor 1968, Pantanal 1971). At the same time, some of these documentaries focused more on artistic practices (Três Desenhos 1970, Monteiro Lobato 1970).

== Feature films ==
She is better known for her feature films, however. Her earliest works includes a trilogy that consists of films that all speak to social and political conditions in Brazil, her place of birth. They were supported by Embrafilme. Despite the common connection that they all speak to the conditions surrounding her in Brazil, these films all present themselves in very different ways.

Her first film released in 1977 was titled Mar de Rosas, translated into Everything is Fine. The film is shot from a feminist perspective with interpretations open to the viewer. Mar de Rosas tells the story of a woman that slits her husband's throat and flees with her child. It provides commentary on patriarchy and feminist discontent. This discontent is not strictly limited to the characters within the fictional landscape and speaks much more broadly to the nation at whole.

Her second film, Das Tripas Caração (1982) – which translates into With the Heart in the Hands- is an off-beat film that examines sexual interactions as well as homophobia. It depicts a male detective's perverse dreams that include intervention in lesbian relationships and impregnating a female teacher. As described in Women Film Directors, "Carolina’s work is, in some ways, comparable to Pedro Almodovar's, but Carolina’s use of camp horror is that of a distinctly feminist lens".

The final film in the trilogy is titled Sonho de Valsa (1986) – which translates into Dream Waltz. The protagonist in the film is a female, named Tereza, that has chaotic dreams of a Prince Charming dressed in medieval costume. It continues on Carolina's theme of sexual examination, and does so particularly by her interactions with the male role models in her life.

== Carolina's take on her work ==
In an interview based on audacity in cinema, Carolina had much to say in regards to the censorship she faced in her time making films in Brazil. She uses words such as hysterical and neurotic to describe the impact it had on her production of films. She claims that the limitations placed on her work actually caused her to be more rebellious and this influenced her work to be even more provocative. She goes on to admit that her work in Mar de Rosas is meant to be interpreted as an allusion to the outside world.

== Impact ==
Carolina had a highly influential role as a filmmaker in one of the most restrictive times in Brazil, the Military Dictatorship (1964–1985). Her battle against censorship trail-blazed a better path to social and political commentary in film. She fought against the censorship of films, but also the censorship of ideas.

== Filmography ==
- Indústria (1969)
- Getúlio Vargas (1974)
- Mar de Rosas (1977)
- Das Tripas Coração (1982)
- Sonho de Valsa (1987)
- Amélia (2001)
- Gregório de Mattos (2003)
- A Primeira Missa (2014)

== Awards and nominations ==
- Amélia (2001) was nominated for Best Actress at the Grande Premio do Cinema Brasileiro.
- Amélia (2001) was nominated for Best Screenplay at the Grande Premio do Cinema Brasileiro.
- Amélia (2001) was nominated for Best Art Direction at the Grande Premio do Cinema Brasileiro.
- Jury member at 28th International Berlin Film Festival
