= Heart and Guts =

1982 film

- Theatrical release poster
- Directed by: Ana Carolina
- Written by: Ana Carolina
- Produced by: Jacques Eluf; Veze Zahram
- Starring: Antônio Fagundes; Dina Sfat; Xuxa Lopes
- Cinematography: Antonio Luiz Mendes
- Edited by: Roberto Gervitz
- Music by: Paulo Herculano
- Production company: Crystal Cinematográfica
- Distributed by: Embrafilme
- Release dates: May 1982 (Cannes); October 1982 (Brazil)
- Running time: 100 minutes
- Country: Brazil
- Language: Portuguese

Heart and Guts (Portuguese: Das Tripas Coração) is a 1982 Brazilian comedy film directed by Ana Carolina. It was screened in the Un Certain Regard section at the 1982 Cannes Film Festival.

== Plot ==
A boarding school only for girls is decreed to be closed by the state. An intervenor, Guido (Antônio Fagundes), is sent to the school to sign the protocol to confirm its closure and says it will become a corporation. Unexpectedly the students start to have sex, as well as the janitors and truancy officers. Meanwhile, each of the two principals, Renata (Dina Sfat) and Miriam (Xuxa Lopes), create obstacles to the other as both want Guido exclusively for herself. In the end, however, Guido finds out everything was just a dream and confirms the school's closure.

== Cast ==
- Antônio Fagundes as Guido
- Dina Sfat as Renata
- Xuxa Lopes as Miriam
- Ney Latorraca as priest
- Christiane Torloni as teacher
- Eduardo Tornaghi
- Othon Bastos
- Cristina Pereira as Amindra
- Myrian Muniz as Muniza
- Nair Bello as Nair
