= Dina Sfat =

Brazilian actress

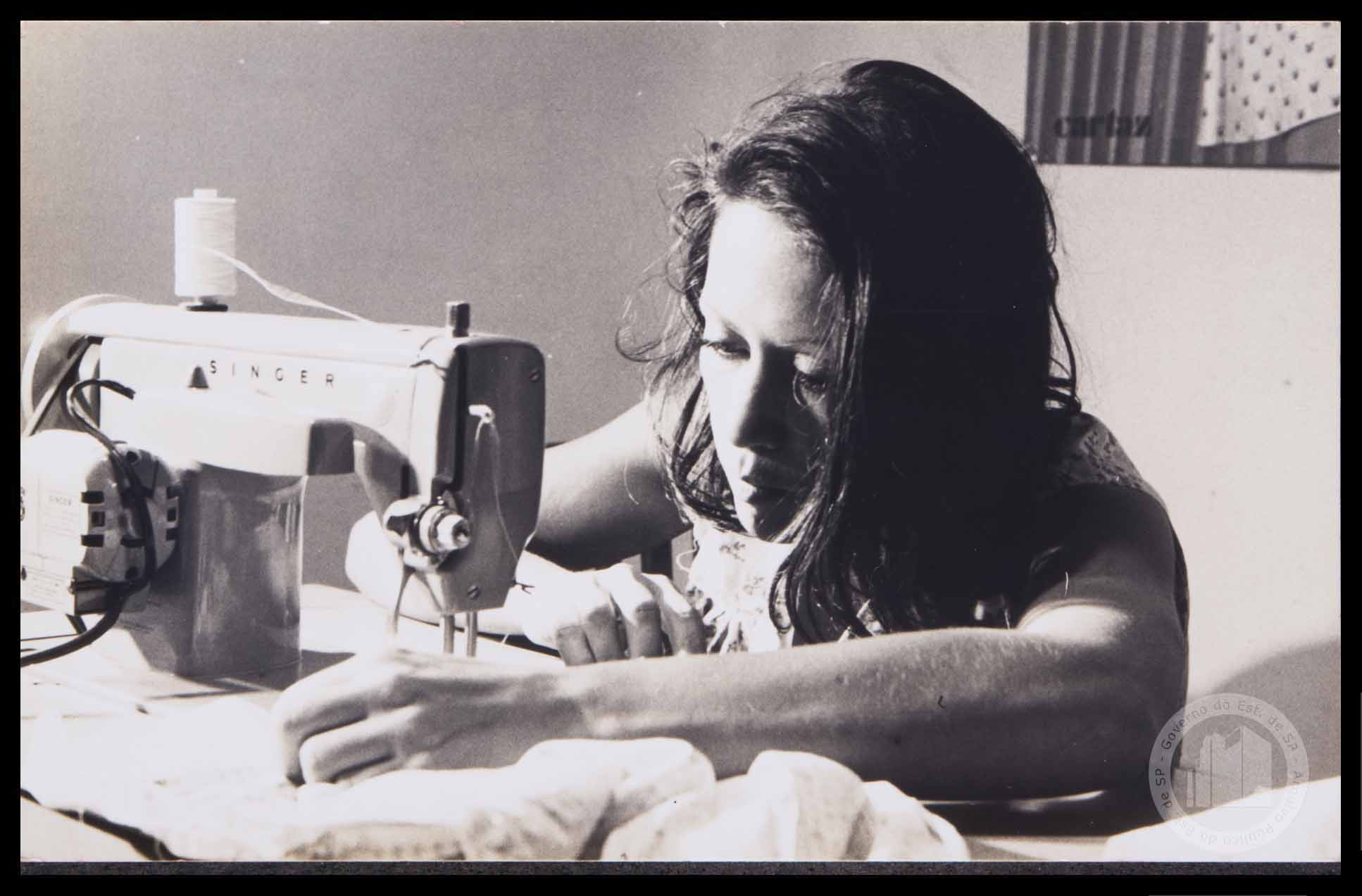
- Born: 28 October 1938; São Paulo, Brazil
- Died: 20 March 1989 (aged 50); Rio de Janeiro, Brazil
- Occupation: Actress
- Years active: 1966–1989

Dina Sfat, born Dina Kutner (28 October 1938 – 20 March 1989) was a Brazilian actress born to Polish Jewish immigrants. She appeared in 46 films and television shows between 1966 and 1989. Sfat was married to actor Paulo José with whom she had three daughters including actresses Bel Kutner and Ana Kutner. She also participated in 19 theater performances from 1963 to 1986. Additionally, Sfat appeared in 16 TV soap operas from 1966 to 1988, the last one called Baby on Board, transmitted by TV Globo.

== Selected filmography ==
- Macunaíma (1969)
- Tati (1973)
- Heart and Guts (1982)
