= Harry Amorim Costa =

Brazilian politician (1927–1988)

His Excellency Harry Amorim Costa
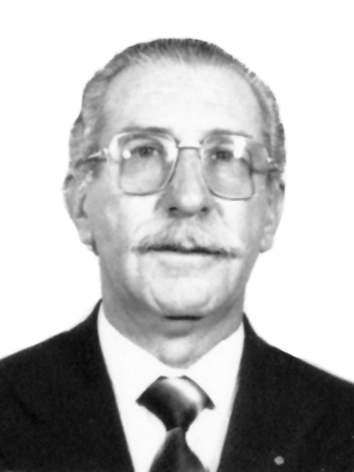

Governor of Mato Grosso do Sul
- In office 1 January 1979 – 12 June 1979
- Succeeded by: Londres Machado

Federal deputy for Mato Grosso do Sul
- In office 1 February 1983 – 31 January 1986

4th Secretary of State for the Environment of Mato Grosso do Sul
- In office 15 March 1987 – 19 August 1988
- Governor: Marcelo Miranda Soares
- Preceded by: Abel Costa de Oliveira
- Succeeded by: Nilson de Barros

Personal details
- Born: Harry Amorim Costa; 23 May 1927 Cruz Alta, Rio Grande do Sul, Brazil
- Died: August 19, 1988 (aged 61) Miranda, Mato Grosso do Sul, Brazil
- Party: MDB
- Spouse: Amélia Santana
- Education: University of Rio Grande do Sul

Harry Amorim Costa (23 May 1927 – 19 August 1988) was the first Governor of Mato Grosso do Sul, when the state was created during the government of President Ernesto Geisel.

In 1982, he was elected federal deputy for the PMDB, then the main opposition party to the government of João Figueiredo. He was unable to be re-elected in 1986, and was appointed Secretary of State for the Environment in 1987. He would die in 1988 in a car accident.

== Biography ==
Born in the state of Rio Grande do Sul, Costa was the son of José Zacarias Costa and Araci Amorim Costa. He received his education at the Escola de Engenharia (Engineering School) of the Universidade do Rio Grande do Sul, which was followed by courses in pavement and soil mechanics at the Road Research Institute in Porto Alegre (1954) and the Institute for Technological Research in São Paulo (1956). As early as 1950 he was working as an engineer for the independent authority Departamento Nacional de Obras de Saneamento (DNOS). In 1974 he became Director General of DNOS, having previously held several successful managerial positions in the field of public works and sanitation.

== Political career ==
On March 28, 1978, the President of Brazil, Ernesto Geisel (1974–1979) appointed Harry Amorim Costa as the first governor of the newly created state of Mato Grosso do Sul. The nomination was approved by the federal Senate the following March 29. Appointed by a decree signed by President Geisel on March 31, he left the post of Director General of DNOS the following May and was sworn in for a four-year term on January 1, 1979. He was politically inexperienced, made administrative mistakes and, without his own base, faced opposition from the most powerful national leaders of the Aliança Renovadora Nacional (ARENA) in Mato Grosso do Sul, who would have preferred to see a governor from Mato Grosso. After five months and eleven days in office, he was released early on June 12, 1979 by President João Figueiredo.

He joined the Movimento Democrático Brasileiro (PMDB) party, then the main opposition party against the government of João Figueiredo. In the 1982 elections in Brazil, he was elected to the Chamber of Deputies of the National Congress for the PMDB as a federal deputy for Mato Grosso do Sul. Here he stayed for one legislature. His candidacy for re-election in 1986 was unsuccessful.

On March 15, 1987, he was appointed fourth Secretary of State for the Environment (Secretário de Estado do Meio Ambiente de Mato Grosso do Sul) by Governor Marcelo Miranda.

On August 19, 1988 he died in a car accident. He was married to Amélia Santana Costa and had six children.

== Aftermath ==
In Campo Grande there is a monument in the Parque das Nações Indígenas, a bronze bust was made, a municipal school and a district are named after him.
