= Caroline de Toni =

Brazilian politician

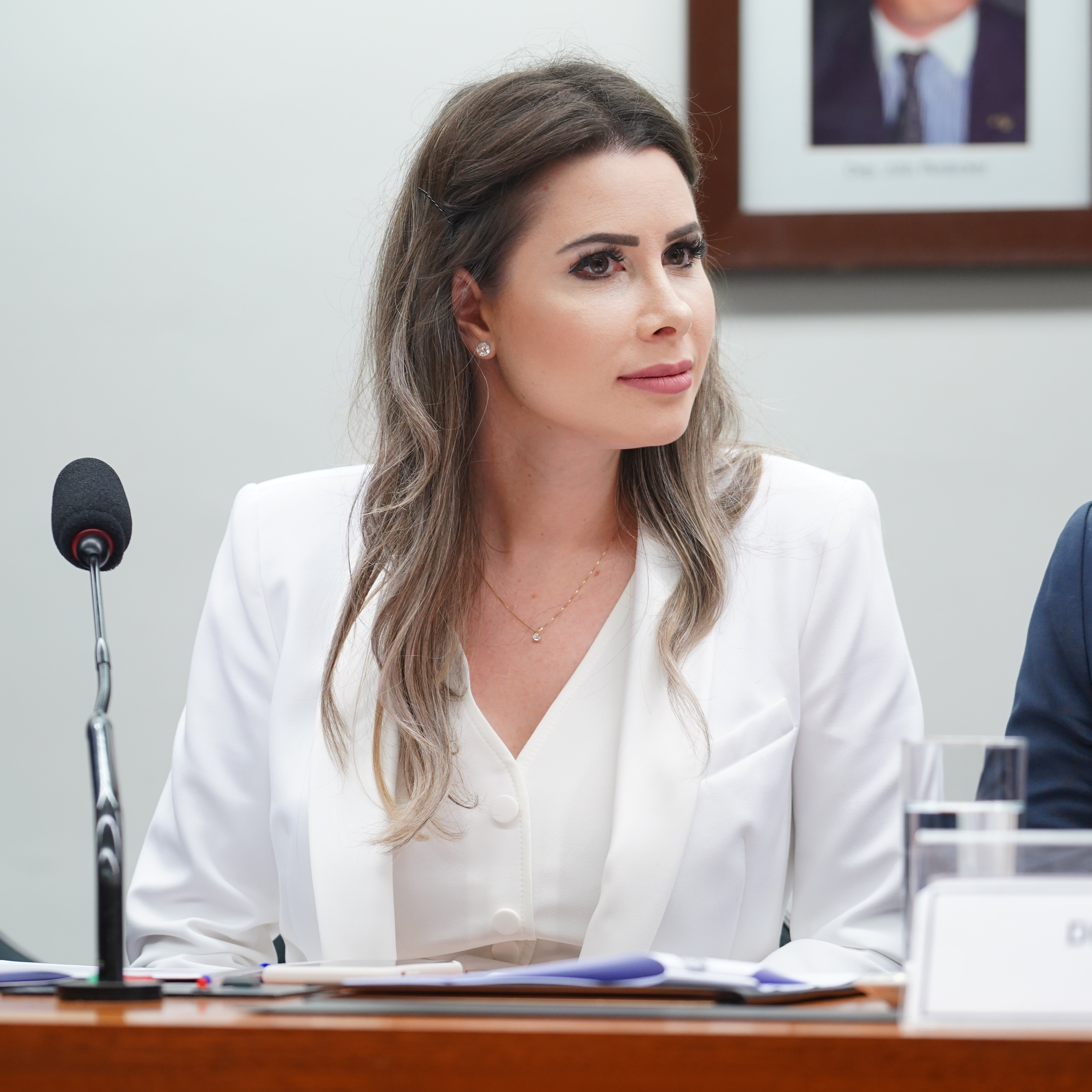

Senator-elect for Santa Catarina
- Assuming office 1 February 2027

Member of the Chamber of Deputies
- Incumbent
- Assumed office 1 February 2019
- Constituency: Santa Catarina

Personal details
- Born: 11 April 1986 (age 40) Chapecó, Santa Catarina, Brazil
- Party: PL (since 2022)
- Other political affiliations: PP (2016–2018); PSL (2018–2022); UNIÃO (2022)
- Profession: Lawyer

Caroline Rodrigues de Toni (born 1 September 1986) is a Brazilian politician and lawyer. She has spent her political career representing Santa Catarina, having served in the state legislature since 2019.

== Personal life ==
De Toni graduated with a degree in law from the Community University of the Chapecó Region (Unochapecó) and earned a master's degree in public law from Estácio de Sá University.

De Toni is part of spiritualist community of Brazil. Together with Rafael Motta and Eduardo Girão she helped pass the resolution declaring "National Day of Spiritism" as a federal holiday, which is on April 18, the date of publication of "The Book of Spirits" by Allan Kardec.

== Political career ==
In 2016 De Toni was elected to the council of her hometown of Chapecó with 1,589 votes or 1.47% of the total ballot. She served from 2016 to 2018 representing the Progressive Party. In 2018 she joined the Social Liberal Party, becoming the vice-leader for the party chapter in Santa Catarina. In the 2018 Brazilian general elections she was elected to the lower house of the legislative assembly with 109, 363 being the most voted female candidate in the state.
