= Londres Machado =

His Excellency Londres Machado
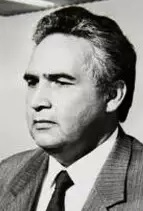

State deputy for Mato Grosso do Sul
- Incumbent
- Assumed office 1 February 2019
- In office 1 January 1979 – 31 January 2015

First Gentleman of Fátima do Sul
- Incumbent
- Assumed office 1 January 2017
- In office 1 January 2005 – 31 December 2012

Governor of Mato Grosso do Sul (interim)
- In office 28 October 1980 – 7 November 1980
- Preceded by: Marcelo Miranda Soares
- Succeeded by: Pedro Pedrossian
- In office 13 June 1979 – 30 June 1979
- Preceded by: Harry Amorim Costa
- Succeeded by: Marcelo Miranda Soares

Personal details
- Born: 3 February 1942 (age 84) Rio Brilhante, Mato Grosso do Sul
- Party: ARENA; PDS; PFL; PST; PSDB; PL; PR; PSD
- Spouse: Ilda Salgado

Londres Machado (born 3 February 1942) is a politician who holds the record for consecutive electoral victories in Brazil, having been re-elected since 1971. He served as state deputy and twice acting governor of Mato Grosso do Sul.

== Career ==
His first terms as a state deputy came in the 1970 and 1974 elections in the former state of Mato Grosso. In his second term, he served as first secretary of the Board of Directors of the Assembly.

With the creation of the state of Mato Grosso do Sul, he was elected state deputy for the four-year period 1979/1983 and assumed the presidency of the Constituent State Assembly, from which he left twice: on June 13, 1979 and on October 28, 1980, to be the interim governor of Mato Grosso do Sul.

In the subsequent mandate (1983/1987), the deputy occupied the second secretariat of the Board of Directors of the Legislative Assembly of Mato Grosso do Sul and, in the biennium 1985/1986, assumed the first secretariat of the Assembly.

Re-elected (1987/1991), Machado initially occupied, in the period 1987/1988, the head of the Civil House of Governor Marcelo Miranda Soares. And, in the biennium 1989/1990, he returned to the Assembly as president of the Board of Directors, accumulating the position of president of the Constituent Assembly.

Re-elected for the 1991/1995, 1995/1999, 1999/2003, 2003/2007, 2007/2011 and 2011/2015 legislatures, he became the longest- serving Brazilian state deputy in office. He was Speaker of the State Assembly, further, in 1991/1992, 1996/1998, 1998/2000 and 2004 /2006.
