= Pedro Pedrossian =

Brazilian politician (1928–2017)

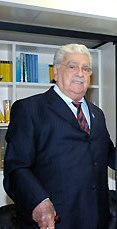
- Pedrossian in 2010

7th Governor of Mato Grosso do Sul
- In office 1 March 1991 – 1 December 1994
- Preceded by: Marcelo Miranda Soares
- Succeeded by: Wilson Barbosa Martins

3rd Governor of Mato Grosso do Sul
- In office 29 October 1980 – 1 March 1983
- Preceded by: Londres Machado
- Succeeded by: Wilson Barbosa Martins

41st Governor of Mato Grosso
- In office 31 January 1966 – 15 March 1971
- Preceded by: Fernando Correa da Costa
- Succeeded by: José Fragelli

Personal details
- Born: 13 August 1928 Miranda, Mato Grosso do Sul, Brazil
- Died: 22 August 2017 (aged 89) Campo Grande, Brazil
- Party: PMN (2009-2017); MDB (2003-2009); PST (2001-2003); PDT (1999-2001); PTB (1985-1999); PDS (1980-1985); ARENA (1965-1980); PSD (-1965)
- Spouse: Maria Aparecida Pedrossian
- Education: Mackenzie Presbyterian University
- Occupation: Civil engineer

Pedro Pedrossian (13 August 1928 – 22 August 2017) was a Brazilian politician. A member of the Party of National Mobilization, he served two terms as the Governor of Mato Grosso do Sul. The first term (1980–83) was an appointed role, before being elected to office in 1991. His term ended in 1994. He also served as the governor of Mato Grosso between 1966 and 1971. He was born in Miranda, Mato Grosso do Sul. A civil engineer by profession, he graduated from Mackenzie Presbyterian University, São Paulo.

Pedrossian died on 22 August 2017 in Campo Grande, at the age of 89.
