= Jânio Natal Júnior =

Brazilian politician (born 1982)

Member of the Legislative Assembly of Bahia
- Incumbent
- Assumed office 1 February 2027

Personal details
- Born: 11 June 1982 (age 44)
- Party: Liberal Party
- Parent: Jânio Natal (father)

Jânio Natal Júnior (born 11 June 1982) is a Brazilian politician who was elected member of the Legislative Assembly of Bahia in 2026. He is the son of Jânio Natal.
