= João Rodrigues (politician) =

Brazilian politician (born 1967)

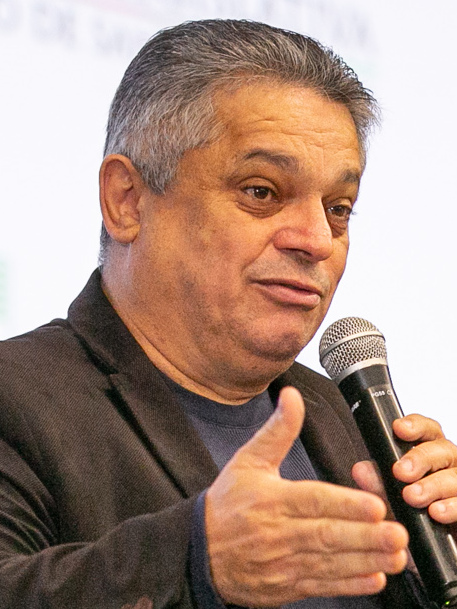
- Rodrigues in 2022

Member of the Chamber of Deputies
- In office 1 February 2011 – 31 January 2019
- Constituency: Santa Catarina

Personal details
- Born: 23 March 1967 (age 59)
- Party: Social Democratic Party (since 2011)

João Rodrigues (born 23 March 1967) is a Brazilian politician. He has served as mayor of Chapecó since 2021, having previously served from 2005 to 2010. From 2011 to 2019, he was a member of the Chamber of Deputies.
