= Legislative Assembly of Mato Grosso do Sul =

Legislative Assembly of Mato Grosso do Sul Assembleia Legislativa de Mato Grosso do Sul
- 12th legislature

Type
- Type: Unicameral

Leadership
- President: Gerson Claro, PP since 1 February 2023
- 1st VP: Renato Câmara, MDB
- Government Leader: Londres Machado, PP

Structure
- Political groups: PL (6) PSDB (4) Republicanos (4) PT (3) PP (3) MDB (1) UNIAO (1) NOVO (1) Avante (1)

Elections
- Voting system: Proportional representation
- Last election: 2 October 2022
- Next election: 2026

Meeting place
- Palácio Guaicurus, Campo Grande, Mato Grosso do Sul

Website
- www.al.ms.gov.br

Footnotes

The Legislative Assembly of Mato Grosso do Sul (Portuguese: Assembleia Legislativa de Mato Grosso do Sul) is the legislative body of the government of the state of Mato Grosso do Sul in Brazil.

Governed by the 1969 Constitution, the ALMS came from the first Constituent State Assembly of Mato Grosso do Sul, created on January 1, 1979 by the then president of the republic Ernesto Geisel, as part of complementary law 31, which dismembered the southern portion from the state of Mato Grosso to create a new state. On June 13, 1979, the state constitution was enacted, which gave the house its current name.

Years later, following the determination of the Federal Constitution of 1988, the Legislative Assembly, invested with Constituent Power, elaborated the second Magna Carta, promulgated on October 5, 1989. From the foundation until today there were 10 legislatures, with 18 parliamentarians at the beginning and since the second legislature there are 24.

== Legislatures ==
- 1st Legislature: 1979–1983
- 2nd Legislature: 1983–1987
- 3rd Legislature: 1987–1991
- 4th Legislature: 1991–1995
- 5th Legislature: 1995–1999
- 6th Legislature: 1999–2003
- 7th Legislature: 2003–2007
- 8th Legislature: 2007–2011
- 9th Legislature: 2011–2015
- 10th Legislature: 2015–2019
- 11th Legislature: 2019–2023
- 12th Legislature 2023–2027
