= Jorge Bornhausen =

Brazilian politician

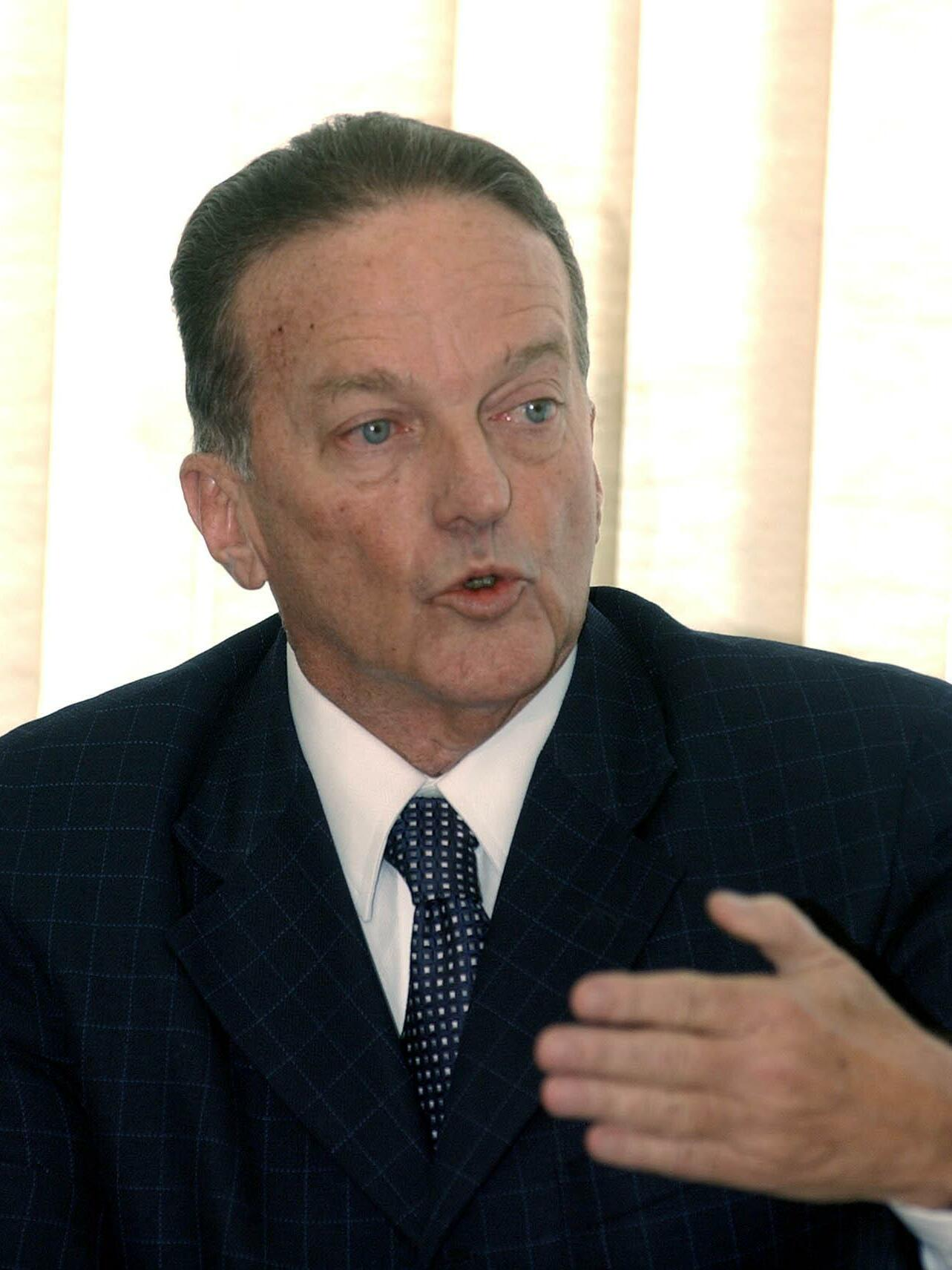
- Jorge Bornhausen, 2004

Senator for Santa Catarina
- In office 1 February 1999 – 1 February 2007
- In office 1 February 1983 – 1 February 1991

Ministry of Education
- In office 14 February 1986 – 6 October 1987
- President: José Sarney
- Preceded by: Marco Maciel
- Succeeded by: Aloísio Guimarães Sotero

Governor of Santa Catarina
- In office 15 March 1979 – 14 May 1982
- Vice Governor: Henrique Córdova
- Preceded by: Antônio Carlos Konder Reis
- Succeeded by: Henrique Córdova

Vice Governor of Santa Catarina
- In office 9 March 1967 – 15 March 1971
- Governor: Ivo Silveira
- Preceded by: Francisco Dall'Igna
- Succeeded by: Atílio Fontana

Personal details
- Born: August 1, 1937 (age 88)
- Party: Independent (Since 2011)
- Other political affiliations: Arena (1965–1980); PDS (1980–1985); PFL (1985–2007); DEM (2007–2011)
- Occupation: Brazilian politician

Jorge Bornhausen (Rio de Janeiro, October 1, 1937) is a Brazilian politician. He was governor of the state of Santa Catarina from 1979 to 1982, and senator for Santa Catarina from 1983 to 1991 and from 1999 to 2007. He was also President of the Democrats party (DEM, formerly known as 'Liberal Front Party').

== Career ==
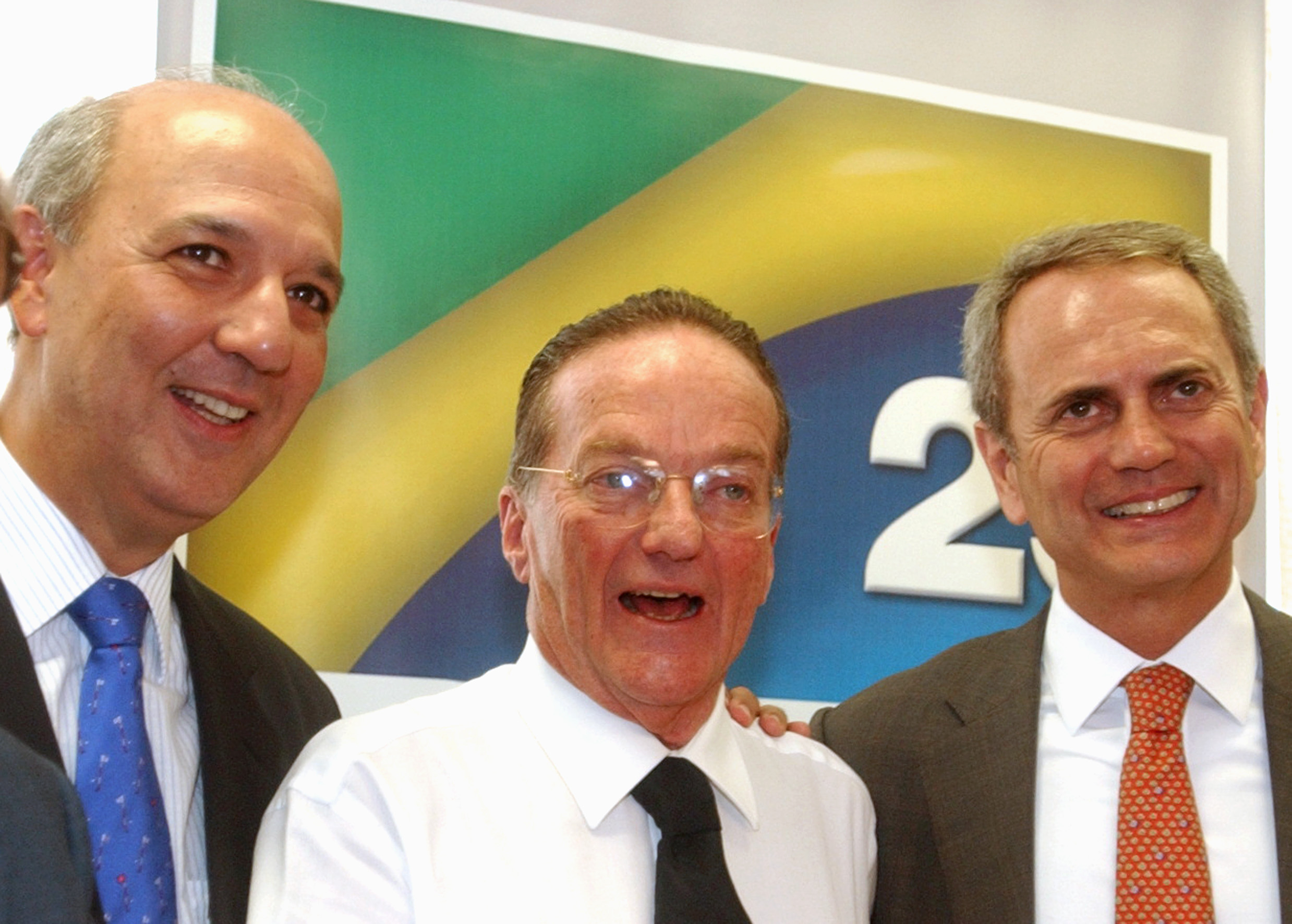
Jorge Bornhausen (in the middle) in 2006

Bornhausen received a law degree at the Pontifical Catholic University of Rio de Janeiro in 1960. After college, he went to work at the Bank of Industry and Commerce (Inco), where his father was the majority shareholder.

In 1967, Bornhausen entered politics when was appointed Lieutenant Governor by the National Renewal Alliance (ARENA). He was president of ARENA from 1972 to 1975, president of Banco do Estado de Santa Catarina until 1978, and then was appointed to the Santa Catarina Legislative Assembly where he served until 1982.

At the end of his legislative term. Bornhausen was elected senator for the Social Democratic Party, the successor to ARENA. The following year he participated in the founding of the Liberal Front Party (FPL), and was elected president.

In the private sector, Bornhausen is a member of the Advisory Council of Industries Chapecó and Mercedes-Benz in Brazil.
