= Marcelo Miranda Soares =

Brazilian politician (1938–2026)

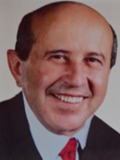

Marcelo Miranda Soares (1 December 1938 – 23 June 2026) was a Brazilian politician, affiliated with the Brazilian Democratic Movement Party (PMDB). In 1976 he was elected mayor of Campo Grande. In 1979 he was named governor of Mato Grosso do Sul, staying in the position until the following year. In 1982 he was elected senator. In 1986 he was elected governor of Mato Grosso do Sul.

Miranda Soares was born on 1 December 1938. He was superintendent of the National Department of Transport Infrastructure in Mato Grosso do Sul, between 2003 and 2012, when he was fired for not "observing the legal and regulatory norms" and "bringing to the attention of the higher authority the irregularities that he was aware of due to the cargo", after an investigation showed a change in quantities measured on road sections in conservation and maintenance contracts with contractors, which would have caused, according to the investigation, damage to public coffers.

Miranda Soares died from multiple organ failure complicated by pneumonia on 23 June 2026, at the age of 87.
