= Legislative Assembly of Santa Catarina =

Legislative assembly of the state of Santa Catarina, Brazil

Coordinates: 27°36′11″S 48°32′52″W

Legislative Assembly of Santa Catarina Assembleia Legislativa de Santa Catarina

Type
- Type: Unicameral

Structure
- Seats: 40
- Political groups: Government (32): PL (11); MDB (6); PSD (3); PODE (3); PP (3); UNIÃO (3); Republicanos (1); NOVO (1); PTB (1); Opposition (6): PT (4); PSOL (1); PDT (1); Independent (2): PSDB (2)
- Length of term: 4 years

Elections
- Voting system: Open list proportional representation
- Last election: 4 October 2026
- Next election: 7 October 2030

Meeting place
- Palácio Barriga Verde, Florianópolis

Website
- www.alesc.sc.gov.br

The Legislative Assembly of Santa Catarina (Portuguese: Assembleia Legislativa de Santa Catarina) is the unicameral legislature of Santa Catarina state in Brazil. It has 40 state deputies elected by proportional representation.

The Assembly was created on August 12, 1834, the first legislature had 20 deputies, until 1881 when it was increased to 22.
