= Napoleão Bernardes =

Brazilian politician (born 1982)

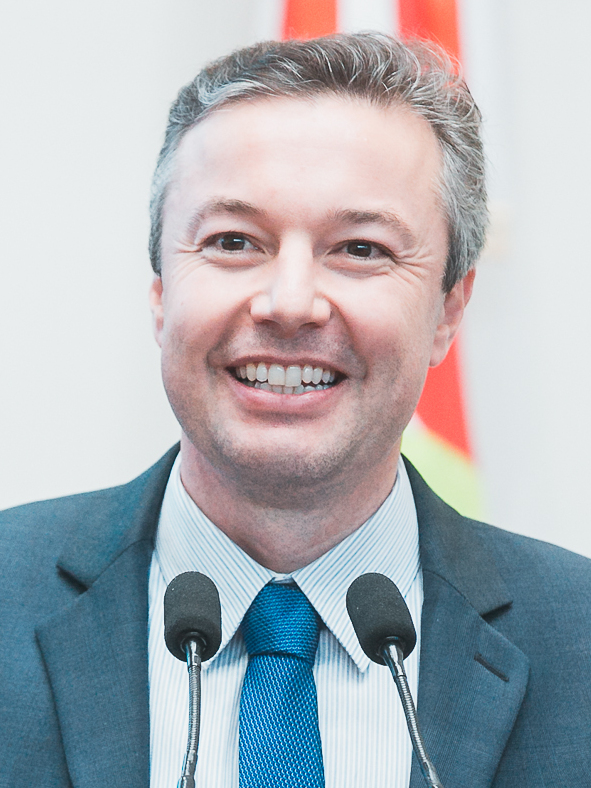
- Bernardes in 2023

Mayor of Blumenau
- In office 1 January 2013 – 25 April 2018
- Preceded by: João Paulo Kleinübing
- Succeeded by: Mário Hildebrandt

Personal details
- Born: 28 September 1982 (age 44)
- Party: Social Democratic Party (since 2019)

Napoleão Bernardes (born 28 September 1982) is a Brazilian politician serving as a member of the Legislative Assembly of Santa Catarina since 2023. From 2013 to 2018, he served as mayor of Blumenau.
