= João Paulo Kleinübing =

Brazilian politician

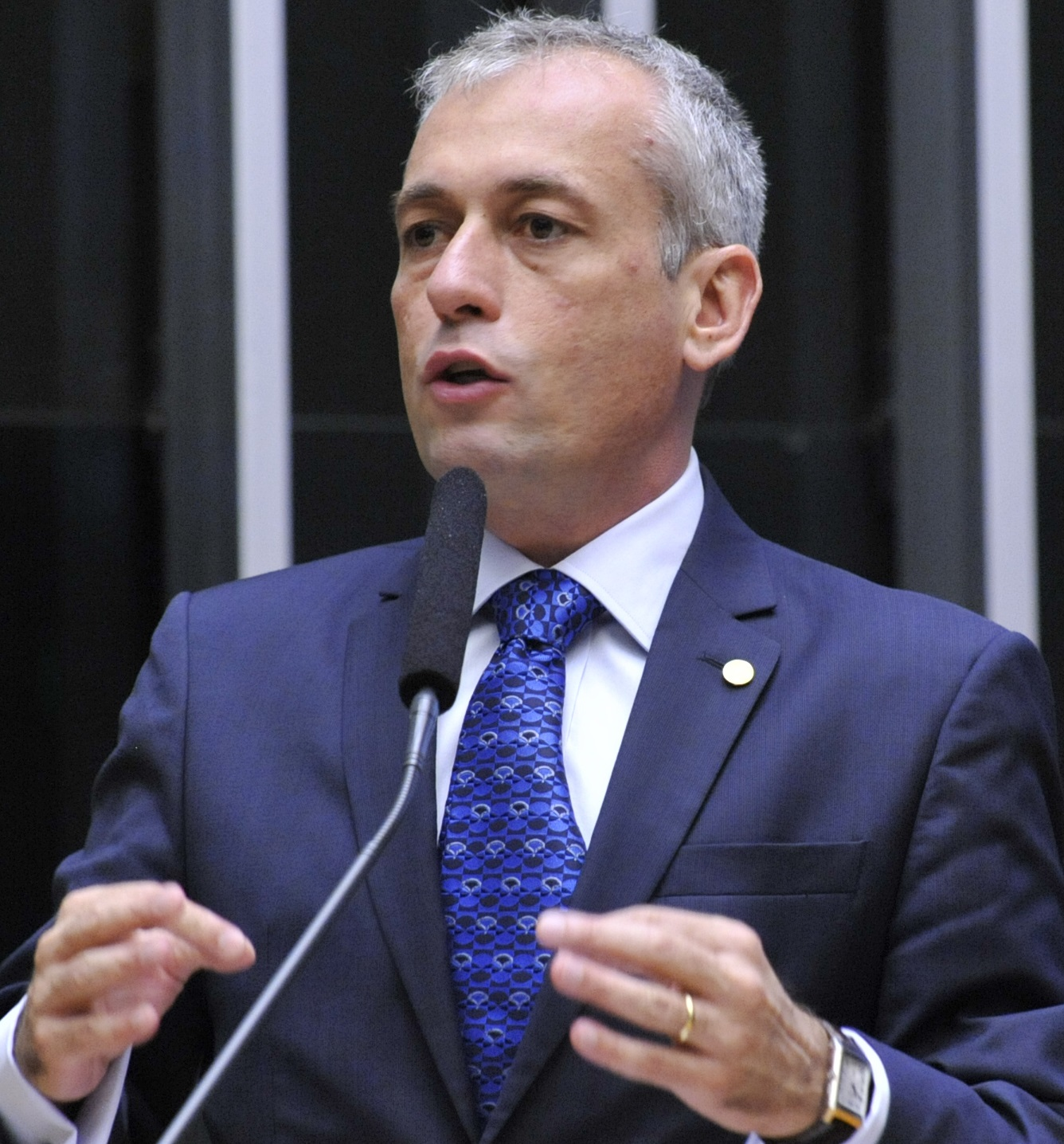
- Kleinübing in April 2016

Federal Deputy from Santa Catarina
- In office 1 February 2015 – 31 January 2019

Secretary of Health for Santa Catarina
- In office February 2015 – December 2016
- Governor: Raimundo Colombo

Mayor of Blumenau
- In office 1 January 2005 – 1 January 2013
- Preceded by: Décio Lima
- Succeeded by: Napoleão Bernardes

State Deputy for Santa Catarina
- In office 1 February 2003 – 31 December 2004

Personal details
- Born: 19 December 1972 (age 53) Florianópolis, Santa Catarina, Brazil
- Party: PL

João Paulo Karam Kleinübing (born 19 December 1972) is a Brazilian politician. He has spent his political career representing his home state of Santa Catarina, having served as federal deputy representative from 2015 to 2019, mayor of Blumenau from 2005 to 2013, and state deputy from 2003 to 2004.

== Personal life ==
Kleinübing was born to Vilson Pedro Kleinübing, later Governor of Santa Catarina, and Vera Maria Karam. He is married to Patrícia Loch Klenubing and is an alumnus of the Federal University of Santa Catarina. In addition to being a politician, Kleinübing previously was a business administrator and historian.

== Political career ==
Kleinübing was mayor of Blumenau in 2004 with 75,783 votes and reelected in 2008 with 112,509 votes. He was mayor during the historic 2008 Santa Catarina floods, being forced to declare a state of emergency in the municipality due to rising water levels.

He was elected to the federal chamber of deputies in the 2014 Brazilian general election. Kleinübing voted in favor of the impeachment of then-president Dilma Rousseff. He voted in favor of the 2017 Brazilian labor reform, and would vote in favor of opening of a corruption investigation into Rousseff's successor Michel Temer.
