= Vilson Pedro Kleinübing =

Brazilian politician

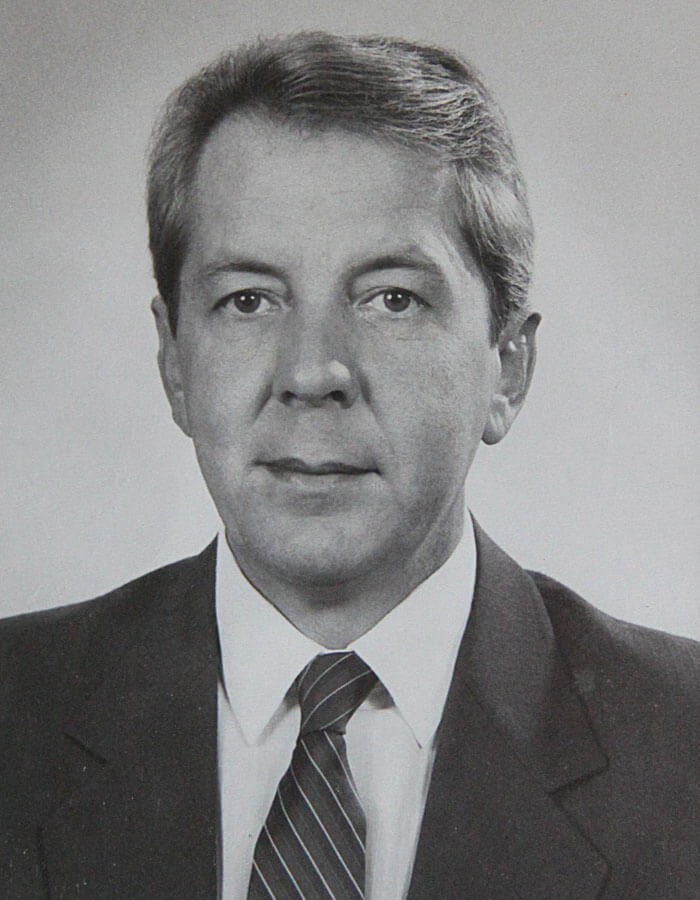
- Kleinübing as Mayor of Blumenau

Member of the Federal Senate
- In office 1 February 1995 – 23 October 1998

Governor of Santa Catarina
- In office 15 March 1991 – 6 April 1994
- Preceded by: Casildo Maldaner
- Succeeded by: Antônio Carlos Konder Reis

Mayor of Blumenau
- In office 1 January 1989 – 31 December 1990
- Preceded by: Dalto dos Reis
- Succeeded by: Victor Fernando Sasse

Member of the Chamber of Deputies
- In office 1983–1987

Personal details
- Born: 9 September 1944 Montenegro, Rio Grande do Sul, Brazil
- Died: 23 October 1998 (aged 54) Florianópolis, Brazil
- Spouse: Vera Maria Karam
- Children: 3 (including João Paulo Kleinübing)
- Occupation: Mechanical engineer, politician

Vilson Pedro Kleinübing (9 September 1944 - 23 October 1998) was a Brazilian politician who served as Governor of Santa Catarina from 1991 until 1994.

== Biography ==
=== Early life ===
Born in Montenegro, Rio Grande do Sul, his family later moved to Videira, where his father Waldemar Kleinübing would serve as mayor from 1966 until 1970. He held a mechanical engineering degree from the Federal University of Rio Grande do Sul (1968) and an economic engineering degree from the Federal University of Santa Catarina (1970).

In 1970 he became a member of Celesc and for six years was manager of the Distribution Department. He taught at the business and management school of Santa Catarina State University for eight years.

He served as a Federal Deputy from 1983 to 1987, Secretary of Agriculture and Supply of Santa Catarina, and Mayor of Blumenau from 1989 to 1990, the latter office of which he resigned from to run for Governor of Santa Catarina, which he won in 1991.

Kleinübing's administration saw a reduction of the cabinet from twenty-three to ten, the number of civil job positions being severed in half; and decreasing popularity stemming from the pay cuts that earned him the nickname of "mau patrão" (which is Portuguese for "bad boss") from his civil employees. He resigned from the office to take his seat in the Senate, where he would remain until his death.

In 1996, he participated in the CPI dos Títulos Públicos, where the state government he had previously commanded had been implicated in.

=== Death ===
Kleinübing died at the age of 54 on 23 October 1998 of lung cancer in Florianópolis. Geraldo Althoff, his first alternate who had been elected in 1990, completed his term in the Federal Senate. He was buried in the Cemitério Jardim da Paz de Florianópolis. Vice President Marco Maciel attended the funeral as the president's representative.

== Personal life ==
He was a close friend of Esperidião Amin, and he helped with Amin's unsuccessful 1978 Federal Deputy campaign.

His son is João Paulo Kleinübing.
