= Egidio Ferrari =

Brazilian politician (born 1981)

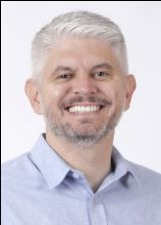
- Ferrari in 2024

Mayor of Blumenau
- Incumbent
- Assumed office 1 January 2025
- Preceded by: Mário Hildebrandt

Personal details
- Born: 18 September 1981 (age 45)
- Party: Liberal Party (since 2024)

Egidio Maciel Ferrari (born 18 September 1981) is a Brazilian politician serving as mayor of Blumenau since 2025. From 2023 to 2024, he was a member of the Legislative Assembly of Santa Catarina.
