= Mariana Weickert =

Brazilian model

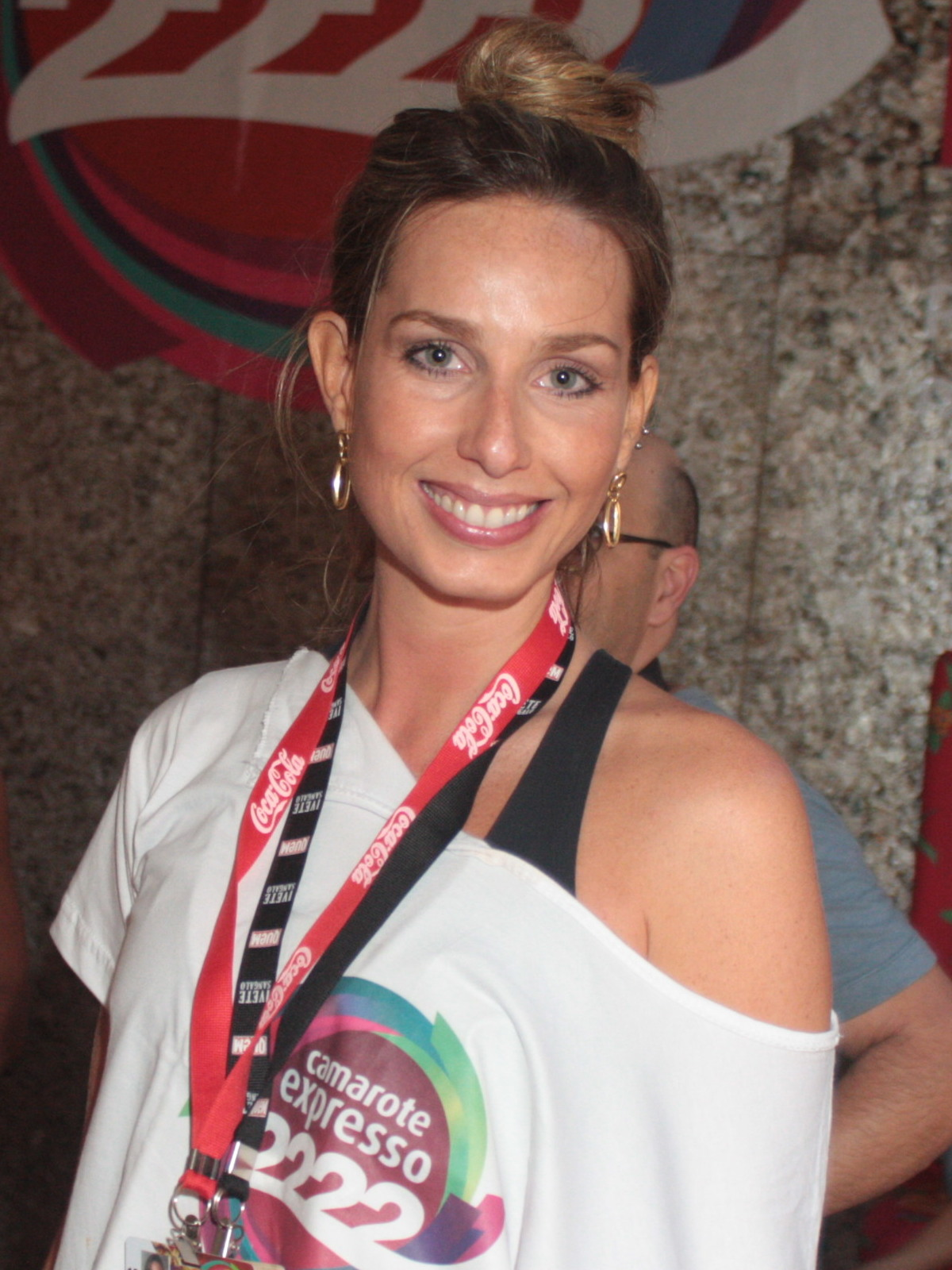
- Weickert in 2012
- Born: February 17, 1982 (age 44); Blumenau, Santa Catarina, Brazil
- Occupations: Model and TV host
- Years active: 2001–present
- Modeling information
- Height: 1.81 m (5 ft 11 in)
- Hair color: Light Brown
- Eye color: Green
- Agency: Ford Models

Mariana Müller Weickert (born February 17, 1982) is a Brazilian model represented by Ford Models. She was chosen by the German Vogue magazine for a 25-page editorial with major New York stylists. Lately she has been following a career as a TV host.

== TV shows ==
- 2005 - Pé na areia (MTV)
- 2005 - Saca-Rolha (Rede 21)
- 2008 - GNT Fashion (GNT)
- 2011 - Vamos Combinar (GNT)
- 2013 - present - A Liga (Band)
- 2014 - Desafio da Beleza (GNT)
- 2015 - S.O.S - Salvem o Salão (GNT)
- 2015 - Miss Brasil 2015 (Band)
