= 2008 Santa Catarina floods =

Coordinates: 27.833°S 48.416°W

2008 Santa Catarina floods and mudslides
- Affected area within the State of Santa Catarina.

Meteorological history
- Duration: late November 2008

Overall effects
- Fatalities: 128
- Damage: unknown
- Areas affected: Itajaí Valley, Santa Catarina

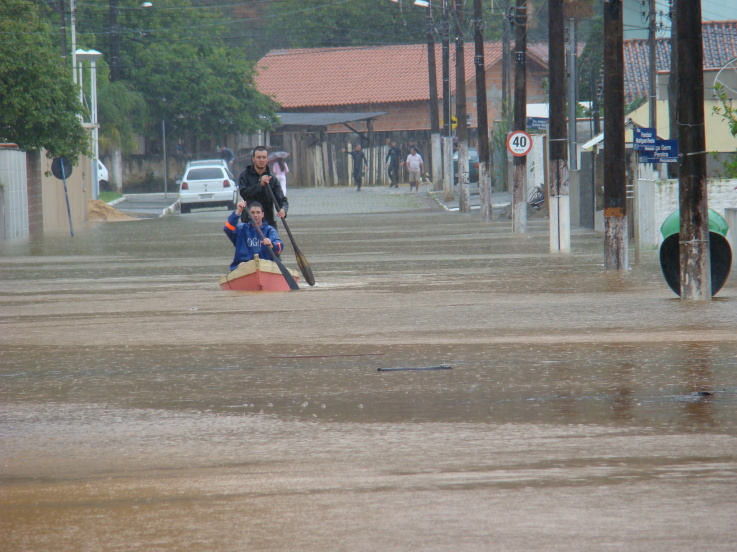
Flooding in the city of Itajaí, Santa Catarina

The 2008 Santa Catarina floods were floods in Santa Catarina, Brazil in November 2008. They occurred after a period of heavy rainfall, most significantly from 20-23 of November. The state had suffered constant rainfalls for over two months on the coast, which turned the soil wet enough to cause a landslide during the storm that hit the state in late November. It affected around 60 towns and over 1.5 million people in the state of Santa Catarina in Brazil. At least 128 people are confirmed to have been killed with over 78,700 being forced to evacuate their homes. A further 150,000 have been left without electricity, while water rationing is being carried out in at least one town due to purification problems. Santa Catarina state Governor Luiz Henrique da Silveira had earlier suggested that the final death toll was likely to be over 50, a figure that has proved optimistic. Several towns in the region have become cut off due to floodwater and landslide debris and on November 23 the Mayor of Blumenau, João Paulo Kleinübing, declared a state of emergency in the city. Water levels in the Vale do Itajaí have risen to eleven metres above normal.

== Reactions ==
- United States: United States government donated US$ 50,000 to help Santa Catarina buying food and water.
- Germany: German government donated €200,000 to buy food, water, hygiene material and mattress.
- Vatican City: Pope Benedict XVI send a message to the victims, where "want to assert spiritually in this hour of pain with the families of the victims and the thousands of evacuees and homeless this huge environmental tragedy."
- Brazil: The Brazilian Federal government issued a decree on November 27, 2008 releasing US$ 854 million in aid to the State of Santa Catarina.
- Brazil - Santa Catarina : The State Governor Luiz Henrique da Silveira has suggested that "Santa Catarina is facing its worst weather tragedy of its history" and told "Blumenau has to be rebuilt entirely". He also declared that the state is per 3 days in Mourning.

=== Blogosphere ===
Soon after the floods began, various bloggers from Blumenau began reporting about the situation on Twitter, providing photos, videos, forecast conditions and river levels for other people on the internet who were isolated by the floods. A site showed up on the Brazilian blogosphere to keep people informed and offering a channel for donations.
