= Itoupava Central =

Coordinates: 26°49′S 49°05′W

Itoupava Central is a neighborhood of Blumenau, Santa Catarina, Brazil located on north zone of the River Itajai-Açu. The principal streets are Alex Borchardt, better known as Sunset (in Portuguese: Pôr do sol), Pedro Zimmermann and Gustavo Zimmermann. A small part of this neighborhood is subject to flooding. WEG Transmissão e Distribuição, VEDAX, ABB Transformadores, Tecnoblu and Bebidas Max Willhelm are the main industrial plants on the area. The neighborhood is the home to three well known craft breweries: Bierland, Container and Alles Blau. Blumenau's regional airport (Quero-Quero) is located here. Ginástico Danceteria is the most important night club.
