= Vale do Itajaí =

Mesoregion in Santa Catarina, Brazil

Coordinates: 26°55′08″S 49°03′57″W

Vale do Itajaí Mesoregion

Vale do Itajaí (lit. 'Itajaí Valley') also known as Vale Europeu (lit. 'European Valley') is a mesoregion located in the Northeastern part of the Brazilian state of Santa Catarina. It has about 1.3 million inhabitants and comprises four smaller regions: Blumenau, Itajaí, Ituporanga and Rio do Sul. Most of the population is of German and Italian ancestry.

== Cities ==
Apiúna

Ascurra
Balneário Camboriú
Balneário Piçarras
Benedito Novo
Blumenau
Bombinhas
Brusque
Gaspar
Ibirama
Ilhota
Indaial
Itajaí
Itapema
Luiz Alves
Navegantes
Penha
Pomerode
Porto Belo
Rio do Sul

Rodeio
Timbó
Taió

=== Climate ===
Vale do Itajaí has a humid subtropical climate. The seasons of the year are distinct, with a well-defined summer and winter, and characteristic weather for fall and spring. Frost is infrequent, but occurs occasionally in winter. Because it is close the sea, relative humidity is 80% on average. There is significant precipitation which is well distributed throughout the year. The region is subject to floods. A major flood in 2008 caused over 100 deaths.

== Economy ==
Vale do Itajaí is fertile agricultural region. The main agricultural products in Vale do Itajaí are Tobacco, beef and dairy cattle and cereals. The tobacco produced on the Vale do Itajaí has a quality differential among other tobaccos in Brazil, what makes it one of the most desired tobaccos in the world. The most significant period for tourism is during Oktoberfest of Blumenau, a traditional Bavarian beer festival. In 2005, 365,288 tickets were sold and 266,811 litres (70,484 US gal) of beer were drunk at its pavilions. The record for public attendance was set in 1992, when over one million tickets were sold. The Port of Itajaí is the main port of Santa Catarina, and the second largest in Brazil in terms of the movement of containers. It serves as the main port for exports in the region, and almost all production of the state of Santa Catarina moves through it at some point.
