= Itoupava Norte =

- Neighborhood
- Country: Brazil
- Subdivision: South Region, Brazil
- City: Blumenau

Area
  - Total: 6.3 km^{2} (2.4 sq mi)

Population (2015)
  - Total: 19,327
  - Density: 3,100/km^{2} (7,900/sq mi)
- Time zone: UTC-3:00

Itoupava Norte is a neighborhood of Blumenau, Santa Catarina, Brazil located on the left bank of the River Itajai-Açu. As of 2015, it has a population of 19,327, and an area of 6.3 km2.
