= Emílio Henrique Baumgart =

Brazilian engineer (1889–1943)

Emílio Henrique Baumgart or Emil Heinrich Baumgart (in German) was a Brazilian engineer.

== Background ==
Baumgart was born on May 25, 1889, in the city of Blumenau, in the state of Santa Catarina, Brazil. His father was the German immigrant Gustav Baumgart and his mother was Mathilde Odebrecht, daughter of the German immigrant and engineer Emil Odebrecht. A typical German-Brazilian of his days, Emílio Henrique Baumgart was bilingual, speaking both German and Portuguese fluently.

== Education ==
Emílio Henrique Baumgart started his studies in his home state but also studied in the city of São Leopoldo in the state of Rio Grande do Sul. Later, he attended the Escola Politécnica do Rio de Janeiro (today's Escola de Engenharia da UFRJ).

== Career ==
While attending the Escola Politécnica, Baumgart worked as an intern with the Firma L. Riedlinger (an engineering firm located in Rio de Janeiro). Lambert Riedlinger brought the reinforced concrete building technique from Germany at the time. As a result, Baumgart became well known for his innovative projects throughout Brazil and abroad.

== Personal ==
Baumgart married Stela Maria in 1915 with whom he had a son and a daughter (his son died aged 24). He died unexpectedly on his way to work on 9 October 1943.
