= Bruna Pickler =

Brazilian actress, composer, athlete and journalist

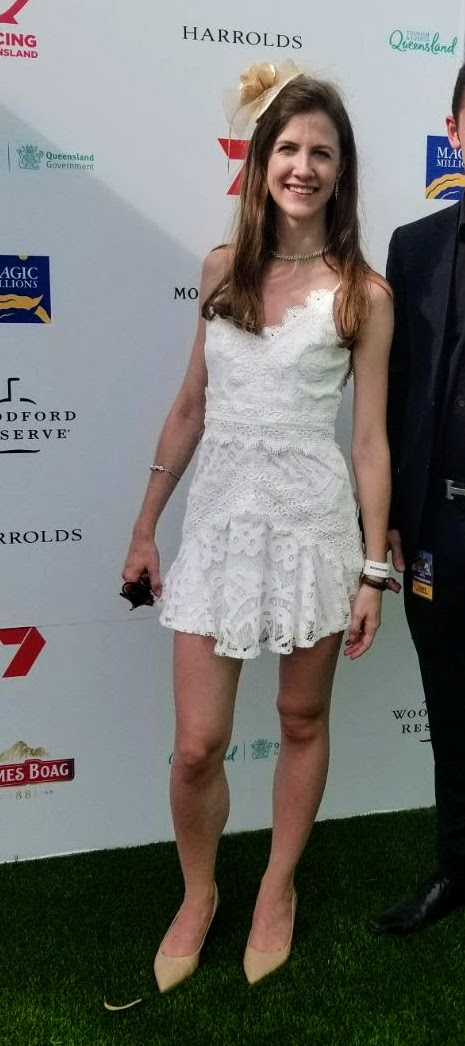
- B. Pickler at horse racing event in 2018

Personal information
- Native name: 皮克勒
- Nationality: Brazil
- Born: June 17, 1990 (age 36)
- Education: University of Macau
- Occupation(s): Stage Actress, Model, Athlete, Sports Reporter
- Agent: Daphne Model Agency (Brazil); East West - The Global Modelling Agency (Asia and Global)
- Height: 163 cm (5 ft 4 in)
- Weight: 48 kg (106 lb; 7 st 8 lb)

Sport
- Country: Chinese Macau and Brazil
- Sport: Archery and Show Jumping
- Rank: 17
- University team: UMSUAA
- Team: UMSUAA (2018-19), Wolff Archery (2020)
- Turned pro: 19/02/2019

Achievements and titles
- Regional finals: Hong Kong Archery Open (2018) 9th runner up
- Highest world ranking: 97

Bruna Boege Pickler (born 17 June 1990 in Blumenau) is a Brazilian athlete, actress, composer, and sports reporter. She holds a Master of Arts degree in Communication and New Media from the University of Macau.

Bruna Pickler competes in recurve archery and in 2021 ended up ranked 17th archer on national Brazil level for Olympic outdoor category.

Pickler developed from a young age an interest for show jumping and competed in the sport at minor regional events. Later, it was by means of archery that she was able to compete on professional international level since 2018. Bruna Pickler has represented Chinese team consecutively in 2018 and 2019, competing in Hong Kong at Inter-port Indoor Archery Open on both years.

She is fluent in Portuguese, English, and Mandarin.

== Alma Mater ==
Bruna Pickler graduated in 2018 with a Master of Arts degree by University of Macau. Her area of research is Video Games. Her Master's Thesis is entitled Narrative, Gender and Ideology in Video Games

== Career ==
=== Artistry and media influences ===
Her acting career is based on theatre and the highlight encompasses the original Macanese play entitled The Three Ladies of Macao. Bruna Pickler played Lady Conscience under the original 2016 international casting, one of the three leading roles of the play.

== Athletic career ==
Pickler's first entry in an archery competition was in 2018 where she played for University of Macau, China, securing 9th place in Recurve Women Individual category in 2018 multinational Inter-port Archery Open (Hong Kong).

In 2019 Pickler played for the same team, finishing this time 17th in Recurve Women Individual category.

In 2020 Pickler was officially added to the national Brazilian professional archery athletes, whereas she played for St. Catarina state's Team Wolff Archery.

As the competition events resume after the long break in 2020, Pickler had hit the mark of 11th best female player on Brazil national level at indoor competition Archery Cup of The Americas, scoring 458 points. At the same event, Pickler ranked 97th best on international level.

Pickler competed in the 46th Brazilian National Adult Outdoor Championship against top Brazilian archers and secured the top 20 in the overall recurve feminine national Brazilian ranking, as she hits her personal best score in the category with 400 points.

In 2021, Pickler competed in the 47th Brazilian National Adult Outdoor Championship against top Brazilian archers and this time secured the 17th spot, after losing the round of 16 for Ane Marcelle.
