= Blumenau =

- Municipality
- Municipality of Blumenau
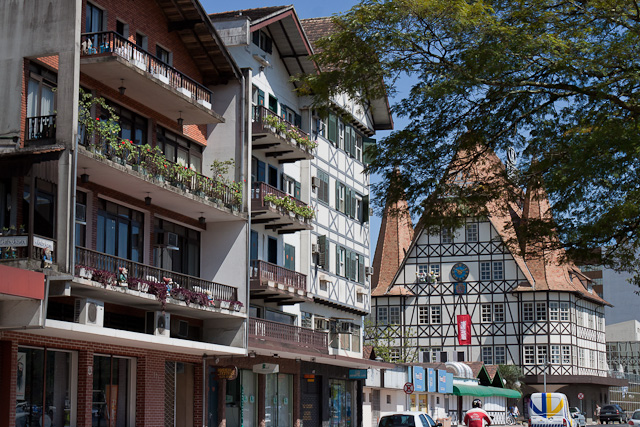
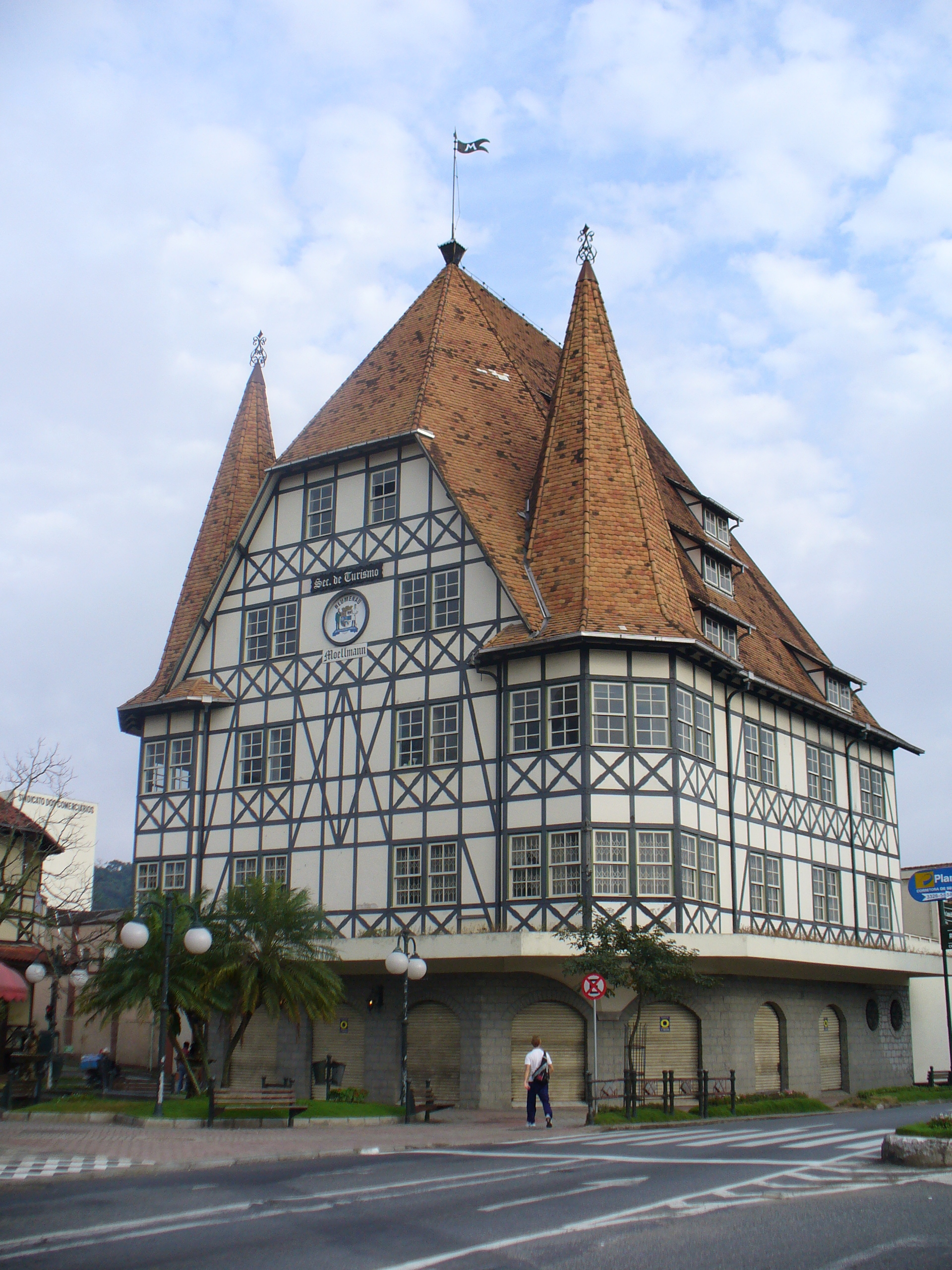
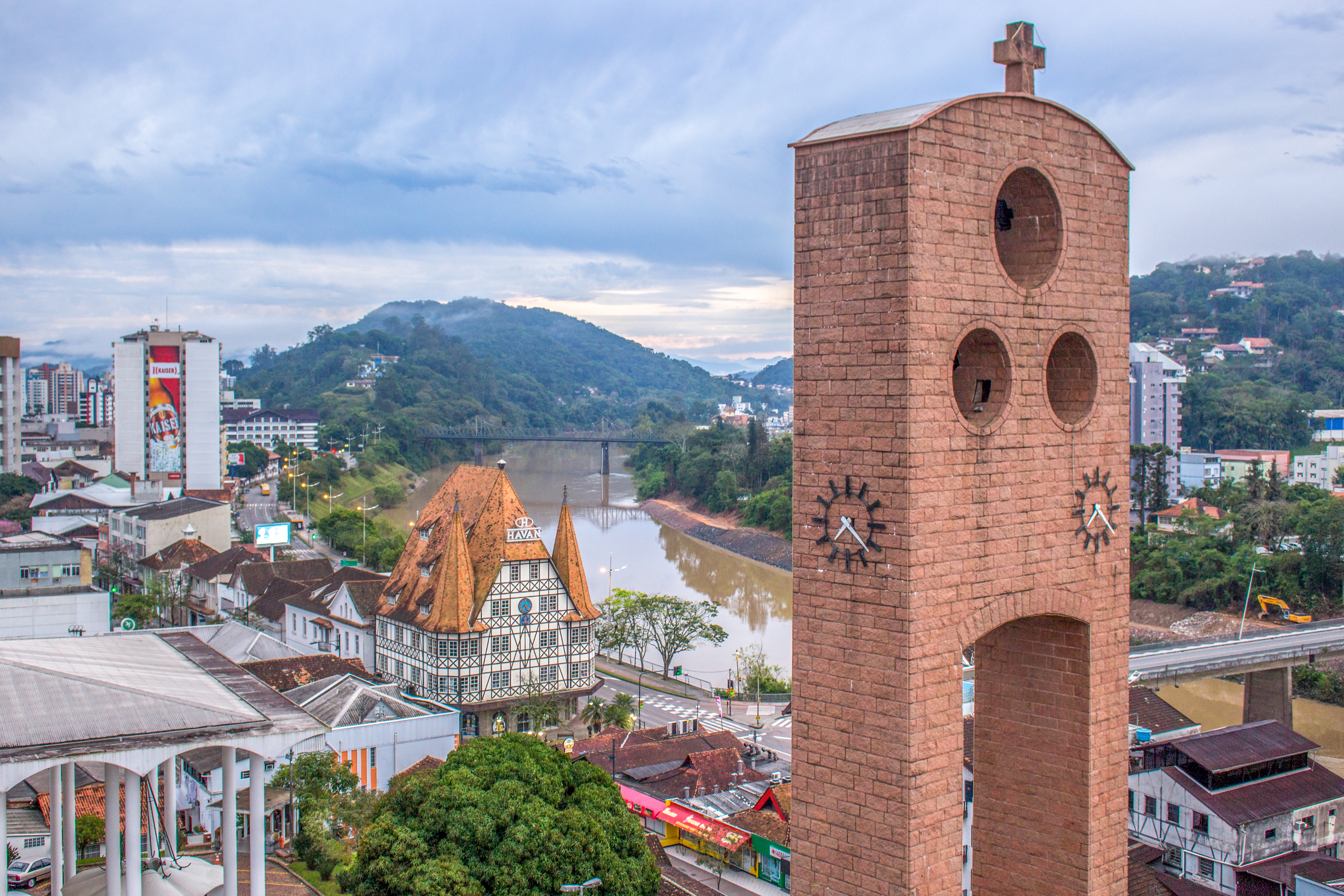
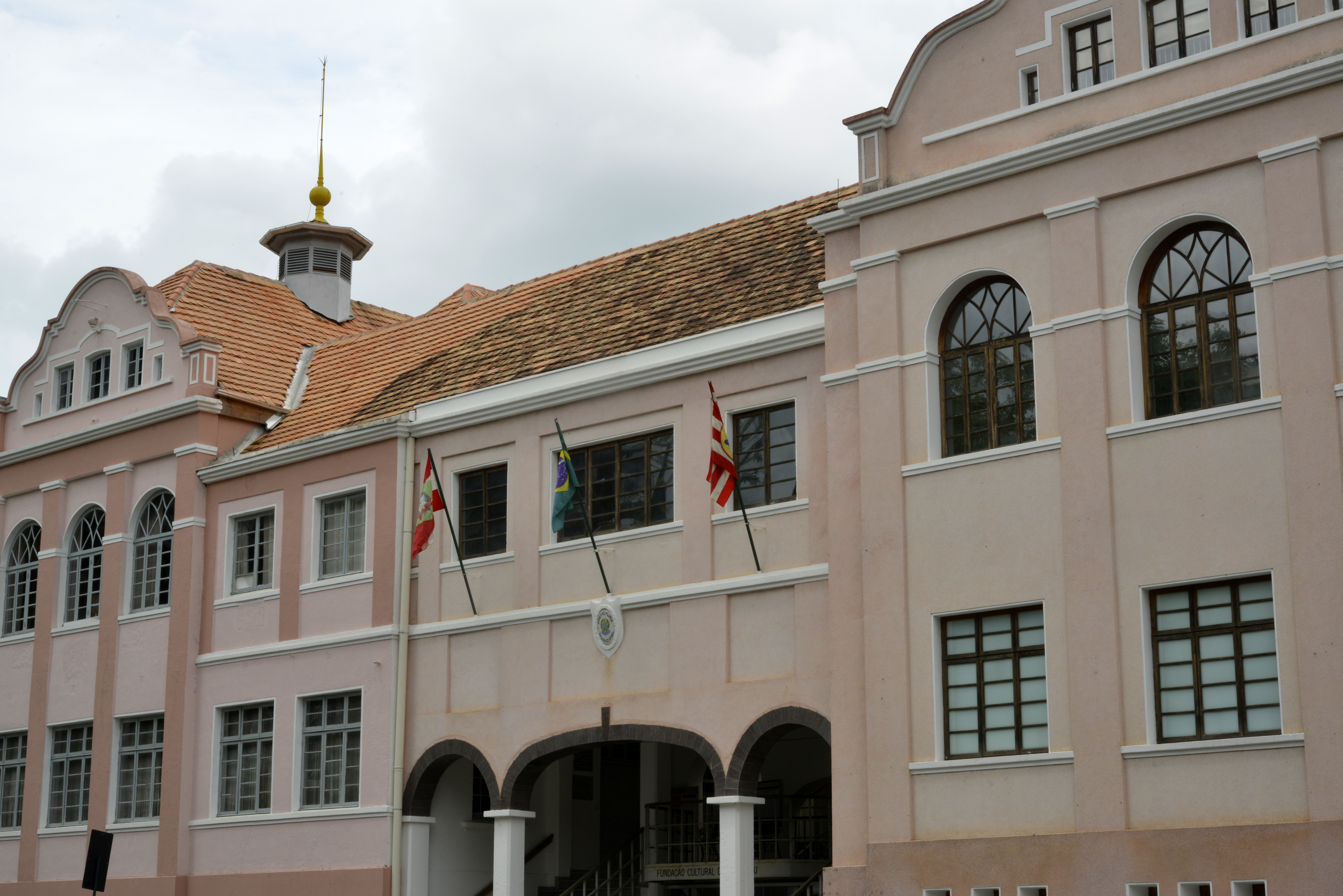
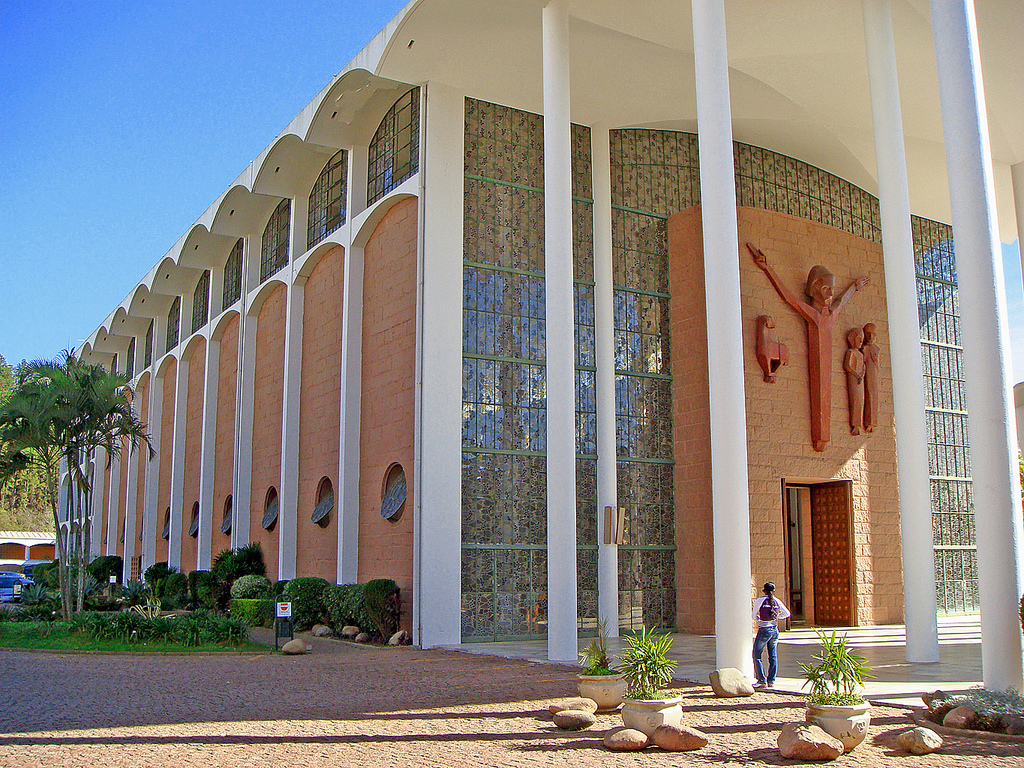
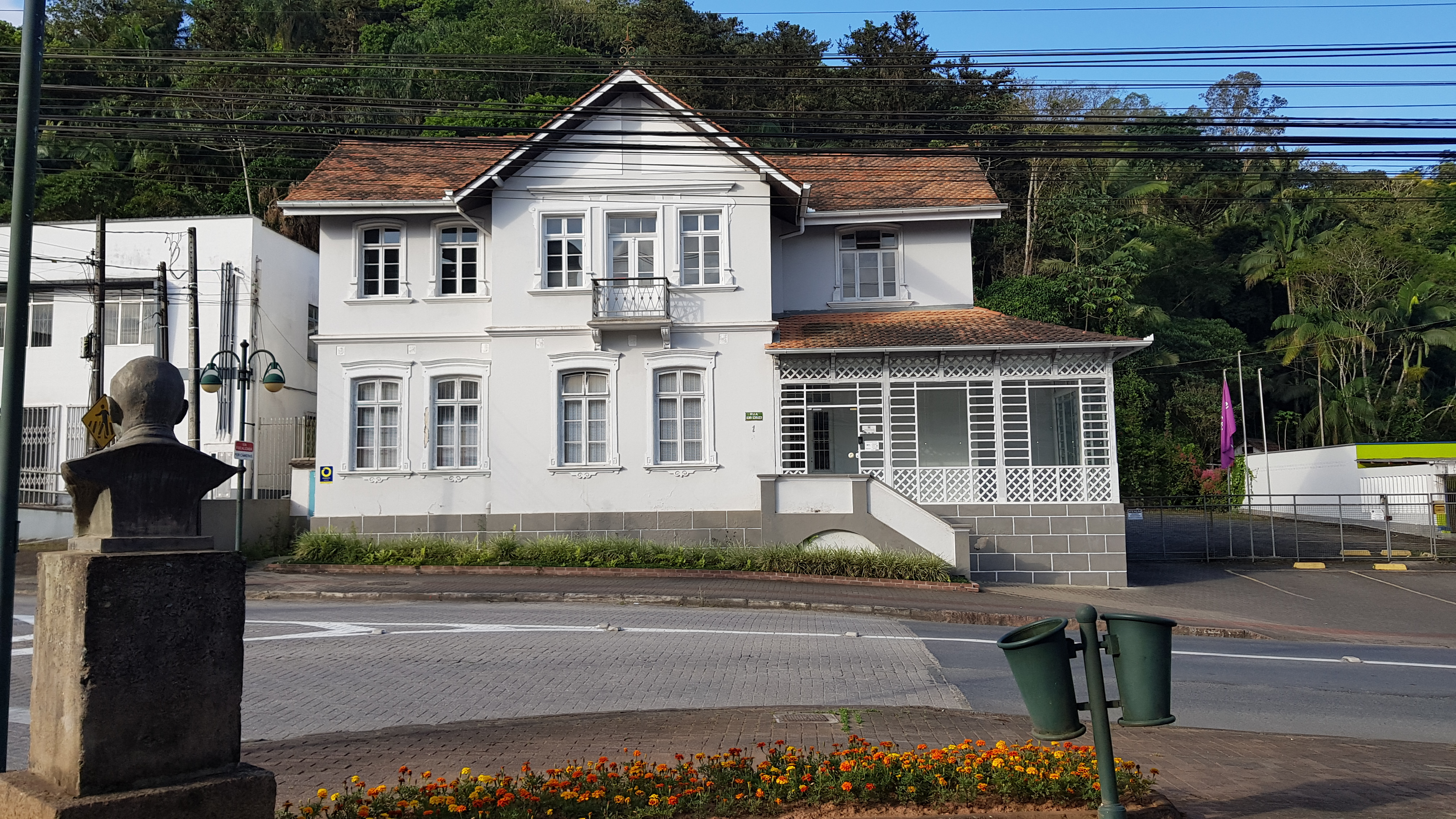
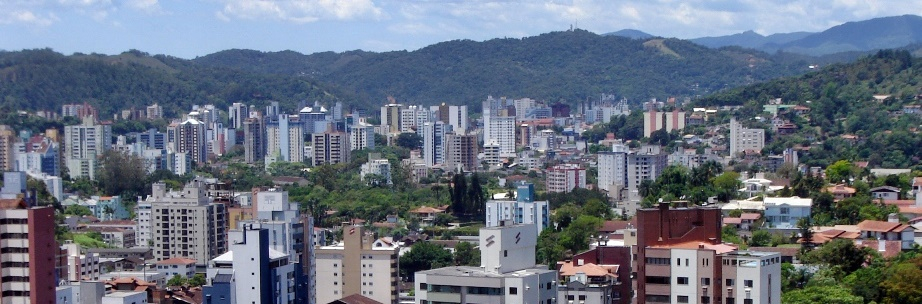

- Flag Coat of arms
- Nicknames: Cidade Jardim ("Garden City") and Alemanha Tropical ("Tropical Germany")
- Motto: Pro Sancta Catharina et Brasilia (Latin)
- Location in Santa Catarina

- Location in Brazil
- Coordinates: 26°55′08″S 49°03′57″W
- Country: Brazil
- Region: South
- State: Santa Catarina
- Founded: September 2, 1850
- Named for: Hermann Blumenau

Government
  - Mayor: Egidio Ferrari (2025–2028) (PL)

Area
  - Total: 519.837 km^{2} (200.710 sq mi)
- Elevation: 21 m (69 ft)

Population (2022)
  - Total: 361,261
  - Estimate (2025): 385,558
  - Density: 694.951/km^{2} (1,799.91/sq mi)
- Time zone: GMT-3
- Postal code: 89000-000
- Area code: +55 47
- HDI (2010): 0.806 – very high
- Website: blumenau.sc.gov.br

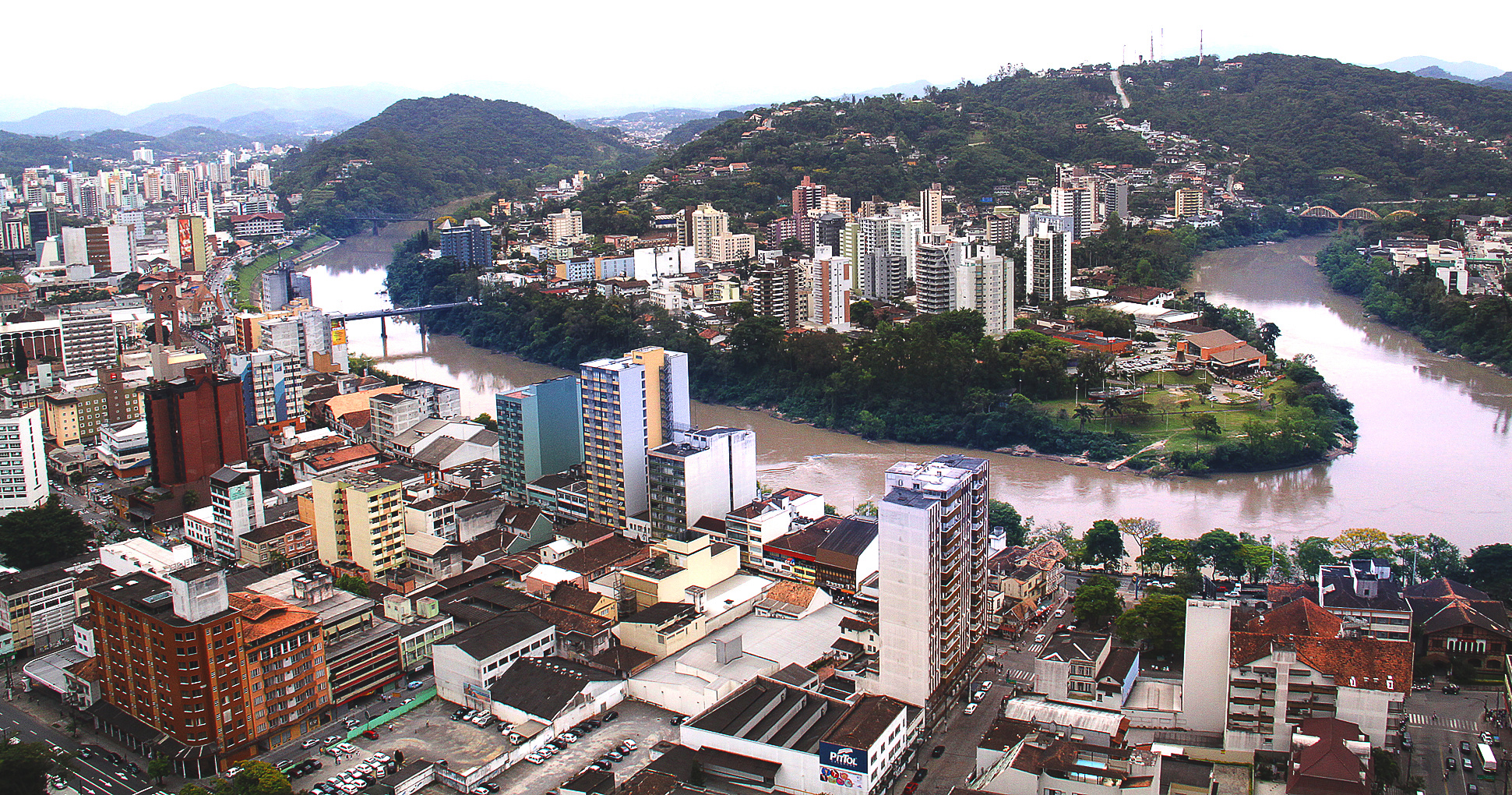
Aerial photo of the city centre

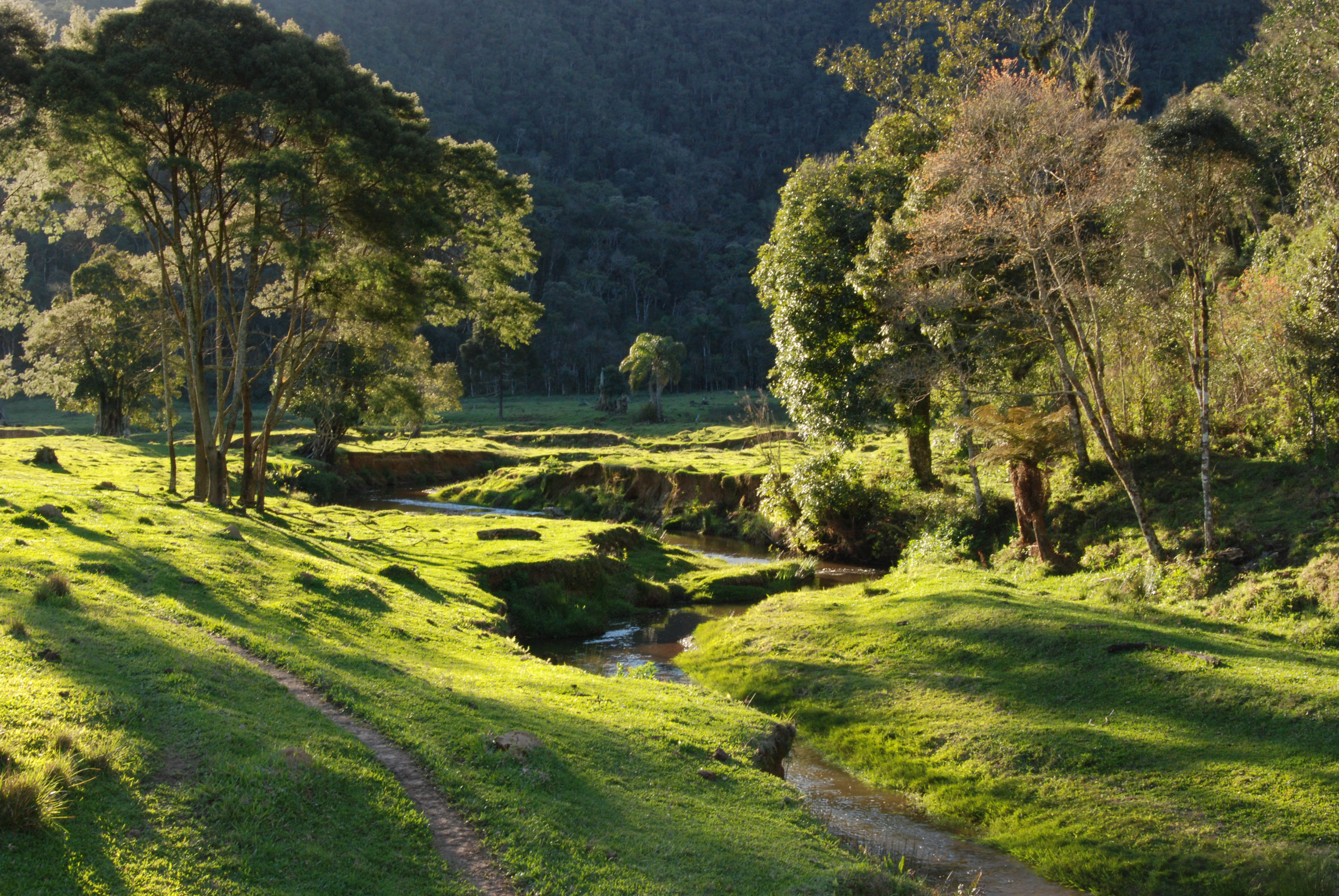
Serra do Itajaí National Park

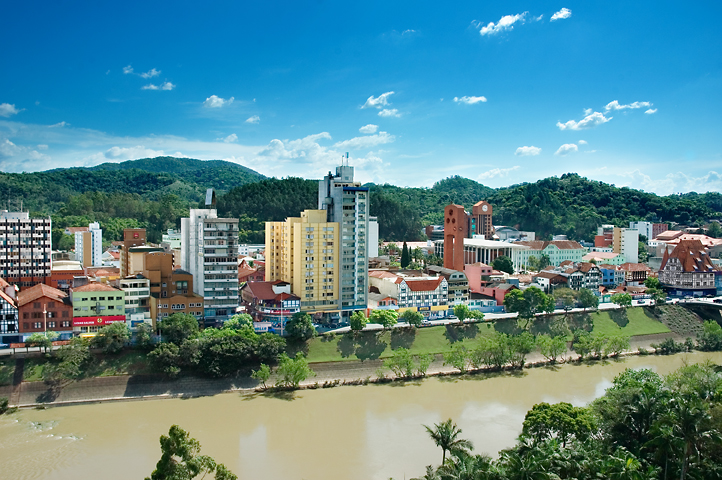
Downtown Blumenau

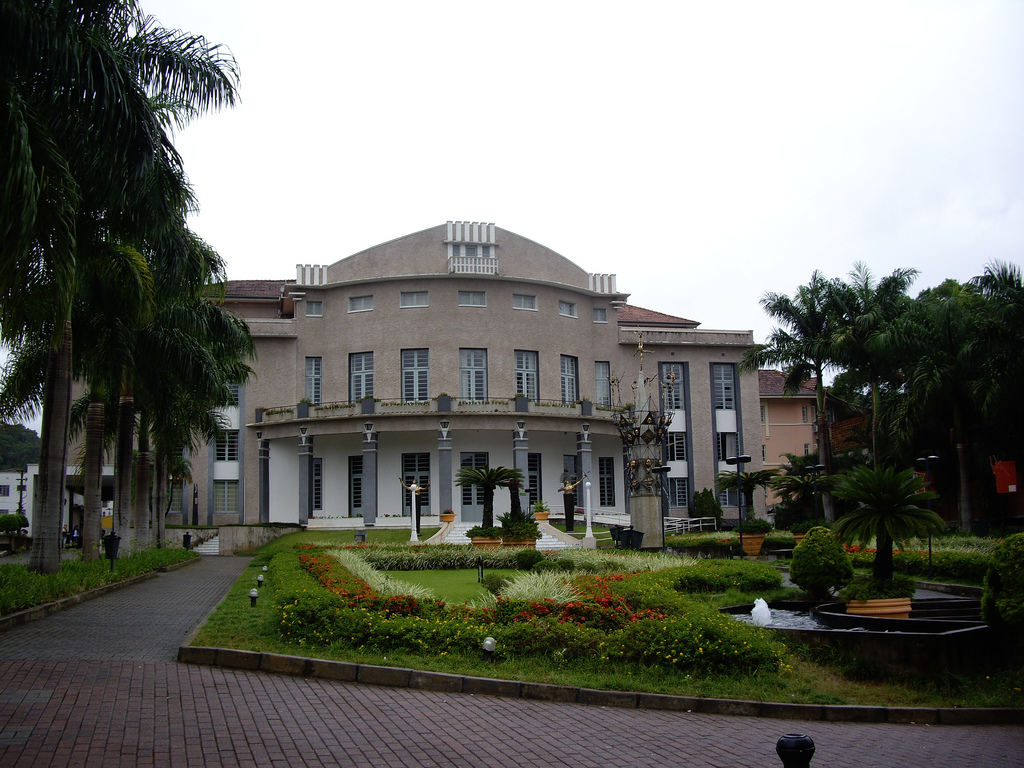
Carlos Gomes Theater

Blumenau (Brazilian Portuguese: [blumeˈnaw]) is a city in Vale do Itajaí, Santa Catarina state, in the South Region of Brazil, 130 km (81 mi) from the state capital Florianópolis.

The city was founded by the German chemist and pharmacist Hermann Blumenau (1819–1899), who arrived on a boat via the Itajaí-Açu River accompanied by seventeen other Germans, and still celebrates its German heritage, including the second largest Oktoberfest in the Americas.

== History ==
The city was founded September 2, 1850, by Hermann Blumenau and seventeen other German immigrants. Later arrivals included Fritz Müller, biologist and early proponent of Darwinian Evolution.

The history of Blumenau is the result of the arrival of German immigrants who settled these fertile areas of the Atlantic Forest. In 1845, having an interest in the problems faced by European immigrants, Hermann Blumenau reached an agreement with the Society for the Protection of German Emigrants to represent it and traveled to Brazil, aiming to create new German settlements and to check the situation of those that already existed. He traveled to Rio Grande do Sul, and then to Santa Catarina, where he visited the German colony of São Pedro de Alcântara. Aware of comments about the Itajaí Valley, he explored it in detail, in association with his compatriot Ferdinand Hackradt, since the aforementioned society was dissolved.

After taking certain precautions, Hermann Blumenau headed for Costa do Marfim (Ivory Coast), to seek immigrants. On September 2, 1850, Hermann Blumenau returned to the chosen area with the 17 initial immigrants. Despite the floods, clashes with wild animals and even with the indigenous peoples, due to the work of German immigrants willing to migrate continuously in greater numbers, the settlement prospered. Those first immigrants had a great support from the Brazilian government, who gave them land, housing, livestock, seeds, education and healthcare for very low prices, and in many cases, entirely free.

On February 4, 1880, the municipality of Blumenau was created, composed of about 13,000 residents.

== Demographics ==
Historical population
Year	Pop.	±%
1970	100,275	—
1980	157,251	+56.8%
1991	212,025	+34.8%
2000	261,808	+23.5%
2010	309,011	+18.0%
2022	361,261	+16.9%

As of 2020, Blumenau had an estimated population of 361,855 people, with an area of 519 km^{2} (200 sq mi). The main ethnic origin of the city inhabitants are German and Italian. The city displays many historical and cultural reminders of their heritage, such as houses and other buildings built in traditional German styles, statues, and memorials.

Blumenau, compared to other Brazilian cities, has a very high Human Development Index, 0.806 as of 2010.

=== Ethnic composition ===
Source: 2022 census

Race/Skin color	Percentage	Number
White	79.0%	285,354
Pardo (Mixed-race)	17.1%	61,684
Black	3.7%	13,272
Asian	0.2%	580
Indigenous	0.1%	367

=== Religion ===
Source: 2010 IBGE Census

Religion	Percentage	Number
Catholics	73.90%	193,474
Protestants	22.13%	57,935
No religion	1.22%	3,200
Kardecists	0.72%	1,894

== Geography ==
The city is located in a valley bisected by the Itajaí-Açu River, surrounded by hills with forests. The lower areas, including towers and tall buildings in the city center, constantly suffer from the threat of floods. Blumenau's first recorded flood took place in the dawn on September 23, 1880. The worst took place in 1983 and 1984, when the city was completely isolated for weeks. Today, Blumenau is well-prepared against such threats, but many citizens prefer to live in higher areas spread into the nearby hills and plains to avoid flooding. However, this planning could not avoid even worse flooding in late November 2008, that killed over 100 and forced thousands to evacuate.

=== Climate ===
The climate of Blumenau is considered to be subtropical, a climate of transition between the predominantly tropical climate of Brazil and the predominantly temperate climate of Argentina. Under the Köppen climate classification, the city has a warm, humid subtropical climate.

Blumenau, like the entire state of Santa Catarina, is located south of the Tropic of Capricorn; therefore it is mild in the winter with temperatures averaging 16.6 °C (61 °F) and hot and humid in the summer with high temperatures averaging around 30 °C (87 °F). On July 23, 2013 the downtown of the city got a snow-rain mix and higher neighborhoods had accumulating snow.

Climate data for Blumenau (1976–2005)
Month	Jan	Feb	Mar	Apr	May	Jun	Jul	Aug	Sep	Oct	Nov	Dec	Year
Record high °C (°F)	43.0 (109.4)	42.0 (107.6)	40.8 (105.4)	36.4 (97.5)	33.8 (92.8)	33.2 (91.8)	33.0 (91.4)	35.6 (96.1)	37.7 (99.9)	37.5 (99.5)	40.0 (104.0)	41.0 (105.8)	43.0 (109.4)
Mean daily maximum °C (°F)	31.9 (89.4)	31.6 (88.9)	30.5 (86.9)	27.9 (82.2)	24.9 (76.8)	22.5 (72.5)	22.3 (72.1)	23.3 (73.9)	24.0 (75.2)	26.1 (79.0)	28.5 (83.3)	30.7 (87.3)	27.0 (80.6)
Daily mean °C (°F)	24.5 (76.1)	24.4 (75.9)	23.2 (73.8)	21.0 (69.8)	18.1 (64.6)	16.2 (61.2)	15.5 (59.9)	16.4 (61.5)	17.9 (64.2)	19.6 (67.3)	21.5 (70.7)	23.4 (74.1)	20.1 (68.3)
Mean daily minimum °C (°F)	20.2 (68.4)	20.3 (68.5)	19.5 (67.1)	17.1 (62.8)	14.1 (57.4)	12.4 (54.3)	11.6 (52.9)	12.4 (54.3)	14.2 (57.6)	15.9 (60.6)	17.3 (63.1)	18.9 (66.0)	16.2 (61.1)
Record low °C (°F)	10.5 (50.9)	10.0 (50.0)	9.8 (49.6)	6.2 (43.2)	1.0 (33.8)	−3.0 (26.6)	−2.8 (27.0)	−0.6 (30.9)	3.0 (37.4)	3.9 (39.0)	5.0 (41.0)	8.6 (47.5)	−3.0 (26.6)
Average precipitation mm (inches)	250 (9.8)	222 (8.7)	162 (6.4)	101 (4.0)	115 (4.5)	111 (4.4)	99 (3.9)	100 (3.9)	167 (6.6)	163 (6.4)	157 (6.2)	176 (6.9)	1,823 (71.7)
Average relative humidity (%)	82	84	84	85	86	87	86	85	85	84	81	81	84
Mean monthly sunshine hours	165	153	165	148	144	123	136	133	93	117	141	161	1,679
Source: Empresa Brasileira de Pesquisa Agropecuária (EMBRAPA)

== Economy ==
Blumenau's main economic activity is still the textile industry, represented by large manufacturers such as Cia. Hering, Karsten and Teka.

Another area that draws attention is that of information technology; the city is the headquarters of the so-called Brazilian Silicon Valley, and many software leaders in its segment, some of whom were born in Blusoft and Instituto Gene startup incubators. Blumenau is also known as a location for the manufacturing of metallurgic, mechanical, and electrical equipment.

It has a strong economy, boosted by strong trade, service, and tourism events, with exhibitions of international importance, which are generally held in Vila Germânica (German Villa Park). Additionally, a new but rapidly expanding market is the production of craft beer, such as Eisenbahn.

=== Transport ===
Even though Blumenau is served by Quero-quero Airport, normally passengers use scheduled flights operated from Ministro Victor Konder International Airport, located in the nearby municipality of Navegantes. Gol Airlines, Azul Brazilian Airlines, and Latam offer for its passengers bus transfers between Navegantes and Blumenau at regular times. During Oktoberfest, Azul operates flights at the local airport.

=== Tourism ===
The Blumenau's Tourism Department maintains four tour routes covering different aspects of the city. Besides these, there's the festival of the municipality. Also, the Oktoberfest of Blumenau, held every October, attracts over a million tourists every year. Originally begun as a fundraiser to alleviate the devastating floods of 1983 and 1984, the Blumenau Oktoberfest has become the second largest Oktoberfest after Munich.

== Subdivisions ==
Blumenau has 35 neighbourhoods:

- Água Verde
- Badenfurt
- Boa Vista
- Bom Retiro
- Centro
- Escola Agrícola
- Fidélis
- Fortaleza
- Fortaleza Alta
- Garcia
- Glória
- Itoupava Central
- Itoupava Norte
- Itoupava Seca
- Itoupavazinha
- Jardim Blumenau
- Nova Esperança
- Passo Manso
- Ponta Aguda
- Progresso
- Ribeirão Fresco
- Salto
- Salto do Norte
- Salto Weissbach
- Testo Salto
- Tribess
- Valparaíso
- Velha
- Velha Central
- Velha Grande
- Victor Konder
- Vila Formosa
- Vila Itoupava
- Vila Nova
- Vorstadt

== Notable people ==
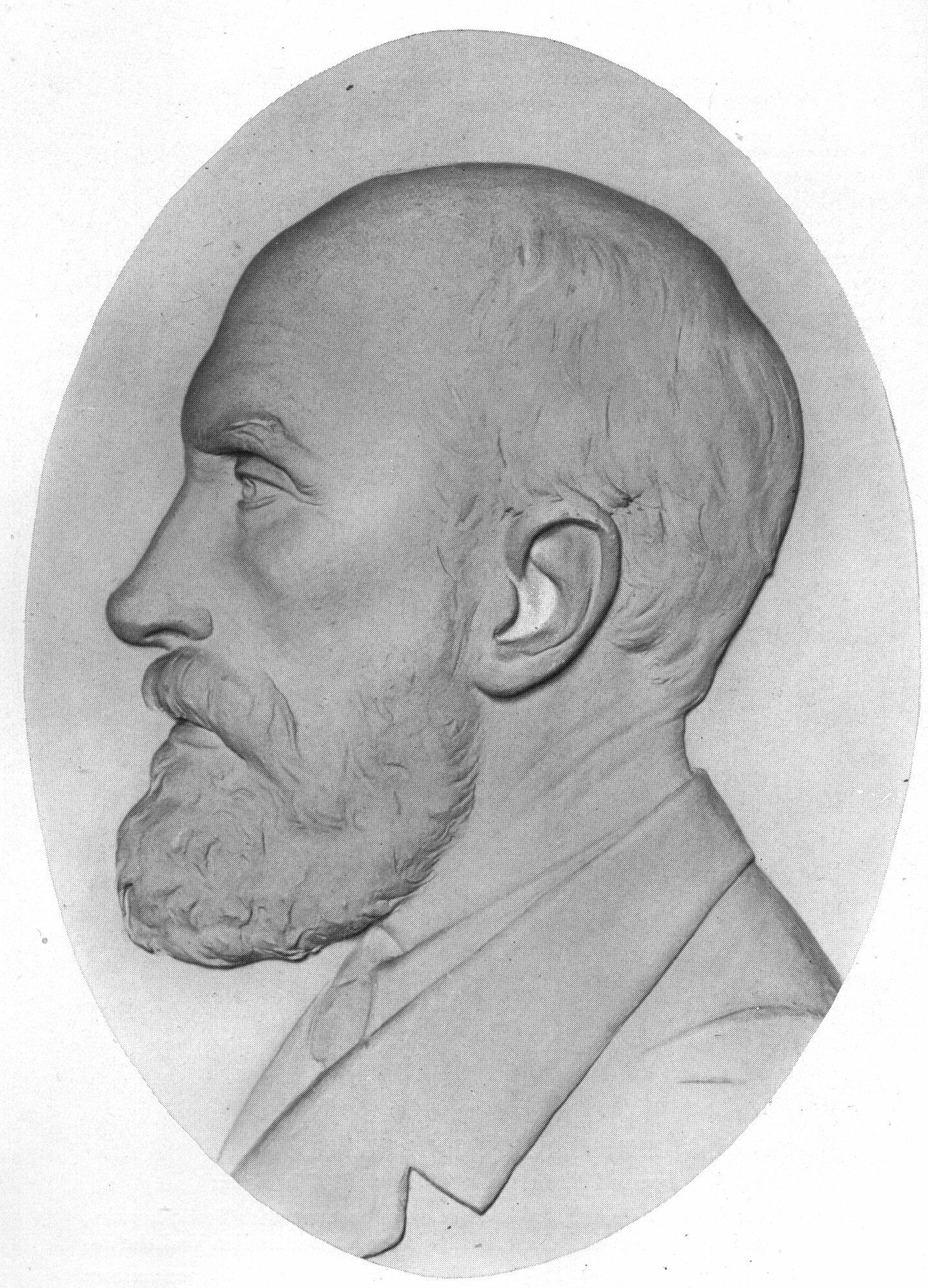
Hermann Blumenau

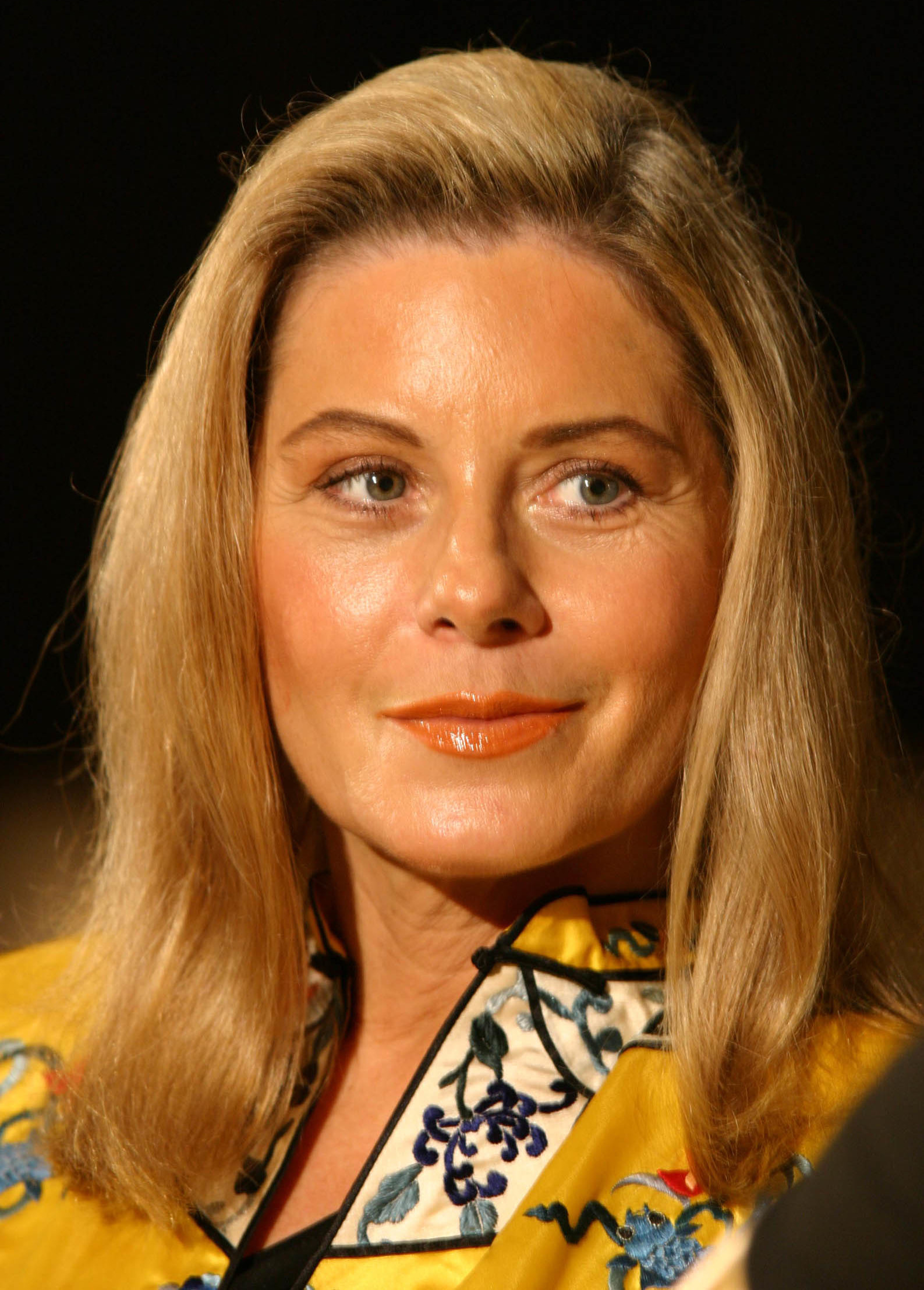
Vera Fischer

- Hermann Blumenau (1819–1899) German pharmacist who founded the city of Blumenau
- Emílio Henrique Baumgart (1889 in Blumenau - 1943) architect and engineer
- Fritz Müller (1821 – 1897 in Blumenau) biologist, an early advocate of Darwinism
- Vera Fischer (born 1951 in Blumenau) actress
- Rita Schadrack (1931 in Blumenau – 1988) film, stage, and voice actress
- Martin Drewes (1918 – 2013 in Blumenau) Luftwaffe military aviator, night fighter ace in WWII
- Mariana Weickert (born 1972 in Blumenau) model
- João Geraldo Kuhlmann (1882 in Blumenau - 1958) a botanist, specialist on the taxonomy of Angiosperms
- Luiz Henrique da Silveira (1940 in Blumenau – 2015) politician and lawyer
- Edward af Sillén (born 1982 in Blumenau) Swedish screenwriter & director for film and TV
- Armin Zimmermann (1917 in Blumenau – 1976) German admiral and Inspector General of the Bundeswehr

=== Sport ===
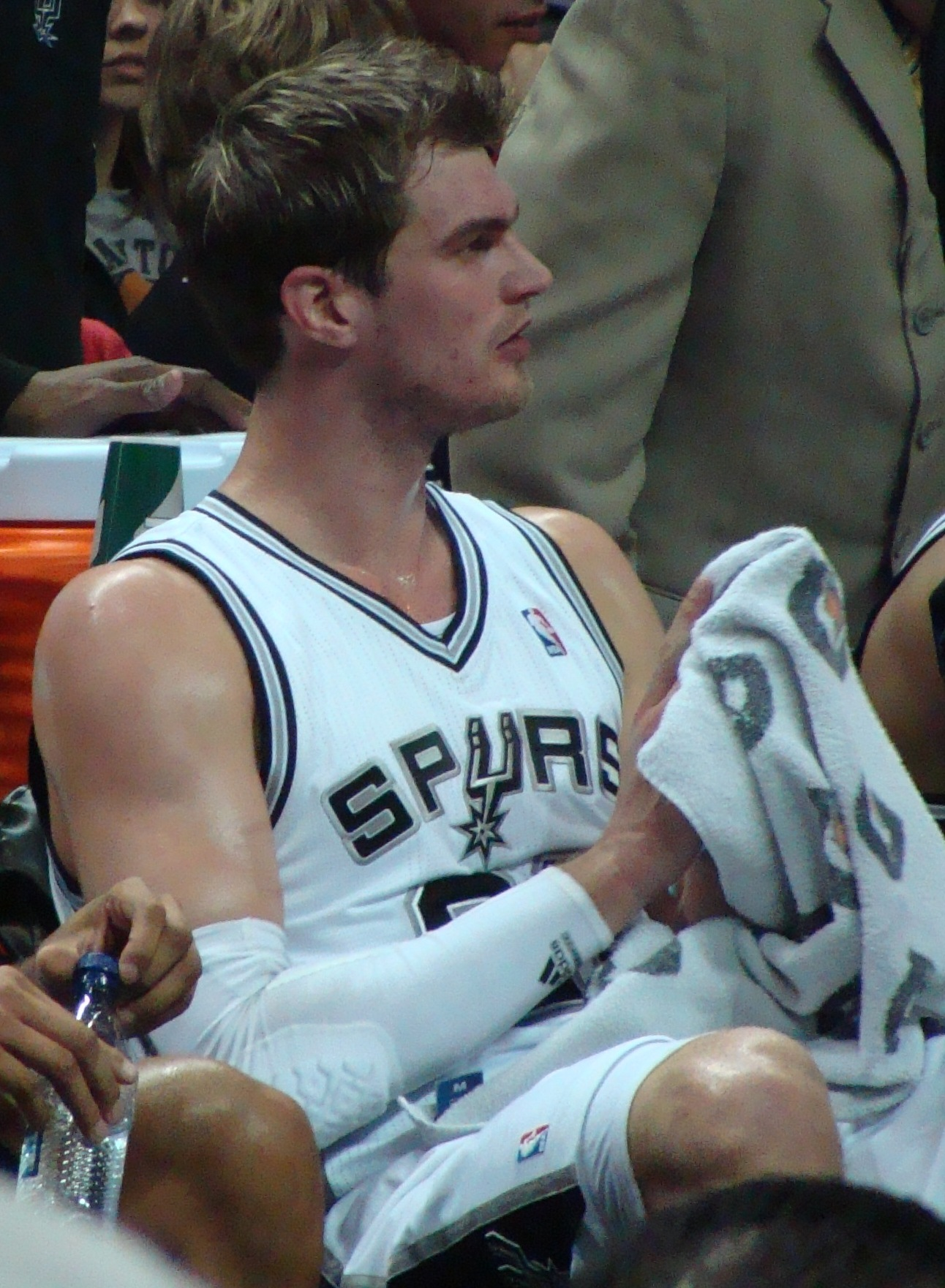
Tiago Splitter, 2012

- Tiago Splitter, (born 1985 in Blumenau) basketball coach and former player
- Tiago Volpi, (born 1990 in Blumenau) football goalkeeper
- Bruna Pickler, (born 1990 in Blumenau), athlete, actress, composer and sports reporter
- Ana Amorim Taleska, (born 1983 in Blumenau) handball player
- Christian Maicon Hening, (born 1978 in Blumenau) football player
- Eduarda Amorim Taleska, (born 1986 in Blumenau) handball player
- Rafael Schmitz, (born 1980 in Blumenau) football player
- Barbara Bruch, (born 1987 in Blumenau) female volleyball player
- Jean Carlo Witte, (born 1977 in Blumenau) football player
- Nathan Allan de Souza, (born 1996 in Blumenau) football player
- Teco Padaratz, (born 1971 in Blumenau) former surfer, two-times champion of the WQS.

== Twin towns – sister cities ==
Blumenau is twinned with:

- Bariloche, Argentina
- Campinas, Brazil
- Osorno, Chile
- Petrópolis, Brazil
- Weingarten, Germany
- Posadas, Argentina
- Badajoz, Spain
- Oxapampa, Peru

== See also ==
- Colonia Tovar
- Timbó
- Villa General Belgrano
