= 2022 Ceará general election =

2022 Ceará Gubernatorial election
- 2 October 2022 (first round)
- Opinion polls
Governor before election
Izolda Cela
PDT
Elected Governor
Elmano de Freitas
PT
- Gubernatorial election
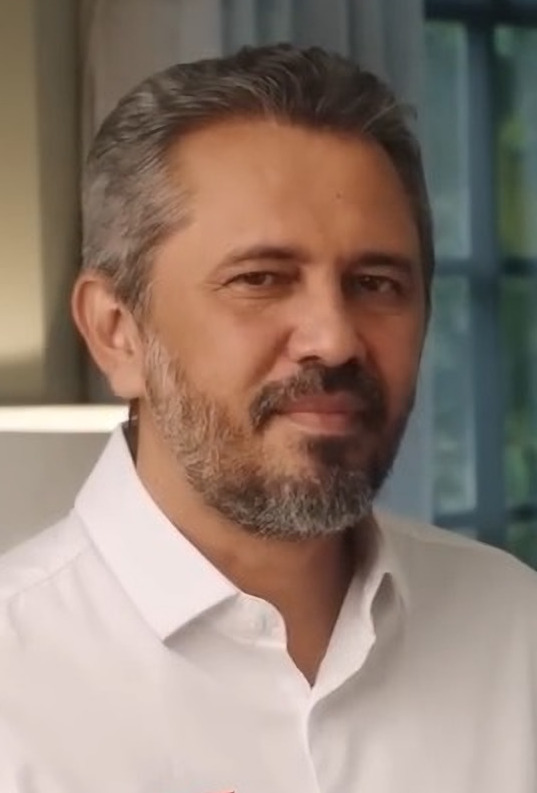

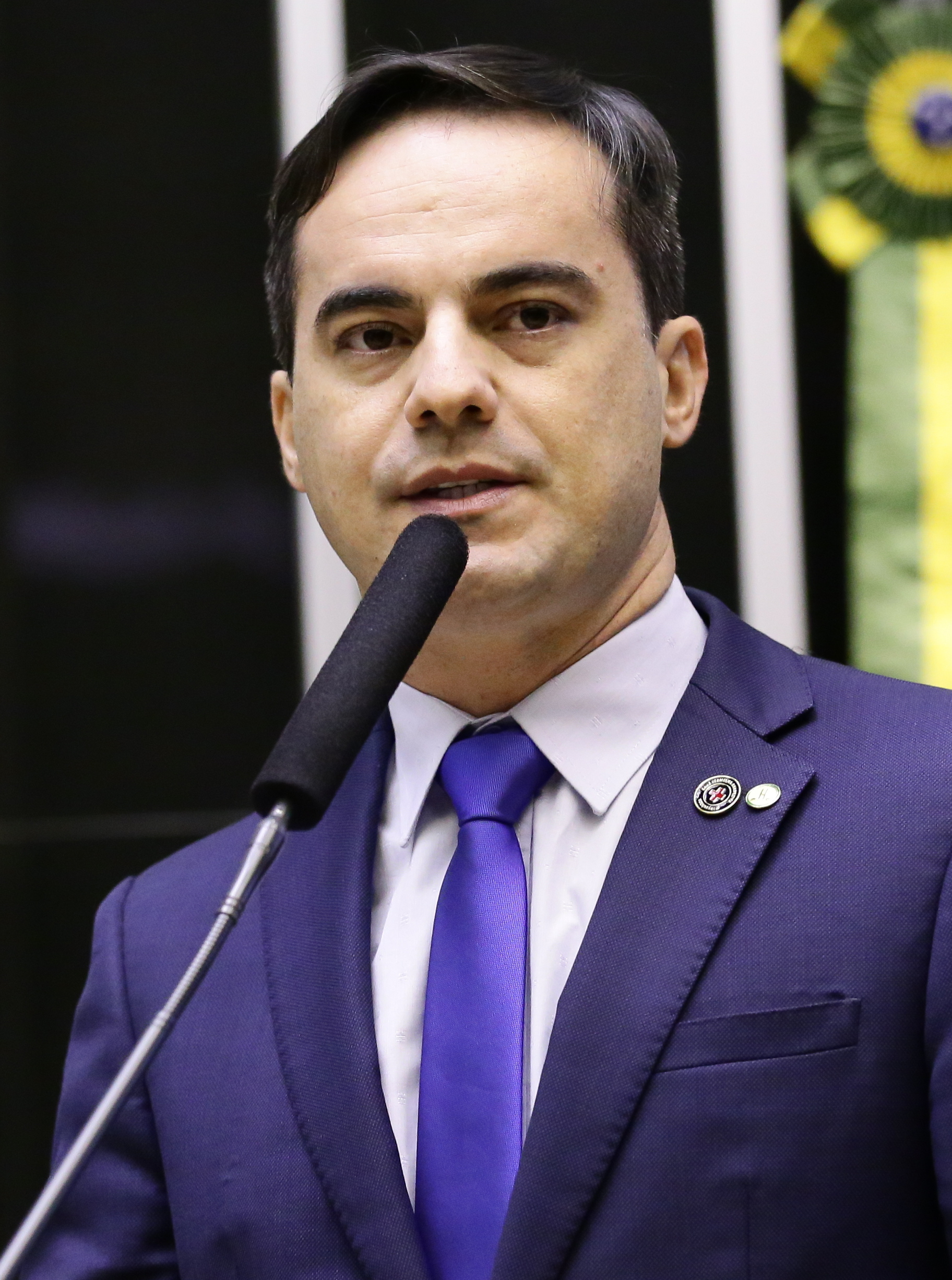

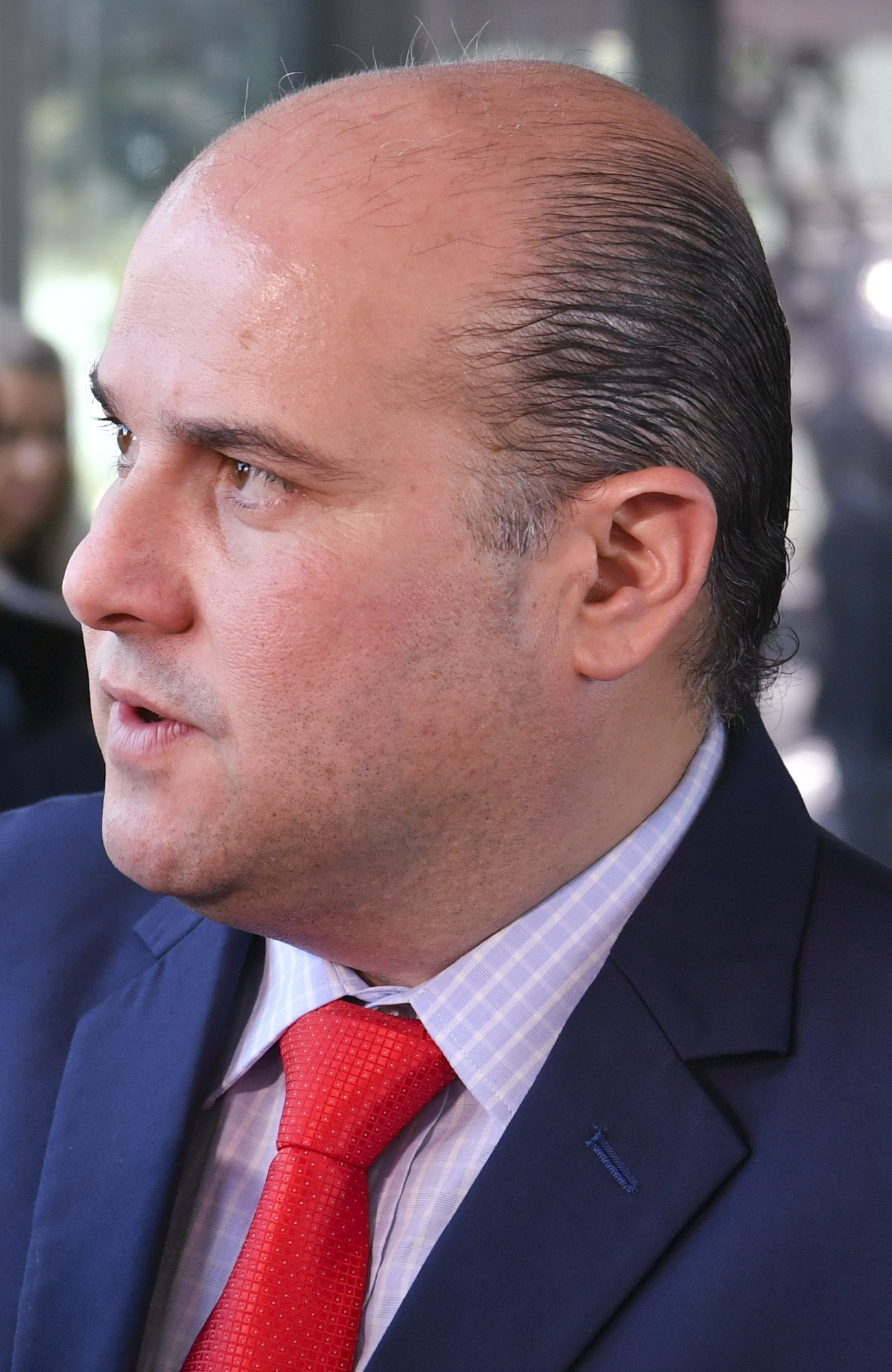
Candidate	Elmano de Freitas	Wagner Sousa	Roberto Cláudio
Party	PT	UNIÃO	PDT
Alliance	Ceará Gets Stronger	Union for Ceará	From the People, By the People and For the People
Running mate	Jade Romero (MDB)	Raimundo Matos (PL)	Domingos Filho (PSD)
Popular vote	2,808,300	1,649,213	734,976
Percentage	54.02%	31.72%	14.14%
- Senatorial election
- 2 October 2022 (one-only round)
- Opinion polls
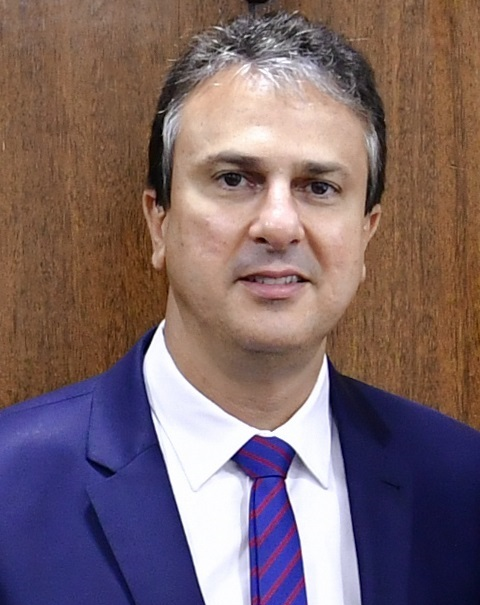

Candidate	Camilo Santana	Kamila Cardoso
Party	PT	Avante
Alliance	Ceará Gets Stronger	Union for Ceará
Popular vote	3,389,513	1,273,272
Percentage	69.80%	26.22%
Senator before election
Tasso Jereissati
PSDB
Elected Senator
Camilo Santana
PT

The 2022 Ceara Gubernatorial election was held in the state of Ceará, Brazil on Sunday 2 October. Voters elected the President and Vice President of the Republic, a Governor, Vice Governor of the State and a Senator of the Republic with two alternates, in addition to 22 Federal Deputies and 46 State Deputies. Those elected will take office on 1 January (President, Governor and their respective vices) or 1 February (senator and deputies) of 2023 for terms on office lasting for four years (except in the case of the senator, who'll have a term on office for eight years).

The incumbent governor, Izolda Cela, who became governor after the resignation of Camilo Santana (PT) is affiliated to the Democratic Labour Party (PDT). She was eligible for a second term, but the party's nominee was Roberto Cláudio, after an internal dispute where the former mayor of Fortaleza won. For the election to the Federal Senate, the seat occupied by Tasso Jereissati, elected in 2014 by the Brazilian Social Democracy Party (PSDB), was at dispute. However, the senator said he would not run for reelection.

== Electoral calendar ==
Note: This section only presents the main dates of the 2022 electoral calendar, check the TSE official website (in Portuguese) and other official sources for detailed information.

Electoral calendar
15 May	Start of crowdfunding of candidates
20 July to 5 August	Party conventions for choosing candidates and coalitions
16 August to 30 September	Period of exhibition of free electoral propaganda on radio, television and on the internet related to the first round
2 October	First round of 2022 elections
7 October to 28 October	Period of exhibition of free electoral propaganda on radio, television and on the internet related to a possible second round
30 October	Possible second round of 2022 elections
until 19 December	Delivery of electoral diplomas for those who were elected in the 2022 elections by the Brazilian Election Justice

== Gubernatorial candidates ==
The party conventions began on 20 July and will continue until 5 August. The following political parties have already confirmed their candidacies. Political parties have until 15 August 2022, to formally register their candidates.

=== Confirmed candidacies ===
Party	Candidate	Most recent political office or occupation	Party	Running mate	Coalition	Electoral number	TV time per party/coalition	Refs.
Democratic Labour Party (PDT)	Roberto Cláudio	Mayor of Fortaleza (2013–2021)	Social Democratic Party (PSD)	Domingos Filho	From the People, By the People and For the People: Democratic Labour Party (PDT); Brazilian Socialist Party (PSB); Social Democratic Party (PSD); Party of National Mobilization (PMN); Patriota (PATRI); Act (AGIR); Brazilian Woman's Party (PMB); Social Christian Party (PSC); Christian Democracy (DC)	12	2min and 31sec	
Workers' Party (PT)	Elmano de Freitas	State Deputy of Ceará (since 2015)	Brazilian Democratic Movement (MDB)	Jade Romero	Ceara Gets Stronger: Brazil of Hope; Workers' Party (PT); Communist Party of Brazil (PCdoB); Green Party (PV); Progressistas (PP); Brazilian Democratic Movement (MDB); Brazilian Labour Renewal Party (PRTB); PSOL-REDE; Socialism and Liberty Party (PSOL); Sustainability Network (REDE); Solidariedade (SD)	13	3min and 37sec	
Brazil Union (UNIÃO)	Capitão Wagner	Federal Deputy from Ceará (since 2019)	Liberal Party (PL)	Raimundo Matos	Union for Ceará: Brazil Union (UNIÃO); Avante; Brazilian Labour Party (PTB); Republicans; Liberal Party (PL); Podemos (PODE); Republican Party of the Social Order (PROS)	44	3min and 51sec	
Brazilian Communist Party (PCB)	Chico Malta	Lawyer and former bank officer.	Brazilian Communist Party (PCB)	Nauri Araújo	—	21	—	
Popular Unity (UP)	Serley Leal	Bank officer.	Popular Unity (UP)	Francisco Bita Tapeba	—	80	—	
United Socialist Workers' Party (PSTU)	Zé Batista	Public employee.	United Socialist Workers' Party (PSTU)	Reginaldo	—	16	—	
The television time reserved for political propaganda for each election will be distributed among all parties and coalitions that have a candidate and representation in the Chamber of Deputies.							Total: 10 minutes	

=== Withdrawn candidacies ===
- Evandro Leitão (PDT) - State deputy of Ceará (since 2015) and President of the Legislative Assembly of Ceará (2021–2022). He had previously declared that he was working with the intention of his own re-election as a state deputy. In April, he signaled support for the candidacy of the governor of Ceará, Izolda Cela.
- Mauro Benevides Filho (PDT) - Federal deputy from Ceará and state deputy of Ceará (1991–2015). He announced the withdrawal of his candidacy in the name of an internal unity in the party.
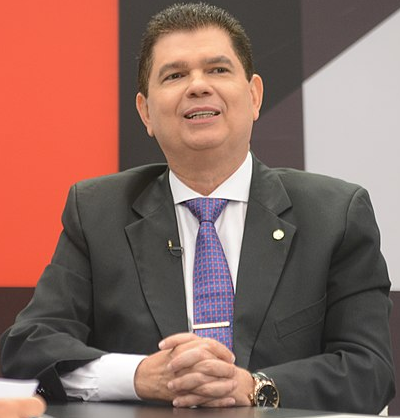
State deputy of Ceará
Mauro Benevides Filho (PDT)
(1991–2015)

== Senatorial candidates ==
Political parties have until 15 August 2022, to formally register their candidates.

=== Confirmed candidacies ===
Party	Candidate	Most recent political office or occupation	Party	Candidates for Alternate Senators	Coalition	Electoral number	TV time per party/coalition	Ref.
Workers' Party (PT)	Camilo Santana	Governor of Ceará (2015–2022)	Workers' Party (PT)	1st alternate: Augusta Brito	Ceara Gets Stronger: Brazil of Hope; Workers' Party (PT); Communist Party of Brazil (PCdoB); Green Party (PV); Progressistas (PP); Brazilian Democratic Movement (MDB); Brazilian Labour Renewal Party (PRTB); PSOL-REDE; Socialism and Liberty Party (PSOL); Sustainability Network (REDE); Solidariedade (SD)	131	1min and 48sec	
Workers' Party (PT)	Camilo Santana	Governor of Ceará (2015–2022)	Workers' Party (PT)	2nd alternate: Janaina Freitas	Ceara Gets Stronger: Brazil of Hope; Workers' Party (PT); Communist Party of Brazil (PCdoB); Green Party (PV); Progressistas (PP); Brazilian Democratic Movement (MDB); Brazilian Labour Renewal Party (PRTB); PSOL-REDE; Socialism and Liberty Party (PSOL); Sustainability Network (REDE); Solidariedade (SD)	131	1min and 48sec	
Social Democratic Party (PSD)	Érika Amorim	State Deputy of Ceará (since 2019)	Democratic Labour Party (PDT)	1st alternate: Mônica Aguiar	From the People, By the People and For the People: Democratic Labour Party (PDT); Brazilian Socialist Party (PSB); Social Democratic Party (PSD); Party of National Mobilization (PMN); Patriota (PATRI); Act (AGIR); Brazilian Woman's Party (PMB); Social Christian Party (PSC); Christian Democracy (DC)	555	1min and 15sec	
Social Democratic Party (PSD)	Érika Amorim	State Deputy of Ceará (since 2019)	Democratic Labour Party (PDT)	2nd alternate: Diana Carvalho	From the People, By the People and For the People: Democratic Labour Party (PDT); Brazilian Socialist Party (PSB); Social Democratic Party (PSD); Party of National Mobilization (PMN); Patriota (PATRI); Act (AGIR); Brazilian Woman's Party (PMB); Social Christian Party (PSC); Christian Democracy (DC)	555	1min and 15sec	
Avante	Kamila Cardoso	Lawyer and candidate for Vice Mayor of Fortaleza in 2020 Brazilian general election.	Republicans	1st alternate: Gelson Ferraz	Union for Ceará: Brazil Union (UNIÃO); Avante; Brazilian Labour Party (PTB); Republicans; Liberal Party (PL); Podemos (PODE); Republican Party of the Social Order (PROS)	700	1min and 55sec	
Avante	Kamila Cardoso	Lawyer and candidate for Vice Mayor of Fortaleza in 2020 Brazilian general election.	Brazilian Labour Party (PTB)	2nd alternate: Pastor Paixão	Union for Ceará: Brazil Union (UNIÃO); Avante; Brazilian Labour Party (PTB); Republicans; Liberal Party (PL); Podemos (PODE); Republican Party of the Social Order (PROS)	700	1min and 55sec	
The television time reserved for political propaganda for each election will be distributed among all parties and coalitions that have a candidate and representation in the Chamber of Deputies.							Total: 5 minutes	

=== Rejected candidacies ===
Party	Candidate	Most recent political office or occupation	Party	Candidates for Alternate Senators	Electoral number	Ref.
United Socialist Workers' Party (PSTU)	Carlos Silva	Construction worker.	United Socialist Workers' Party (PSTU)	1st alternate: Félix	160	
United Socialist Workers' Party (PSTU)	Carlos Silva	Construction worker.	United Socialist Workers' Party (PSTU)	2nd alternate: Maria do Carmo	160	

- Carlos Silva: His candidacy was rejected because he did not report to the Brazilian Election Justice about previous electoral expenses in his campaign for the prefecture of the Ceará municipality of Iguatu in 2020. However, an appeal was filed against the decision and the candidate remains, until the moment, eligible to run in the election.

=== Withdrawn candidacies ===
Party	Candidate	Most recent political office or occupation	Party	Candidates for Alternate Senators	Coalition	Electoral number	Ref.
Brazilian Social Democracy Party (PSDB)	Amarílio Macedo	Businessman	Brazilian Social Democracy Party (PSDB)	1st alternate: Dr. Cabeto	From the People, By the People and For the People: Always Forward; Brazilian Social Democracy Party (PSDB); Cidadania; Democratic Labour Party (PDT); Brazilian Socialist Party (PSB); Social Democratic Party (PSD); Party of National Mobilization (PMN); Patriota (PATRI); Act (AGIR); Brazilian Woman's Party (PMB); Social Christian Party (PSC); Christian Democracy (DC)	456	
Brazilian Social Democracy Party (PSDB)	Amarílio Macedo	Businessman	Cidadania	2nd alternate: Regis	From the People, By the People and For the People: Always Forward; Brazilian Social Democracy Party (PSDB); Cidadania; Democratic Labour Party (PDT); Brazilian Socialist Party (PSB); Social Democratic Party (PSD); Party of National Mobilization (PMN); Patriota (PATRI); Act (AGIR); Brazilian Woman's Party (PMB); Social Christian Party (PSC); Christian Democracy (DC)	456	
Democratic Labour Party (PDT)	Nurse Ana Paula	Councillor of Fortaleza (since 2021)	Democratic Labour Party (PDT)	1st alternate: Mônica Aguiar	From the People, By the People and For the People: Democratic Labour Party (PDT); Brazilian Socialist Party (PSB); Social Democratic Party (PSD); Party of National Mobilization (PMN); Patriota (PATRI); Act (AGIR); Brazilian Woman's Party (PMB); Social Christian Party (PSC); Christian Democracy (DC)	123	
Democratic Labour Party (PDT)	Nurse Ana Paula	Councillor of Fortaleza (since 2021)	Democratic Labour Party (PDT)	2nd alternate: Diana Carvalho	From the People, By the People and For the People: Democratic Labour Party (PDT); Brazilian Socialist Party (PSB); Social Democratic Party (PSD); Party of National Mobilization (PMN); Patriota (PATRI); Act (AGIR); Brazilian Woman's Party (PMB); Social Christian Party (PSC); Christian Democracy (DC)	123	
Socialism and Liberty Party (PSOL)	Paulo Anacé	Indigenous leader and activist from Caucaia, Ceará.	Socialism and Liberty Party (PSOL)	1st alternate: Teacher Walter Rebouças	PSOL-REDE; Socialism and Liberty Party (PSOL); Sustainability Network (REDE)	500	
Socialism and Liberty Party (PSOL)	Paulo Anacé	Indigenous leader and activist from Caucaia, Ceará.	Socialism and Liberty Party (PSOL)	2nd alternate: Teacher Analberto	PSOL-REDE; Socialism and Liberty Party (PSOL); Sustainability Network (REDE)	500	

- Amarílio Macedo: Initially, the directory in Ceará of the Always Forward federation (composed by the Brazilian Social Democracy Party and Cidadania), under the command of Chiquinho Feitosa, one of the alternate senators of Tasso Jereissati, held a convention that defined the neutrality of the federation in the gubernatorial and senatorial elections. However, the federation's national directory, influenced by Jereissati, who obtained control of the state directory, intervened in the decision and launched the senate candidacy of the businessman Amarílio Macêdo in the From the People, By the People and For the People coalition, an alliance that also supported Roberto Cláudio's candidacy for the state government, with Dr. Cabeto and Regis as the nominees for alternate senators. But later, the Superior Electoral Court of Brazil suspended the resolution that approved Macêdo's name in the ticket, reinstating the previous decision and returning the command of the directory to Feitosa, implying the exclusion of the Always Forward federation from the coalition.
- Nurse Ana Paula: She had her candidacy for the Senate announced by the Democratic Labour Party to replace the candidacy of Amarílio Macêdo if he could not represent the coalition, but she chose to withdraw to run for the federal deputy, and Érika Amorim was chosen as a candidate by Roberto Cláudio's campaign.
- Paulo Anacé: He had his candidacy for the Senate announced, but resigned due to the decision of the PSOL REDE Federation to support Camilo Santana's candidacy. With that, he decided to run in the dispute for the position of federal deputy for Ceará.

== Legislative Assembly ==
The result of the last state election and the current situation in the Legislative Assembly of Ceará is given below:

Affiliation	Members		+/–
Affiliation	Elected	Current	+/–
PDT	14	13	▼1
PT	4	7	▲3
MDB	4	6	▲2
UNIÃO	New	3	▲3
Republicanos	1	3	▲2
PL	1	2	▲1
PSD	2	2	Steady
Solidarity	2	2	Steady
PP	3	2	▼1
PV	0	1	▲1
DEM	1	1	Steady
PSOL	1	1	Steady
PSDB	2	1	▼1
PCdoB	2	1	▼1
Patriota	3	1	▼2
PSB	1	0	▼1
Cidadania	1	0	▼1
PROS	2	0	▼2
PSL	2	0	▼2
Total	46		–

== Opinion polls ==
=== First round ===
The first round is scheduled to take place on 2 October 2022.

2022

Pollster/client(s)	Date(s) conducted	Sample size	Wagner UNIÃO	Cláudio PDT	Elmano PT	Leal UP	Batista PSTU	Others	Abst. Undec.	Lead
2022 Election Results	2 Oct 2022	5.198.892	31,72%	14,14%	54,02%	0,04%	0,03%	0,06% (Note: Chico Malta (PCB) with 0,06%)	7,55%	22,3%
IPEC	29 Sep–1 Oct 2022	1.200	37%	18%	44%	0%	0%	–	–	7%
IPEC	29 Sep–1 Oct 2022	1.200	33%	17%	40%	0%	0%	–	9%	7%
IPESPE	28–30 Sep 2022	1.000	37%	23%	39%	–	1%	–	–	2%
IPESPE	28–30 Sep 2022	1.000	31%	20%	33%	–	1%	–	15%	2%
Atlas/Intel	26–30 Sep 2022	1.600	32,6%	18,9%	48,4%	–	–	–	–	15,8%
Atlas/Intel	26–30 Sep 2022	1.600	31,5%	18,3%	46,7%	–	–	–	3,4%	15,2%
Invox Brasil	23–29 Sep 2022	1.600	28%	27%	29%	–	–	1% (Note: Chico Malta (PCB) with 1%)	15%	1%
Real Time Big Data	28–29 Sep 2022	1.000	32%	18%	39%	0%	0%	–	11%	7%
Real Time Big Data	28–29 Sep 2022	1.000	36%	20%	44%	0%	0%	–	–	8%
Atlas/Intel	24–28 Sep 2022	1.600	33,6%	20,8%	45,1%	–	–	–	–	11,5%
Atlas/Intel	24–28 Sep 2022	1.600	32,4%	20,1%	43,6%	–	–	–	3,4%	11,2%
Paraná Pesquisas	23–27 Sep 2022	1.540	33,1%	18,8%	33,3%	0,3%	0,3%	0,8% (Note: Chico Malta (PCB) with 0,8%)	13,4%	0,2%
Simplex	22–27 Sep 2022	4.266	32%	14%	37%	–	–	–	16%	5%
Atlas/Intel	17–22 Sep 2022	1.600	38,7%	17,6%	33,5%	0,3%	–	–	10%	5,2%
Real Time Big Data	21–22 Sep 2022	1.000	31%	20%	31%	0%	1%	1% (Note: Chico Malta (PCB) with 1%)	16%	Tie
IPEC	19–21 Sep 2022	1.200	35%	27%	36%	0%	1%	1% (Note: Chico Malta (PCB) with 1%)	–	1%
IPEC	19–21 Sep 2022	1.200	29%	22%	30%	0%	1%	1% (Note: Chico Malta (PCB) with 1%)	17%	1%
IPESPE	18–20 Sep 2022	1.000	37%	19%	28%	0%	0%	1% (Note: Chico Malta (PCB) with 1%)	16%	9%
Invox Brasil	12–18 Sep 2022	1.600	33%	26%	22%	–	–	1% (Note: Chico Malta (PCB) with 1%)	17%	7%
Paraná Pesquisas	8–12 Sep 2022	1.540	36,8%	24,4%	23,3%	0,1%	1,3%	0,4% (Note: Chico Malta (PCB) with 0,4%)	13,7%	12,4%
Real Time Big Data	10–12 Sep 2022	1.000	36%	22%	26%	0%	0%	–	16%	10%
Invox Brasil	6–12 Sep 2022	1.604	34%	26%	21%	–	1%	–	18%	8%
IPESPE	9–11 Sep 2022	1.000	36%	22%	23%	0%	1%	1% (Note: Chico Malta (PCB) with 1%)	17%	14%
IPEC	6–8 Sep 2022	1.200	35%	21%	22%	–	1%	1% (Note: Chico Malta (PCB) with 1%)	21%	13%
Paraná Pesquisas	31 Aug–4 Sep 2022	1.540	37,5%	24,3%	20,9%	0,2%	1,5%	0,6% (Note: Chico Malta (PCB) with 0,6%)	15%	13,2%
IPEC	29–31 Aug 2022	1.200	32%	28%	19%	2%	1%	0% (Note: Chico Malta (PCB) with 0%)	20%	4%
Invox Brasil	24–28 Aug 2022	1.601	37%	26%	16%	–	1%	1% (Note: Chico Malta (PCB) with 1%)	17%	11%
Atlas/Intel	23–26 Aug 2022	1.600	40,5%	18,9%	27,1%	0,1%	0,4%	0,1% (Note: Chico Malta (PCB) with 0,1%)	12,9%	13,4%
IPESPE	20–23 Aug 2022	1.000	37%	25%	20%	–	1%	1% (Note: Chico Malta (PCB) with 1%)	17%	12%
Real Time Big Data	19–20 Aug 2022	1.000	38%	25%	24%	–	1%	–	12%	13%
Paraná Pesquisas	8–12 Aug 2022	1.540	40,1%	22,3%	17,7%	0,3%	0,1%	0,5% (Note: Chico Malta (PCB) with 0,5%)	18,9%	17,8%
Instituto Verita	2–6 Aug 2022	2.040	38,6%	20,1%	19%	0,2%	0,5%	8,7% (Note: Adelita Monteiro (PSOL) with 2% - she withdrew her candidacy on 3 August 2022; Chico Malta (PCB) with 1,3% and others (unspecified) with 5,4%)	12,9%	18,5%
Real Time Big Data	2–3 Aug 2022	1.500	35%	26%	20%	0%	0%	1% (Note: Adelita Monteiro (PSOL) with 1% - she withdrew her candidacy on 3 August 2022)	17%	9%
Real Time Big Data	2–3 Aug 2022	1.500	35%	26%	21%	–	–	–	18%	9%
Real Time Big Data	2–3 Aug 2022	1.500	34%	25%	30%	–	–	(Note: Possible electoral cenario where Capitão Wagner (UNIÃO) is supported by the presidential candidate Jair Bolsonaro (PL); Roberto Cláudio (PDT) is supported by Ciro Gomes (PDT) and Elmano de Freitas (PT) is supported by Lula (PT).)	11%	4%
IPESPE	30 Jul–2 Aug 2022	1.000	38%	28%	13%	0%	1%	1% (Note: Adelita Monteiro (PSOL) with 1% - she withdrew her candidacy on 3 August 2022)	19%	10%
18 July 2022 – 30 July 2022	Roberto Cláudio defeats governor Izolda Cela in an internal dispute and is chosen as the Democratic Labour Party nominee for the government of Ceará. Elmano de Freitas is announced as the Workers' Party nominee for the government. Adelita Monteiro withdraws her candidacy.									
Pollster/client(s)	Date(s) conducted	Sample size	Wagner UNIÃO	Cláudio PDT	Mauro PDT	Izolda PDT	Adelita PSOL	Others	Abst. Undec.	Lead
Paraná Pesquisas	11–15 Jul 2022	1.540	45,4%	–	–	26,8%	3%	0,8% (Note: Serley Leal (UP) with 0,8%)	24,1%	18,6%
Paraná Pesquisas	11–15 Jul 2022	1.540	44,5%	29,2%	–	–	3,5%	0,8% (Note: Serley Leal (UP) with 0,8%)	22%	15,3%
Vox Populi	10–13 Jul 2022	1.304	39%	37%	–	–	–	–	24%	2%
Vox Populi	10–13 Jul 2022	1.304	48%	–	–	28%	–	–	24%	20%
Vox Populi	10–13 Jul 2022	1.304	30%			52%	–	(Note: Electoral scenario where Izolda Cela (PDT) is supported by the presidential candidates, Lula (PT) and Ciro Gomes (PDT); and also by the former governors of Ceará, Camilo Santana (PT) and Cid Gomes (PDT).)	18%	22%
Quaest	27 Jun–1 Jul 2022	1.500	44%	40%	–	–	–	–	15%	4%
Quaest	27 Jun–1 Jul 2022	1.500	52%	–	–	30%	–	–	18%	22%
Quaest	27 Jun–1 Jul 2022	1.500	55%	–	23%	–	–	–	22%	32%
Quaest	27 Jun–1 Jul 2022	1.500	59%	–	–	–	–	17% (Note: Evandro Leitão (PDT) with 17%)	24%	42%
Real Time Big Data	18–20 Jun 2022	1.500	40%	35%	–	–	2%	(Note: Serley Leal (UP) with 0%)	23%	5%
Real Time Big Data	18–20 Jun 2022	1.500	44%	–	–	29%	2%	(Note: Serley Leal (UP) with 0%)	25%	15%
Real Time Big Data	18–20 Jun 2022	1.500	49%	–	–	–	3%	11% (Note: Evandro Leitão (PDT) with 11% and Serley Leal (UP) with 0%)	37%	38%
Real Time Big Data	18–20 Jun 2022	1.500	45%	–	19%	–	3%	(Note: Serley Leal (UP) with 0%)	33%	26%
Instituto Conectar	31 May–4 Jun 2022	1.500	29%	23%	–	–	2%	34% (Note: Eunício Oliveira (MDB) with 34% - in a scenario where he is supported by the presidential candidate Lula (PT). In this scenario, Jair Bolsonaro (PL) would support the candidacy of Capitão Wagner (UNIÃO) for the government of Ceará and Ciro Gomes and his brother Cid Gomes (PDT) would support Roberto Cláudio (PDT).)	12%	5%
Instituto Conectar	31 May–4 Jun 2022	1.500	30%	–	–	15%	2%	40% (Note: Eunício Oliveira (MDB) with 40% - in a scenario where he is supported by the presidential candidate Lula (PT). In this scenario, Jair Bolsonaro (PL) would support the candidacy of Capitão Wagner (UNIÃO) for the government of Ceará and Ciro Gomes and his brother Cid Gomes (PDT) would support Izolda Cela (PDT).)	13%	10%
Paraná Pesquisas	1–6 May 2022	1.540	46,5%	–	–	24,2%	3,2%	–	26,1%	22,3%
Paraná Pesquisas	1–6 May 2022	1.540	43,4%	29,8%	–	–	2,9%	–	23,8%	13,6%
Instituto Invox Brasil	22–25 Apr 2022	1.602	37%	39%	–	–	5%	–	19%	2%
Instituto Invox Brasil	22–25 Apr 2022	1.602	45%	–	23%	–	8%	–	24%	22%
Instituto Invox Brasil	22–25 Apr 2022	1.602	48%	–	–	23%	10%	–	19%	25%
Instituto Invox Brasil	22–25 Apr 2022	1.602	51%	–	–	–	12%	13% (Note: Evandro Leitão (PDT) with 13%)	24%	38%
Pollster/client(s)	Date(s) conducted	Sample size	Wagner UNIÃO	Cláudio PDT	Feitosa PSDB	Izolda PDT	Girão PODE	Others	Abst. Undec.	Lead
Real Time Big Data	21–22 Mar 2022	1,000	27%	–	34%	–	8%	(Note: Electoral scenario where Chiquinho Feitosa (PSDB) is supported by presidential candidate Lula (PT), by former governor Camilo Santana (PT) and presidential candidate Ciro Gomes (PDT). Also in this scenario, Capitão Wagner (UNIÃO) is supported by presidential candidate Jair Bolsonaro (PL) and Eduardo Girão (PODE) would support the candidacy of Sergio Moro.)	31%	7%
Real Time Big Data	21–22 Mar 2022	1,000	25%	42%	–	–	7%	(Note: Electoral scenario where Roberto Cláudio (PDT) is supported by presidential candidate Lula (PT), by former governor Camilo Santana (PT) and presidential candidate Ciro Gomes (PDT). Also in this scenario, Capitão Wagner (UNIÃO) is supported by presidential candidate Jair Bolsonaro (PL) and Eduardo Girão (PODE) would support the candidacy of Sergio Moro.)	26%	17%
Real Time Big Data	21–22 Mar 2022	1,000	27%	–	–	33%	8%	(Note: Electoral scenario where Izolda Cela (PDT) is supported by presidential candidate Lula (PT), by former governor Camilo Santana (PT) and presidential candidate Ciro Gomes (PDT). Also in this scenario, Capitão Wagner (UNIÃO) is supported by presidential candidate Jair Bolsonaro (PL) and Eduardo Girão (PODE) would support the candidacy of Sergio Moro.)	32%	6%
22 March 2022	Capitão Wagner leaves the Republican Party of the Social Order (PROS) and decides to join Brazil Union (UNIÃO).									

2021

Pollster/client(s)	Date(s) conducted	Sample size	Wagner PROS	Cláudio PDT	Mauro PDT	Airton PT	Lopes PSOL	Others	Abst. Undec.	Lead
Paraná Pesquisas	11–15 Sep 2021	1.540	44,9%	–	13,1%	5,7%	4%	–	32,4%	31,8%
Paraná Pesquisas	11–15 Sep 2021	1.540	45,9%	–	–	6,7%	4,1%	8% (Note: Evandro Leitão (PDT) with 8%)	35,3%	37,9%
Paraná Pesquisas	11–15 Sep 2021	1.540	42,6%	26,2%	–	4,6%	2,6%	–	24,1%	16,4%
Pollster/client(s)	Date(s) conducted	Sample size	Wagner PROS	Cid PDT	Cláudio PDT	Lins PT	Lopes PSOL	Others	Abst. Undec.	Lead
Instituto Ranking	29 Jul–2 Aug 2021	2.000	28,2%	30,1%	12%	5%	–	9,6% (Note: Eduardo Girão (PODE) with 8,3% and Mauro Filho (PDT) with 1,3%)	15,1%	1,9%
Instituto Ranking	29 Jul–2 Aug 2021	2.000	38,15%	41,5%	–	–	–	–	20,35%	3,35%
Paraná Pesquisas	25–29 Jun 2021	1.528	35,1%	38%	–	10,2%	0,7%	–	15,9%	2,9%
Paraná Pesquisas	25–29 Jun 2021	1.528	39,1%	–	24,1%	14,4%	1,8%	–	20,7%	15%
Paraná Pesquisas	25–29 Jun 2021	1.528	42,8%	–	–	20,9%	1,9%	8,6% (Note: Mauro Filho (PDT) with 8,6%)	25,8%	21,9%

=== Senator ===
2022

Pollster/client(s)	Date(s) conducted	Sample size	Camilo PT	Paixão PTB	Mendes AVANTE	Carlos PSTU	Bardawil PL	Others	Abst. Undec.	Lead
Paraná Pesquisas	11–15 Jul 2022	1.540	65,3%	3,3%	2,7%	2,3%	1,2%	–	25,2%	62%
Vox Populi	10–13 Jul 2022	1.304	68%	4%	1%	–	3%	–	23%	64%
1 July 2022	The United Socialist Workers' Party (PSTU) launches candidacies for the Government of Ceará and the Federal Senate.									
Pollster/client(s)	Date(s) conducted	Sample size	Camilo PT	Paixão PTB	Mendes AVANTE	Matos PL	Bardawil PL	Others	Abst. Undec.	Lead
Real Time Big Data	18–20 Jun 2022	1.500	67%	3%	3%	–	1%	–	26%	64%
Real Time Big Data	18–20 Jun 2022	1.500	66%	2%	2%	6%	–	–	24%	60%
Paraná Pesquisas	1–6 May 2022	1.540	66,8%	2,7%	3%	–	0,5%	–	27%	63,8%
Paraná Pesquisas	1–6 May 2022	1.540	66,2%	2,5%	2,7%	2,8%	–	–	25,9%	63,4%

2021

Pollster/client(s)	Date(s) conducted	Sample size	Camilo PT	Tasso PSDB	Domingos PSD	Anna PSOL	Arruda Ind.	Others	Abst. Undec.	Lead
Paraná Pesquisas	11–15 Sep 2021	1.540	54%	17,7%	3,3%	1%	–	6,5% (Note: Dr.ª Mayra (Ind.) with 6% and Gaudencio Lucena with 0,5% (MDB))	17,5%	36,3%
Instituto Ranking	29 Jul–2 Aug 2021	2.000	42%	26,15%	4,05%	3%	4,2%	–	20,6%	15,85%
Paraná Pesquisas	25–29 Jun 2021	1.528	53,7%	22,5%	4,2%	1,8%	–	–	17,8%	31,2%
Paraná Pesquisas	25–29 Jun 2021	1.528	53,9%	23,1%	–	2%	3,7%	–	17,3%	30,8%

== Results ==
=== Governor ===
Candidate	Running mate	Party	Votes	%
Elmano de Freitas	Jade Romero (MDB)	PT	2,808,300	54.02
Wagner Sousa	Raimundo Matos (PL)	UNIÃO	1,649,213	31.72
Roberto Cláudio	Domingos Filho (PSD)	PDT	734,976	14.14
Chico Malta	Nauri Araújo	PCB	3,015	0.06
Serley Leal	Francisco Bita	UP	1,881	0.04
José Batista	Reginaldo Araújo	PSTU	1,507	0.03
Total			5,198,892	100.00
Valid votes			5,198,892	92.45
Invalid votes			249,099	4.43
Blank votes			175,459	3.12
Total votes			5,623,450	100.00
Registered voters/turnout			6,820,673	82.45
PT gain from PDT				

Popular vote
Freitas	54.02%
Wagner	31.72%
Cláudio	14.14%
Others	0.11%

=== Senator ===
Candidate	Party	Votes	%
Camilo Santana	PT	3,389,513	69.80
Kamila Cardoso	Avante	1,273,272	26.22
Erika Amorim	PSD	193,243	3.98
Total		4,856,028	100.00
Valid votes		4,856,028	86.35
Invalid votes		454,152	8.08
Blank votes		313,270	5.57
Total votes		5,623,450	100.00
Registered voters/turnout		6,820,673	82.45
PT gain from PSDB			

Popular vote
Santana	69.80%
Cardoso	26.22%
Amorim	3.98%

=== Chamber of Deputies ===
Party or alliance		Votes	%	Seats	+/–
Liberal Party		1,058,947	20.73	5	▲4
Democratic Labour Party		975,407	19.09	5	▼1
Brazil Union		719,801	14.09	4	New
Social Democratic Party		621,809	12.17	3	▲2
Brazil of Hope	Workers' Party	562,457	11.01	3	Steady
Brazil of Hope	Communist Party of Brazil	51,167	1.00	0	Steady
Brazil of Hope	Green Party	5,668	0.11	0	▼1
Brazilian Democratic Movement		259,545	5.08	1	Steady
Progressistas		225,463	4.41	1	Steady
Republicanos		179,371	3.51	0	Steady
Brazilian Socialist Party		169,478	3.32	0	▼1
PSOL REDE	Socialism and Liberty Party	124,879	2.44	0	Steady
PSOL REDE	Sustainability Network	4,553	0.09	0	Steady
Avante		36,800	0.72	0	Steady
Always Forward	Brazilian Social Democracy Party	31,076	0.61	0	▼1
Always Forward	Cidadania	23,499	0.46	0	Steady
Social Christian Party		11,900	0.23	0	Steady
Party of National Mobilization		11,061	0.22	0	Steady
Brazilian Labour Party		6,814	0.13	0	▼1
Podemos		5,701	0.11	0	Steady
Brazilian Communist Party		5,652	0.11	0	Steady
Patriota		4,551	0.09	0	▼1
Republican Party of the Social Order		3,722	0.07	0	▼2
Agir		3,030	0.06	0	Steady
Brazilian Woman's Party		2,746	0.05	0	Steady
Popular Unity		2,327	0.05	0	New
Workers' Cause Party		815	0.02	0	Steady
Total		5,108,239	100.00	22	–
Valid votes		5,108,239	90.84		
Invalid votes		219,629	3.91		
Blank votes		295,582	5.26		
Total votes		5,623,450	100.00		
Registered voters/turnout		6,820,673	82.45		

=== Legislative Assembly ===
Party or alliance		Votes	%	Seats	+/–
Democratic Labour Party		1,238,562	24.50	13	▼1
Brazil of Hope	Workers' Party	807,069	15.97	8	▲4
Brazil of Hope	Communist Party of Brazil	106,435	2.11	1	▼1
Brazil of Hope	Green Party	37,069	0.73	0	Steady
Liberal Party		495,261	9.80	4	▲1
Brazil Union		406,255	8.04	4	New
Brazilian Democratic Movement		371,640	7.35	3	▼1
Social Democratic Party		330,399	6.54	3	▲1
Progressistas		295,195	5.84	3	Steady
Republicanos		193,522	3.83	2	▲1
Always Forward	Brazilian Social Democracy Party	158,955	3.14	1	▼1
Always Forward	Cidadania	113,060	2.24	1	Steady
PSOL REDE	Socialism and Liberty Party	158,940	3.14	1	Steady
PSOL REDE	Sustainability Network	806	0.02	0	Steady
Avante		141,869	2.81	1	▲1
Party of National Mobilization		140,834	2.79	1	▲1
Agir		18,628	0.37	0	Steady
Brazilian Socialist Party		14,262	0.28	0	▼1
Brazilian Labour Party		13,763	0.27	0	Steady
Republican Party of the Social Order		6,596	0.13	0	▼2
Podemos		4,214	0.08	0	Steady
Popular Unity		1,662	0.03	0	New
Total		5,054,996	100.00	46	–
Valid votes		5,054,996	89.89		
Invalid votes		252,371	4.49		
Blank votes		316,083	5.62		
Total votes		5,623,450	100.00		
Registered voters/turnout		6,820,673	82.45		

==== Elected members ====
Candidate	Party	Votes	Method of election
Carmelo Neto	PL	118,603	Electoral quotient (party list)
Evandro Leitão	PDT	113,808	Electoral quotient (party list)
Marta Gonçalves	PL	112,787	Electoral quotient (party list)
Fernando Santana	PT	111,639	Electoral quotient (party list)
Sergio Aguiar	PDT	97,522	Electoral quotient (party list)
Romeu Aldigueri	PDT	90,399	Electoral quotient (party list)
Zezinho Albuquerque	PP	85,138	Electoral quotient (party list)
Doutora Silvana	PL	83,423	Electoral quotient (party list)
Gabriella Aguiar	PSD	83,128	Electoral quotient (party list)
Renato Roseno	PSOL	83,062	Electoral quotient (party list)
Cláudio Pinho	PDT	82,267	Electoral quotient (party list)
Osmar Baquit	PDT	79,769	Electoral quotient (party list)
Pr. Alcides Fernandes	PL	79,207	Electoral quotient (party list)
David Durand	REP	78,419	Electoral quotient (party list)
Guilherme Landim	PDT	76,726	Electoral quotient (party list)
João Jaime	PP	76,053	Electoral quotient (party list)
Marcos Sobreira	PDT	72,183	Electoral quotient (party list)
Jeová Mota	PDT	68,881	Electoral quotient (party list)
Agenor Neto	MDB	68,289	Electoral quotient (party list)
Antonio Henrique	PDT	67,148	Electoral quotient (party list)
Lia Gomes	PDT	67,000	Electoral quotient (party list)
Queiroz Filho	PDT	64,374	Electoral quotient (party list)
Danniel Oliveira	MDB	63,463	Electoral quotient (party list)
De Assis Diniz	PT	63,253	Electoral quotient (party list)
Moises Braz	PT	63,149	Electoral quotient (party list)
Oriel Filho	PDT	60,642	Remainder / average method
Firmo Camurça	UNIÃO	57,836	Electoral quotient (party list)
Salmito	PDT	56,624	Remainder / average method
Leonardo Pinheiro	PP	56,059	Remainder / average method
Alysson Aguiar	PCdoB	55,449	Electoral quotient (party list)
Davi de Raimundão	MDB	55,112	Electoral quotient (party list)
Dr. Oscar Rodrigues	UNIÃO	54,066	Electoral quotient (party list)
Dr. Lucílvio Girão	PSD	52,368	Electoral quotient (party list)
Luana Ribeiro	CID	51,548	Electoral quotient (party list)
Jô Farias	PT	47,816	Electoral quotient (party list)
Julinho	PT	46,082	Electoral quotient (party list)
Juliana Lucena	PT	45,474	Electoral quotient (party list)
Missias do MST	PT	44,853	Electoral quotient (party list)
Sargento Reginauro	UNIÃO	41,635	Electoral quotient (party list)
Larissa Gaspar	PT	37,887	Remainder / average method
Felipe Mota	UNIÃO	36,949	Remainder / average method
Fernando Hugo	PSD	36,880	Electoral quotient (party list)
Apostle Luiz Henrique	REP	35,149	Remainder / average method
Emilia Pessoa	PSDB	33,275	Electoral quotient (party list)
Lucinildo Frota	PMN	21,751	Electoral quotient (party list)
Stuart Castro	AVANTE	17,243	Electoral quotient (party list)
