= 2026 Ceará general election =

- Gubernatorial election
- 4 October 2026
- Opinion polls
- Registered: 5,905,522
- Turnout: 84.47% (▲2.01 pp)

| Candidate | Elmano de Freitas | Ciro Gomes |
| Party | PT | PSDB |
| Alliance | Ceará Strong on the Right Side | Unite to Change |
| Running mate | Gabriella Aguiar (PSD) | Roberto Cláudio (UNIÃO) |
| Popular vote | 2,875,573 | 2,498,891 |
| Percentage | 53.19% | 46.22% |
Governor before election
Elmano de Freitas
PT
Elected Governor
Elmano de Freitas
PT
- Senatorial election
- 4 October 2026 (one-only round)
- Opinion polls
- Registered: 5,905,522
- Turnout: 84.47% (▲2.01 pp)

| Candidate | Cid Gomes | Luizianne Lins | Capitão Wagner |
| Party | PSB | REDE | UNIÃO |
| Alliance | Ceará Strong on the Right Side | Ceará Strong on the Right Side | Unite to Change |
| Popular vote | 3,033,562 | 2,822,806 | 2,011,388 |
| Percentage | 31.22% | 29.05% | 20.70% |
Senators before election
Cid Gomes and Eduardo Girão
PSB and NOVO
Elected Senators
Cid Gomes and Luizianne Lins
PSB and REDE

The 2026 Ceara general election were held on 4 October 2026 in the Brazilian state of Ceará. Voters elected a Governor, Vice Governor, two Senators, 22 representatives for the Chamber of Deputies, and 46 Legislative Assembly members.

Incumbent governor Elmano de Freitas of the Workers' Party (PT), elected in 2022 with 54.02% of the vote, is currently running for reelection. Incumbent senators Cid Gomes of the Brazilian Socialist Party (PSB) and Eduardo Girão of the New Party (NOVO) are also eligible to run for reelection.

== Background ==
=== Electoral calendar ===
Note: This section only presents the main dates of the 2026 electoral calendar, check the TSE official website (in Portuguese) and other official sources for detailed information.

Electoral calendar
| 15 May | Start of crowdfunding of candidates |
| 20 July to 5 August | Party conventions for choosing candidates and coalitions |
| 16 August to 1 October | Period of exhibition of free electoral propaganda on radio, television and on the internet related to the first round |
| 4 October | First round of 2026 elections |
| until 19 December | Delivery of electoral diplomas for those who were elected in the 2026 elections by the Brazilian Election Justice |

=== Governor ===
Incumbent governor Elmano de Freitas of the Workers' Party (PT) was elected in 2022 in the first round with 54.02% of the vote, defeating Capitão Wagner of the Brazil Union (União) and former Fortaleza mayor Roberto Cláudio of the Democratic Labour Party (PDT).

De Freitas, a lawyer and former state deputy, was supported by a left-wing coalition championed by former governor and current Minister of Education Camilo Santana. His alliance with the Brazilian Democratic Movement (MDB) was solidified by his selection of vice governor candidate Jade Romero, who had previously served in the state executive branch.

=== Senator ===
Senators in Brazil serve an 8-year term, meaning the incumbents were elected on tickets in 2018.

Cid Gomes, a civil engineer and former Governor of Ceará (2007–2015), was elected as a member of the Democratic Labour Party (PDT). Following a high-profile split within the Gomes political family and the local PDT branch, he joined the Brazilian Socialist Party (PSB) in 2024 to realign with the ruling state coalition led by the PT.

Eduardo Girão, a businessman and former president of Fortaleza Esporte Clube, was elected as a member of the Republican Party of the Social Order (PROS) in a surprise victory over former Senate President Eunício Oliveira. He joined Podemos (PODE) in 2019 and later switched to the New Party (NOVO) in 2023. He has established himself as a vocal opposition figure in the Senate, especially on the issue of abortion.

== Gubernatorial candidates ==
=== Confirmed candidates ===
| No. | Governor | | | Vice Governor | | | Coalition Parties |
| No. | Candidate | Party Federation | Relevant offices | Candidate | Party Federation | Relevant offices | Coalition Parties |
|---|---|---|---|---|---|---|---|
| 13 | Elmano de Freitas; Elmano de Freitas da Costa | PT; FE Brasil | Municipal Secretary of Education of Fortaleza (2011–2012); State Deputy of Ceará (2015–2022); Governor of Ceará (2023–2026). | Gabriella Aguiar; Gabriela Pequeno Costa Gomes de Aguiar | PSD | State Deputy of Ceará (2023–2024); Municipal Secretary of Human Rights and Social Development of Fortaleza (2025–2026); Vice Mayor of Fortaleza (2025–2026). | Ceará Strong on the Right Side (FE Brasil (PT, PCdoB and PV), PSD, PSB, PSOL REDE Fed. (PSOL and REDE), PDT, MDB, Republicanos, PODE, Solidary Renewal Fed. (PRD and Solidariedade and MOBILIZA) |
| 14 | Delegado Huggo; Huggo Leonardo de Lima Anastácio | MISSÃO | No previous office | Felipe Moreira; Felipe Silva Moreira | MISSÃO | No previous office | No coalition |
| 16 | Zé Batista; José Batista Neto | PSTU | No previous office | Ivonete Felix; Maria Ivonete Ferreira Felix | PSTU | No previous office | No coalition |
| 29 | Ieri Braga; Ieri de Sousa Braga Júnior | PCO | No previous office | Laerte Melo; Laerte Silva de Melo | PCO | No previous office | No coalition |
| 30 | Vera Lúcia; Vera Lúcia da Silva | NOVO | No previous office | Capitão Amilton Gomes; Amilton Alves Gomes | NOVO | No previous office | No coalition |
| 35 | Danilo Soares; Danilo Soares Sousa | Democrata | No previous office | Eryck Veloso; Francisco Eryck de Souza Veloso | Democrata | No previous office | No coalition |
| 45 | Ciro Gomes; Ciro Ferreira Gomes | PSDB | State Deputy of Ceará (1985–1989); Mayor of Fortaleza (1989–1990); Governor of Ceará (1991–1994); Minister of Finance of Brazil (1994–1995); Minister of National Integration of Brazil (2003–2006); Federal Deputy for Ceará (2007–2011); State Secretary of Health of Ceará (2013–2014). | Roberto Cláudio; Roberto Cláudio Rodrigues Bezerra | UNIÃO; UPB | State Deputy of Ceará (2007–2012); Mayor of Fortaleza (2013–2020). | Unite to Change (PSDB Cidadania Fed. (PSDB and Cidadania), UPB (UNIÃO and PP), PL, Avante and DC) |
| 80 | Serley Leal; Serley de Sousa Leal | UP | No previous office | Catherine Teles; Catherine Morais Teles | UP | No previous office | No coalition |

=== Declined to be candidates ===
- Camilo Santana, agronomist, minister of education (2023–present), former governor of Ceará (2015–2022), and former state deputy of Ceará (2011–2015).
- Cid Gomes, civil engineer, incumbent senator for Ceará (2019–present), former minister of education (2015), former governor of Ceará (2007–2015), former mayor of Sobral (1997–2005), and former state deputy of Ceará (1991–1997).
- Tasso Jereissati, business administrator, former senator for Ceará (2003–2011; 2015–2023), former governor of Ceará (1987–1991; 1995–2002), and former national president of the PSDB.
- José Sarto, physician, former mayor of Fortaleza (2021–2024), former president of the Legislative Assembly of Ceará (2019–2020), former state deputy of Ceará (1995–2020), and former president of the Municipal Chamber of Fortaleza (1990–1992).

== Senatorial candidates ==
=== Confirmed candidates ===
| No. | Senator | | | Substitute members | Coalition Parties |
| No. | Candidate | Party Federation | Relevant offices | Substitute members | Coalition Parties |
|---|---|---|---|---|---|
| 162 | Reginaldo Ferreira; Reginaldo Ferreira de Araújo | PSTU | No previous office | Professor Félix (PSTU) Magela (PSTU) | No coalition |
| 180 | Luizianne Lins; Luizianne de Oliveira Lins | REDE; PSOL REDE Fed. | Councillor of Fortaleza (1997–2002); State Deputy of Ceará (2003–2004); Mayor of Fortaleza (2005–2012); Federal Deputy for Ceará (2015–2026). | Chagas Vieira (PDT) Rodrigo Oliveira (MDB) | Ceará Strong on the Right Side (FE Brasil (PT, PCdoB and PV), PSD, PSB, PSOL REDE Fed. (PSOL and REDE), PDT, MDB, Republicanos, PODE, Solidary Renewal Fed. (PRD and Solidariedade and MOBILIZA) |
| 222 | Alcides Fernandes; Alcides Fernandes da Silva | PL | State Deputy of Ceará (2023–2026). | João Barroso (PSDB) Denísio Pinheiro (PSDB) | Unite to Change (PSDB Cidadania Fed. (PSDB and Cidadania), UPB (UNIÃO and PP), PL, Avante and DC) |
| 290 | Lino Alves; Lino Alves de Almeida | PCO | No previous office | Tiago Lima (PCO) Francisco de Assis (PCO) | No coalition |
| 300 | General Theophilo; Guilherme Cals Theophilo Gaspar de Oliveira | NOVO | Secretary of Public Security of Brazil (2019–2020). | Dra. Verônica Amaral (NOVO) Capelli (NOVO) | No coalition |
| 400 | Cid Gomes; Cid Ferreira Gomes | PSB | State Deputy of Ceará (1991–1997); Mayor of Sobral (1997–2005); Governor of Ceará (2007–2015); Minister of Education of Brazil (2015); Senator for Ceará (2019–2026). | Júnior Mano (PSB) Júlio Ventura Neto (PSB) | Ceará Strong on the Right Side (FE Brasil (PT, PCdoB and PV), PSD, PSB, PSOL REDE Fed. (PSOL and REDE), PDT, MDB, Republicanos, PODE, Solidary Renewal Fed. (PRD and Solidariedade and MOBILIZA) |
| 444 | Capitão Wagner; Wagner Sousa Gomes | UNIÃO; UPB | Councillor of Fortaleza (2013–2015); State Deputy of Ceará (2015–2019); Federal Deputy for Ceará (2019–2023); Municipal Secretary of Health of Maracanaú (2023–2024). | Prisco Bezerra (UNIÃO) Lúcio Gomes (PSDB) | Unite to Change (PSDB Cidadania Fed. (PSDB and Cidadania), UPB (UNIÃO and PP), PL, Avante and DC) |
| 800 | Catarina Matos; Catarina da Graça Almeida Matos | UP | No previous office | Emanuel Menezes (UP) Carlos Feitosa (UP) | No coalition |

== Results ==
=== Governor ===
| Candidate | Running mate | Party | Votes | % |
|---|---|---|---|---|
| Elmano de Freitas (incumbent) | Gabriella Aguiar (PSD) | Workers' Party | 2,875,573 | 53.19 |
| Ciro Gomes | Roberto Cláudio (UNIÃO) | Brazilian Social Democracy Party | 2,498,891 | 46.22 |
| Huggo Anastácio | Felipe Moreira | Mission Party | 17,219 | 0.32 |
| Vera Lúcia | Amilton Gomes | New Party | 5,701 | 0.11 |
| Serley Leal | Catherine Teles | Popular Unity | 4,344 | 0.08 |
| Zé Batista | Ivonete Felix | United Socialist Workers' Party | 2,161 | 0.04 |
| Danilo Soares | Eryck Veloso | Democrata | 1,743 | 0.03 |
| Ieri Braga | Laerte Melo | Workers' Cause Party | 463 | 0.01 |
| Total | | | 5,406,095 | 100.00 |
| Valid votes | | | 5,406,095 | 91.54 |
| Invalid votes | | | 329,111 | 5.57 |
| Blank votes | | | 170,316 | 2.88 |
| Total votes | | | 5,905,522 | 100.00 |
| Registered voters/turnout | | | 6,991,044 | 84.47 |
| PT hold | | | | |

=== Senator ===
| Candidate | Party | Votes | % |
|---|---|---|---|
| Cid Gomes (incumbent) | PSB | 3,033,562 | 31.22 |
| Luizianne Lins | REDE | 2,822,806 | 29.05 |
| Wagner Sousa | UNIÃO | 2,011,388 | 20.70 |
| Alcides Fernandes | PL | 1,776,782 | 18.28 |
| Catarina Matos | UP | 39,185 | 0.40 |
| Guilherme Theophilo | NOVO | 24,218 | 0.25 |
| Reginaldo Araújo | PSTU | 7,065 | 0.07 |
| Lino Alves | PCO | 2,677 | 0.03 |
| Total | | 9,717,683 | 100.00 |
| Valid votes | | 9,717,683 | 82.28 |
| Invalid votes | | 1,247,655 | 10.56 |
| Blank votes | | 845,706 | 7.16 |
| Total votes | | 11,811,044 | 100.00 |
| Registered voters/turnout | | 6,991,044 | 84.47 |
| PSB hold | | | |
| REDE gain from NOVO | | | |

=== Chamber of Deputies ===
| Party or alliance | | Votes | % | Seats | +/– |
|---|---|---|---|---|---|
| Liberal Party | | 1,105,350 | 20.02 | 4 | ▼1 |
| Brazilian Socialist Party | | 869,239 | 15.74 | 4 | ▲4 |
| Brazil of Hope | Workers' Party | 598,429 | 10.84 | 3 | Steady |
| Brazil of Hope | Green Party | 86,860 | 1.57 | 0 | Steady |
| Brazil of Hope | Communist Party of Brazil | 29,977 | 0.54 | 0 | Steady |
| Social Democratic Party | | 567,902 | 10.29 | 3 | Steady |
| Brazilian Democratic Movement | | 407,818 | 7.39 | 2 | ▲1 |
| Progressive Union | Brazil Union | 405,479 | 7.34 | 1 | ▼3 |
| Progressive Union | Progressistas | 236,022 | 4.27 | 2 | ▲1 |
| Solidary Renewal | Democratic Renewal Party | 292,977 | 5.31 | 1 | ▲1 |
| Solidary Renewal | Solidariedade | 131,624 | 2.38 | 1 | ▲1 |
| Republicanos | | 202,689 | 3.67 | 1 | ▲1 |
| PSOL REDE | Socialism and Liberty Party | 172,748 | 3.13 | 0 | Steady |
| PSOL REDE | Sustainability Network | 18,700 | 0.34 | 0 | Steady |
| Democratic Labour Party | | 170,281 | 3.08 | 0 | ▼5 |
| PSDB Cidadania | Brazilian Social Democracy Party | 87,509 | 1.58 | 0 | Steady |
| PSDB Cidadania | Cidadania | 81,912 | 1.48 | 0 | Steady |
| Podemos | | 20,811 | 0.38 | 0 | – |
| Mission Party | | 19,041 | 0.34 | 0 | New |
| New Party | | 6,535 | 0.12 | 0 | Steady |
| Popular Unity | | 4,068 | 0.07 | 0 | Steady |
| National Mobilization | | 2,713 | 0.05 | 0 | Steady |
| Avante | | 1,717 | 0.03 | 0 | Steady |
| Christian Democracy | | 676 | 0.01 | 0 | Steady |
| Workers' Cause Party | | 565 | 0.01 | 0 | Steady |
| Total | | 5,521,642 | 100.00 | 22 | – |
| Valid votes | | 5,521,642 | 93.50 | | |
| Invalid votes | | 147,488 | 2.50 | | |
| Blank votes | | 236,392 | 4.00 | | |
| Total votes | | 5,905,522 | 100.00 | | |
| Registered voters/turnout | | 6,991,044 | 84.47 | | |

=== Legislative Assembly ===
| Party or alliance | | Votes | % | Seats | +/– |
|---|---|---|---|---|---|
| Brazilian Socialist Party | | 1,383,290 | 25.35 | 13 | ▲13 |
| Brazil of Hope | Workers' Party | 1,224,601 | 22.45 | 11 | ▲3 |
| Brazil of Hope | Green Party | 79,918 | 1.46 | 1 | ▲1 |
| Brazil of Hope | Communist Party of Brazil | 8,129 | 0.15 | 0 | ▼1 |
| Liberal Party | | 726,590 | 13.32 | 6 | ▲2 |
| PSDB Cidadania | Brazilian Social Democracy Party | 412,249 | 7.56 | 3 | ▲2 |
| PSDB Cidadania | Cidadania | 2,287 | 0.04 | 0 | ▼1 |
| Social Democratic Party | | 317,470 | 5.82 | 3 | Steady |
| Republicanos | | 272,903 | 5.00 | 2 | Steady |
| PSOL REDE | Socialism and Liberty Party | 225,675 | 4.14 | 2 | ▲1 |
| PSOL REDE | Sustainability Network | 51,357 | 0.94 | 0 | Steady |
| Brazilian Democratic Movement | | 207,316 | 3.80 | 1 | ▼2 |
| Progressive Union | Brazil Union | 197,824 | 3.63 | 2 | ▼2 |
| Progressive Union | Progressistas | 129,389 | 2.37 | 1 | ▼2 |
| National Mobilization | | 69,643 | 1.28 | 0 | ▼1 |
| Solidary Renewal | Solidariedade | 62,627 | 1.15 | 1 | ▲1 |
| Solidary Renewal | Democratic Renewal Party | 51,716 | 0.95 | 0 | Steady |
| Democratic Labour Party | | 20,806 | 0.38 | 0 | ▼13 |
| New Party | | 6,726 | 0.12 | 0 | Steady |
| Podemos | | 2,291 | 0.04 | 0 | Steady |
| Popular Unity | | 1,972 | 0.04 | 0 | Steady |
| United Socialist Workers' Party | | 1,001 | 0.02 | 0 | Steady |
| Total | | 5,455,780 | 100.00 | 46 | – |
| Valid votes | | 5,455,780 | 92.38 | | |
| Invalid votes | | 169,858 | 2.88 | | |
| Blank votes | | 279,884 | 4.74 | | |
| Total votes | | 5,905,522 | 100.00 | | |
| Registered voters/turnout | | 6,991,044 | 84.47 | | |
