= Capitão Wagner =

Brazilian politician

Wagner Sousa
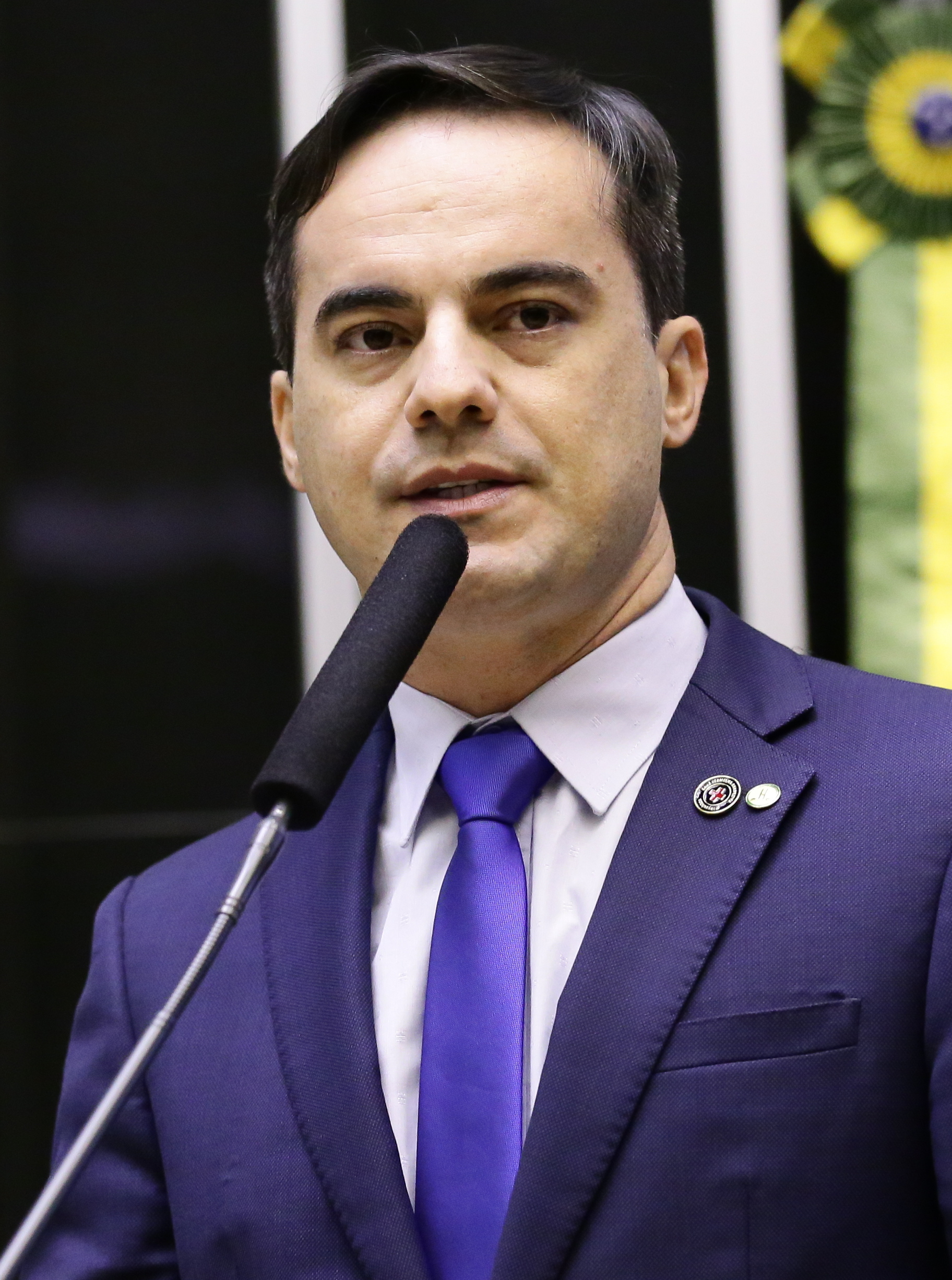

Secretary of Health of Maracanaú
- In office 2 February 2023 – 29 February 2024
- Mayor: Roberto Pessoa
- Succeeded by: Vanderlange de Sousa Gomes

Member of the Chamber of Deputies
- In office 1 February 2019 – 1 February 2023
- Constituency: Ceará

Member of the Legislative Assembly of Ceará
- In office 1 January 2015 – 31 December 2018
- Constituency: At-large

Member of the Municipal Chamber of Fortaleza
- In office 1 January 2013 – 31 December 2014
- Constituency: At-large

Personal details
- Born: Wagner Sousa Gomes; 21 January 1979 (age 47) São Paulo, Brazil
- Party: UNIÃO (2022–present)
- Other political affiliations: PR (2009–2018); PROS (2018–22)
- Spouse: Dayany Bittencourt
- Profession: Captain of the Military Police Reserve of Ceará

Wagner Sousa Gomes, also known as Capitão Wagner (born January 21, 1979) is a captain of the Military Police Reserve of the State of Ceará and a Brazilian politician affiliated to Brazil Union (UNIÃO). He was a federal deputy in office from 2019 to 2023.

Leader of Ceará's public security workers, he was notable for leading the 2011 Ceará Military Police riot, which was responsible for the insecurity among the population and the chaos brought to the city of Fortaleza with a forced quarantine. At the time, he exchanged insults with the then governor Cid Gomes and his brother Ciro Gomes.

He was the most voted councillor of Fortaleza in 2012, the most voted state deputy in Ceará in 2014 and the most voted federal deputy in Ceará in 2018. He was also a candidate for mayor in the 2016 Fortaleza mayoral election and 2020 Fortaleza mayoral election and in both disputes, he advanced to a second round. But in the end, Mayor Roberto Cláudio (in 2016) and José Sarto (in 2020), both members of the Democratic Labour Party (PDT) were elected.

He was the Secretary of Health of Maracanaú under Roberto Pessoa's administration from February 2023 to February 2024.

== Career ==
Wagner Sousa Gomes was born in São Paulo, in the district of Santo Amaro, and as a child he moved to Fortaleza. In 2009, he was approved in a Federal Highway Police (PRF) test. After he took the position of Bachelor in Public Security, Wagner was the leader of the strike movement of the Military Police and Firefighters in Ceará, from the end of 2011 to 2012.

In 2009, he joined the Party of the Republic (PR). He ran in 2010 for State Deputy of Ceará, having obtained 28,818 votes, being Fernanda Pessoa's alternate. He took office in September 2011, when he went to the proportional paid reserve of the Military Police of Ceará, due to the deputy's retirement. He participated in the electoral race for councillor in Fortaleza in 2012, being elected with the highest number of votes in the city. In 2014, he ran for state deputy and was again elected with the highest number of votes. In an interview with Rádio Clube, on March 16, 2016, he announced his candidacy for mayor of Fortaleza, which had the support of the Brazilian Social Democracy Party (PSDB), of the Brazilian Democratic Movement Party (PMDB) and Solidariedade (SD).

In August 2016, at an event of his campaign in the João XXIII neighborhood of Fortaleza, he assured that his first proposal was to arm and train the Municipal Guard of Fortaleza. However, he received criticism from his opponent, Luizianne Lins (PT), stating that it would be “a thing for desperate people”.

In the 2016 Fortaleza mayoral election, Capitão Wagner obtained 400,802 votes (31.15%), which lead the dispute for the mayor of Fortaleza to a second round with Roberto Cláudio (PDT). He was defeated in the second round, obtaining 588,451 votes (46.43%) against Roberto Cláudio's 678,847 votes (53.57%).

In 2018, Capitão Wagner joined the Republican Party of the Social Order (PROS) and decided to run in the state elections in Ceará as a candidate for the Chamber of Deputies. He ended up being the most voted candidate for federal deputy in the state, with over 300,000 votes.

Accused of leading the 2020 police riot in Ceará, Wagner presented a bill in the Chamber of Deputies to give amnesty to security agents involved in the strike. The project was rejected by the president of the Chamber of the Deputies at the time, Rodrigo Maia.

In the 2020 Fortaleza mayoral election, Capitão Wagner was a candidate for mayor for a second time. In the second round, he got 624,892 votes (48.31%), being defeated by José Sarto (PDT), who got 668,652 votes (51.69%).

In the 2022 Ceará gubernatorial election, Capitão Wagner was a candidate for governor for the first time. He got 1,649,213 votes (31.72%) and was defeated in the first round by Elmano de Freitas (PT), elected with almost 3 million votes.

On 2 February 2023, he was appointed by the mayor of Maracanaú, Roberto Pessoa (UNIÃO), as the new Secretary of Health of the municipality.

== Electoral history ==
Year	Election	Party	Office	Coalition	Partners	Votes	Percent	Result	Ref.
2010	State Elections of Ceará	PR	State Deputy	To Make Ceará Shine (PR, PPS)	None	28,818	0.71%	Alternate	
2012	Municipal Elections of Fortaleza	PR	Councillor	To Take Care of People (PT, PR, PTN, PSC, PV)	None	43,655	3.49%	Elected	
2014	State Elections of Ceará	PR	State Deputy	Ceará of All (PMDB, PSC, PR, PRP, PSDB)	None	194,239	4.36%	Elected	
2016	Fortaleza Mayoral Election	PR	Mayor	Together We are More (PR, PMDB, PSDB, Solidarity)	Gaudêncio Lucena (PMDB)	588,451	46.43%	Lost; 2nd Round	
2018	State Elections of Ceará	PROS	Federal Deputy	None		303,593	6.61%	Elected	
2020	Fortaleza Mayoral Election	PROS	Mayor	A Fortaleza of All (PROS, PODE, Republicans, PSC, DC, PMN, PMB, PTC, Avante)	Kamila Cardoso (PODE)	624,892	48.31%	Lost; 2nd Round	
2022	Ceará Gubernatorial Election	UNIÃO	Governor	Union for Ceará (UNIÃO, Avante, PTB, Republicans, PL, PODE, PROS)	Raimundo Matos (PL)	1,649,213	31.72%	Lost	
2024	Fortaleza Mayoral Election	UNIÃO	Mayor	None	Edilene Santos (UNIÃO)	159,426	11.40%	Lost; 1st Round	
2026	State Elections of Ceará	UNIÃO	Senator	Unite to Change (Always Forward (PSDB and Cidadania), UPB (UNIÃO and PP), PL, Avante, DC)	Lúcio Gomes (PSDB)	2,011,388	20.70%	Lost	
2026	State Elections of Ceará	UNIÃO	Senator	Unite to Change (Always Forward (PSDB and Cidadania), UPB (UNIÃO and PP), PL, Avante, DC)	Prisco Bezerra (UNIÃO)	2,011,388	20.70%	Lost	
