= Luizianne Lins =

Brazilian journalist and politician (born 1968)

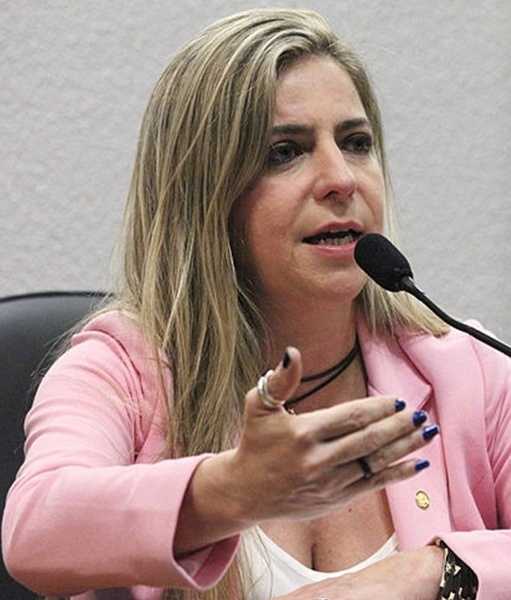

Senator-elect for Ceará
- Assuming office 1 February 2027

Member of the Chamber of Deputies
- Incumbent
- Assumed office 1 February 2015
- Constituency: Ceará

Mayor of Fortaleza
- In office 1 January 2005 – 1 January 2013
- Vice Mayor: Carlos Veneranda (2005–2009); Tin Gomes (2009–2013)
- Preceded by: Juraci Magalhães
- Succeeded by: Roberto Cláudio

Member of the Legislative Assembly of Ceará
- In office 1 February 2003 – 1 January 2005
- Constituency: At-large

Member of the Municipal Chamber of Fortaleza
- In office 1 January 1997 – 1 February 2003
- Constituency: At-large

Personal details
- Born: Luizianne de Oliveira Lins; 18 November 1968 (age 57) Fortaleza, Ceará, Brazil
- Party: REDE (since 2026)
- Other political affiliations: PT (1989–2026)
- Education: Pontifical Catholic University of São Paulo (PhD)
- Profession: Journalist

Luizianne de Oliveira Lins (born 18 November 1968) is a Brazilian journalist, politician, and former mayor of Fortaleza. She was Fortaleza's second female mayor.

Luizianne's electoral journey began in the Workers' Party since 1989. She declares herself as a socialist and a feminist. She is a licensed professor at the institution and left the PT in 2026, after 37 years of membership.

== Biography ==
Luizianne holds a journalism degree from the Federal University of Ceará. She was a prominent activist in the student movement, serving as the president of the university student union and as a director of National Union of Students. After graduating, she became a professor at the same university and is currently on authorized leave to serve in Congress.

In 1996, she was elected to Fortaleza's city council and was reelected in 2000. During her time on the Municipal Chamber, she chaired the Education, Culture, and Sports Commission and also presided over the Women, Youth, and Children Commission, which was established following a bill proposed by Lins.

In 2002, she was elected state representative with 60,821 votes, the fourth highest vote count in Ceará and the highest among women running for the position. In the Legislative Assembly, she chaired the Human Rights and Citizenship Commission and participated in the Agriculture and Water Resources Commission. She was an alternate member of the Budget, Finance and Taxation Commission, the Education, Culture and Sports Commission, the Science and Technology Commission, and the Social Defense Commission. Her parliamentary work encompassed education, youth and culture, as well as popular movements, sexuality, women's rights, the environment and human rights. She resigned in late 2003 after being elected as the mayor of Fortaleza.

In 2004, she ran for the position of Fortaleza's mayor. During the first round of the elections, the national leadership of her party supported the PCdoB candidate, Inácio Arruda, due to PT's national strategy and alliances. Nevertheless, she advanced to the second round of elections. In the second round, she received full support from the Workers' Party and several other historically leftist parties, including PSB. She then defeated Moroni Torgan from the Liberal Front Party and was elected as the mayor of Fortaleza.

Luizianne was re-elected as mayor in 2008, completing her second term as mayor of Fortaleza in December 2012. Brazilian law does not allow politicians in executive branch to serve more than two consecutive terms.

Luizianne Lins was elected to the Chamber of Deputies in 2014 with 130,717 votes (2.99% of the total votes). In 2014, Lins was convicted of abuse of political power for trying to help and coerce for the PT candidate for Mayor of Fortaleza, Elmano de Freitas, and his vice-president. She was declared ineligible to run for eight years; however, in an appeal in 2015, she was acquitted and declared innocent of abuse, and her sanction of ineligibility imposed was removed. She was re-elected in 2018 and 2022 with 173,777 and 182,232 votes, respectively.

He presented projects on including the care economy in national accounts, reserving places for people with disabilities in federal educational institutions, and ensuring the continuity of water, energy, gas, and sewage services during health emergencies. He also proposed classifying murder motivated by discrimination against LGBT people as aggravated homicide and a heinous crime.

Lins unsuccessfully attempted to regain the position of Mayor of Fortaleza in 2016 and 2020, finishing in third place in both elections. She received her PhD in Communication and Semiotics from the Pontifical Catholic University of São Paulo in 2023.

In October 2025, she was detained and deported by Israel after participating in the Global Sumud Flotilla to the Gaza Strip.

In December 2025, she was elected by acclamation to chair the Combat Violence Against Women Joint Commission, made up of deputies and senators, for the 2025–2026 term.

On April 2, 2026, he announced his departure from the Workers' Party after 37 years of membership and joined the Sustainability Network. In explaining his decision, he stated that the PT was losing its identity with the arrival of members who, in his opinion, did not share the party's principles.

In the elections of October 4, 2026, she was elected senator for Ceará by the REDE party, with 2,822,806 votes and 29.05% of the valid votes. She obtained one of the two seats in dispute, alongside Cid Gomes, of the PSB party, for the term from February 1, 2027 to January 31, 2035.

== Personal life ==
Lins resides in the south zone of Rio de Janeiro in a 90-square-meter apartment with her son.

== Electoral history ==
Year	Election	Party	Office	Coalition	Partners	Votes	Percent	Result	Ref.
1996	Municipal Elections of Fortaleza	PT	Councillor	Fortaleza in the Lead (PCdoB, PT, PSTU, PCB)	None	5,336	0.67%	Elected	
2000	Municipal Elections of Fortaleza	PT	Councillor	Fortaleza of All (PCdoB, PT, PCB, PDT, PSB)	None	9,725	1.03%	Elected	
2002	State Elections of Ceará	PT	State Deputy	Different Ceará (PT, PCdoB, PL, PMN, PCB)	None	60,821	1.69%	Elected	
2004	Fortaleza Mayoral Election	PT	Mayor	Beloved Fortaleza (PT, PSB)	Carlos Veneranda (PSB)	620,174	56.21%	Elected; 2nd Round	
2008	Fortaleza Mayoral Election	PT	Mayor	Fortaleza Getting Better Every Day (PT, PHS, PSB, PCdoB, PMDB, PV, PMN, PSL, PTN, PRB, PTdoB, PSDC)	Tin Gomes (PHS)	593,778	50.16%	Elected	
2014	State Elections of Ceará	PT	Federal Deputy	To Ceará Keep Changing (PT, PROS, PRB, PP, PDT, PTB, PSL, PRTB, PHS, PMN, PTC, PV, PEN, PPL, PSD, PCdoB, PTdoB, SD)	None	130,717	2.99%	Elected	
2016	Fortaleza Mayoral Election	PT	Mayor	None	Elmano de Freitas (PT)	193,687	15.06%	Lost; 1st Round	
2018	State Elections of Ceará	PT	Federal Deputy	For a Stronger Ceará (PT, PDT, PP, PR, PTB, DEM, PCdoB, PPS, PRP, PV, PMN, PPL, PATRI, PRTB, PMB, PSB)	None	173,777	3.78%	Elected	
2020	Fortaleza Mayoral Election	PT	Mayor	None	Vladyson Viana (PT)	227,470	17.76%	Lost; 1st Round	
2022	State Elections of Ceará	PT	Federal Deputy	Ceará Gets Stronger (Brazil of Hope (PT, PCdoB and PV), PRTB, PP, MDB, PSOL–REDE Fed. (PSOL and REDE), Solidarity)	None	182,232	3.56%	Elected	
2026	State Elections of Ceará	REDE	Senator	Ceará Strong on the Right Side (Brazil of Hope (PT, PCdoB and PV), PSD, PSB, PSOL–REDE Fed. (PSOL and REDE), PDT, MDB, Republicans, Solidary Renewal (PRD and Solidarity), PODE, MOBILIZA)	Chagas Vieira (PDT)	2,822,806	29.05%	Elected	
2026	State Elections of Ceará	REDE	Senator	Ceará Strong on the Right Side (Brazil of Hope (PT, PCdoB and PV), PSD, PSB, PSOL–REDE Fed. (PSOL and REDE), PDT, MDB, Republicans, Solidary Renewal (PRD and Solidarity), PODE, MOBILIZA)	Rodrigo Oliveira (MDB)	2,822,806	29.05%	Elected	

== See also ==
- List of feminists
- Women's suffrage
- Feminism
- List of mayors of Fortaleza
