= Oriel Filho =

Brazilian politician

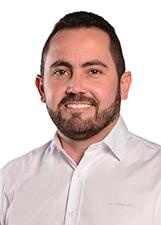
- Oriel Filho em 2022

Member of the Legislative Assembly of Ceará
- In office 1 February 2023 – Incumbent (on leave since 1 March 2023)
- Succeeded by: Antônio Granja (1st substitute, assumed seat)
- Constituency: At-large

Secretary of State for Fisheries and Aquaculture of Ceará
- In office 1 March 2023 – Incumbent
- Governor: Elmano de Freitas

Personal details
- Born: Oriel Guimarães Nunes Filho; May 30, 1987 (age 38) Icó, Ceará, Brazil
- Party: PT (2025–present)
- Other political affiliations: PDT (2018–2025); DEM (2012–2018)
- Occupation: Physiotherapist
- Profession: Physiotherapist
- Oriel Filho is currently on leave from his assembly seat to serve as Secretary of State for Fisheries and Aquaculture.

Oriel Guimarães Nunes Filho (May 30, 1987), better known as Oriel Filho, is a Brazilian physical therapist and politician affiliated with the Workers' Party (PT). He is currently the State Secretary of Fisheries and Agriculture of Ceará, as well as a licensed State deputy.

== Biography ==
=== Early years and education ===
Oriel was born in Icó, a city in the interior of the state of Ceará, in 1987. He is the nephew of Neto Nunes, who served two terms as mayor of the city and was a state representative for Ceará.

He moved to Juazeiro do Norte to study, where he graduated in physical therapy from Faculdade Leão Sampaio in 2010.

=== Politics ===
He began his political activism in Juazeiro, joining the Democrats (DEM) party in 2012. According to data from the Superior Electoral Court (TSE), the candidate for city councilor did not receive any votes.

In 2018, he joined the Democratic Labour Party (PDT), where he ran for state representative. He received over 30,000 votes, but was not elected. In the following election, in 2022, he was elected to office after receiving more than 60,000 votes. The following year, he resigned from his position to become secretary of fisheries and agriculture after being appointed by the governor of Ceará, Elmano de Freitas (PT).

With Elmano's approach, he joined the Workers' Party (PT) in February 2025, in a ceremony attended by regional party officials, including José Guimarães, federal deputy for Ceará.

==== Electoral performance ====
Year	Election	Position	Party	Coalition	Votes			Result	Ref.
Year	Election	Position	Party	Coalition	Total	%	Position	Result	Ref.
2012	Municipality of Juazeiro do Norte	Councilman	DEM	Junto e Misturado (PMDB, DEM, PSL)	0	0	-	Not elected	
2018	Ceará gubernatorial election	State deputy	PDT	PP, PDT, PR, DEM, PRP	39.474	0,86%	49º	Not elected	
2022	Ceará gubernatorial election	State deputy	PDT	Isolated party	60.642	1,19%	26º	Elected	
