= Jade Romero =

Brazilian public works manager and politician

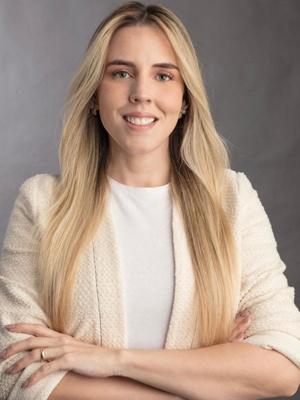

Vice-governor of Ceará
- Incumbent
- Assumed office 1 January 2023
- Governor: Elmano de Freitas
- Preceded by: Izolda Cela

Secretary of Social Protection of Ceará
- Incumbent
- Assumed office 27 December 2024
- Preceded by: Onélia Santana

Secretary of Women of Ceará
- In office 1 March 2023 – 27 December 2024
- Preceded by: Onélia Santana (as Secretary of Social Protection)
- Succeeded by: Liliane Araújo (interim)

Personal details
- Born: Jade Afonso Romero; 12 July 1985 (age 41) Fortaleza, Ceará, Brazil
- Party: PT (2002–2010); MDB (2010–2026); PT (2026–present)
- Education: University of Fortaleza; Universidade Gama Filho; University of Lisbon

Jade Afonso Romero (born 12 July 1985) is a Brazilian public works manager, professor, and politician affiliated with the Brazil Union (UNIÃO). She is the current vice-governor and secretary of Social Protection of the state of Ceará.

== Early life ==
Born on 12 July 1985 in Fortaleza, Romero was a student of the now-defunct Colégio Marista Cearense and participated in student movements. She graduated with a degree in Public Management from the University of Fortaleza, specialized in Public Policy from Universidade Gama Filho, and earned a master's degree in Public Administration from the University of Lisbon. She was a university professor, academic researcher, and project manager in the third sector.

== Political career ==
Having shown interest in politics since she was young, Romero became a member of the Workers' Party (PT) at 16 years. In 2010, she switched her affiliation with the Brazilian Democratic Movement (MDB), where she began to commit to activism nationally. Within the party, she led the Youth Wing branch in Ceará, and she later became an executive and councilwoman with the national wing of MDB Youth, as well as presiding over MDB Mulher.

From January 2013 to July 2014, Romero was the municipal secretary of People's Participation of Fortaleza during the mayorship of then-mayor Roberto Cláudio; from 2014 to 2018, she was the parliamentary advisor to then senator Eunício Oliveira; in 2017, she was also the Brazilian representative to the youth summit of the annual BRICS meeting in Russia that year; between January 2019 and April 2020, she was the executive Secretary of Sport of Ceará during the governorship of Camilo Santana; she later became the special advisor to Ceará's Chief of staff from March 2021 to February 2022.

In 2022, Romero was indicated by the MDB to be the candidate for vice-governor of the ticket led by Elmano de Freitas of the PT. The ticket received 2,808,300 votes, or 54.02% of the vote, and won in the first round. They took office in January 2023, and was designated to assume, in March of that year, the Secretary of Women in the state, created as a post disconnected from the secretariat that previously administered such matters, the Secretary of Social Protection, Justice, Citizenship, Women, and Human Rights. In December 2024, amidst a shuffle in the state cabinet, she became the secretary of Social Protection.
