= Izolda Cela =

Brazilian professor and psychologist, 60th governor of Ceará

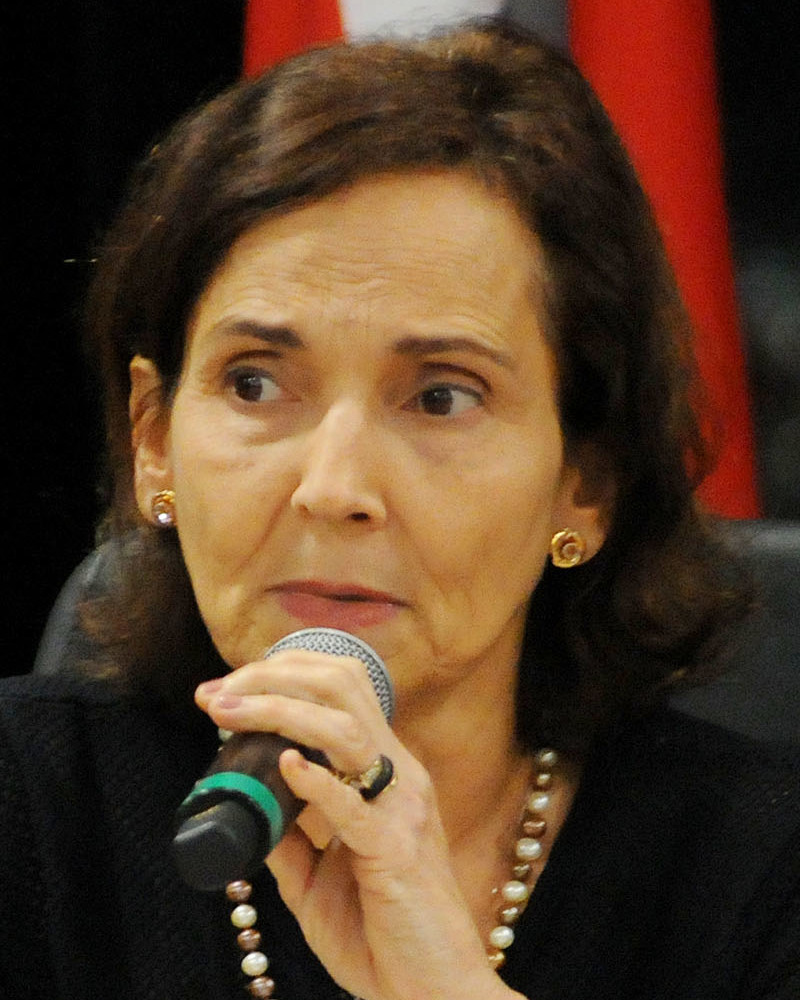

Executive Secretary of the Ministry of Education of Brazil
- In office 19 January 2023 – 30 May 2024
- Minister: Camilo Santana
- Preceded by: José de Castro Barreto Junior

Governor of Ceará
- In office 2 April 2022 – 31 December 2022
- Vice Governor: Vacant
- Preceded by: Camilo Santana
- Succeeded by: Elmano de Freitas

Vice Governor of Ceará
- In office 1 January 2015 – 2 April 2022
- Governor: Camilo Santana
- Preceded by: Domingos Gomes de Aguiar Filho
- Succeeded by: Jade Romero

First Lady of Sobral
- In role 1 January 2011 – 31 December 2016
- Mayor: Veveu Arruda
- Preceded by: Maria Esther Frota Cristino
- Succeeded by: Viviam Paula Rodrigues Trajano

Secretary of Education of Ceará
- In office 2 January 2007 – 4 April 2014
- Governor: Cid Gomes
- Preceded by: Luís Eduardo de Menezes Lima
- Succeeded by: Maurício Holanda Maia

Second Lady of Sobral
- In role 1 January 2005 – 1 January 2011
- Vice Mayor: Veveu Arruda

Secretary of Education of Sobral
- In office 2005–2006
- Mayor: Leônidas Cristino

Personal details
- Born: Maria Izolda Cela de Arruda Coelho; 9 May 1960 (age 66) Sobral, Ceará, Brazil
- Party: PSB (2024–present)
- Other political affiliations: Independent (2022–2024); PDT (2016–2022); PROS (2013–2016); PT (2001–2013)
- Domestic partner: Veveu Arruda
- Children: 4, including Luisa
- Education: Federal University of Ceará
- Profession: professor and psychologist
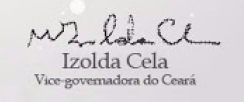
- Signature

Maria Izolda Cela de Arruda Coelho (born Sobral, Ceará, 9 May 1960) is a Brazilian professor, psychologist, politician and the first female governor in the history of the Brazilian state of Ceará. A member of the Brazilian Socialist Party, she was the Vice Governor (from 2015 to 2022) and Governor of Ceará (from April to December 2022), being succeeded by Elmano de Freitas. She took office after the resignation of Camilo Santana. After she left the government of Ceará, she took office as the Executive Secretary of the Ministry of Education from January 2023 to May 2024.

== Biography ==
Born in the municipality of Sobral, Ceará, Izolda Cela is the daughter of Maria Helena Cela (1928–2001), an elementary school teacher born in Camocim, Ceará, and Afonso Walter Magalhães Pinto (1916–1969), a cardiologist from Santa Quitéria.

Graduated in psychology at the Federal University of Ceará (UFC), she became academically specialized in Early Childhood Education at the State University of Ceará and also in Public Management at the Vale do Acaraú State University, where she became a pedagogy teacher years later. She became a Master in Management and Evaluation of Public Education from the Federal University of Juiz de Fora, in Minas Gerais. Before entering public life, Izolda worked as a school psychologist at Colégio Sobralense (1986 and 1988), was part of the pedagogical board of the Arco-Iris School (1989), and gained clinical experience in child care when working at the Integrated Development Clinic (1991–1995), all in the municipality of Sobral.

In addition, Izolda Cela is the great-niece of the painter Raimundo Cela, and she's married for over 30 years to the lawyer and former mayor of Sobral, José Clodoveu de Arruda Coelho Neto (PT), with whom she had four children: Hilda, Luisa, Clara and Pedro.

== Political life ==
In 2001, Izolda Cela began her political career by assuming the position of Undersecretary for Education Development in the municipal administration of Sobral, Ceará, a position she remained in until 2004. Between 2005 and 2006, she served as the Municipal Secretary of Education and, between 2007 and 2014, as Secretary of Education of the State of Ceará.

In 2014 Ceará state election, she ran for the first time as the running mate of Camilo Santana (PT) for the government of Ceará. She was affiliated to the Republican Party of the Social Order (PROS). Reaching the sum of 2,039,233 votes in the 1st round, 47.81% of the valid votes, and 2,417,668 votes in the 2nd round, 53.35% of the valid votes, the ticket won the electoral dispute and Izolda was elected the first female Vice Governor of the state of Ceará. On August 14, 2015, Izolda was considered the first woman to assume the government of Ceará, due to Governor Camilo's official trip for a week.

In the 2018 Ceará state election, Izolda ran again for the position of Vice Governor of the State of Ceará on the ticket of incumbent governor Camilo Santana. Now affiliated to the Democratic Labour Party (PDT), the ticket garnered 3,457,556 votes (equivalent to 79.96% of valid votes), winning the dispute in the 1st round of the elections.

On April 2, 2022, Santana resigned as governor to run for the Federal Senate, which made Izolda Cela the new governor and the first woman in history to command the state of Ceará from April to December 2022. She was appointed by president Lula as Executive Secretary of the Ministry of Education of Brazil on 19 January 2023 and she stayed in office until 30 May 2024, when she announced her resignation in order to run in the 2024 Brazilian municipal elections as a potential candidate for mayor, either in Fortaleza or in her hometown, Sobral.

== Electoral results ==
Year	Election	Running as	Coalition	Party	Ticket	Votos	%	Results
2014	Ceará gubernatorial election	Vice Governor	Keep Ceará changing (PROS, PT, PRB, PP, PDT, PTB, PSL, PRTB, PHS, PMN, PTC, PV, PEN, PPL, PSD, PCdoB, PTdoB, SD)	PROS	Camilo Santana (PT)	2.039.233 (1º - first round) 2.417.668 (1º - second round)	47,81 (1º - first round) 53,35 (1º - second round)	Elected
2018	Ceará gubernatorial election	Vice Governor	For a Stronger Ceará (PT, PDT, PP, PSB, PR, PTB, DEM, PCdoB, PPS, PRP, PV, PMN, PPL, PATRI, PRTB, PMB)	PDT	Camilo Santana (PT)	3.457.556 (1º - first round)	79,96% (1º - first round)	Elected
