= Luisa Cela =

Brazilian politician (born 1987)

Member-elect of the Chamber of Deputies
- Assuming office 1 February 2027
- Constituency: Ceará

Personal details
- Born: Luisa Cela de Arruda Coelho; 9 March 1987 (age 39) Sobral, Ceará, Brazil
- Party: PT
- Parent: Izolda Cela (mother)
- Education: Federal University of Ceará
- Profession: Psychologist

Luisa Cela de Arruda Coelho (born 9 March 1987) is a Brazilian politician who was elected member of the Chamber of Deputies in 2026. She is the daughter of Izolda Cela and Veveu Arruda.
