= Augusta Brito =

Brazilian politician (born 1976)

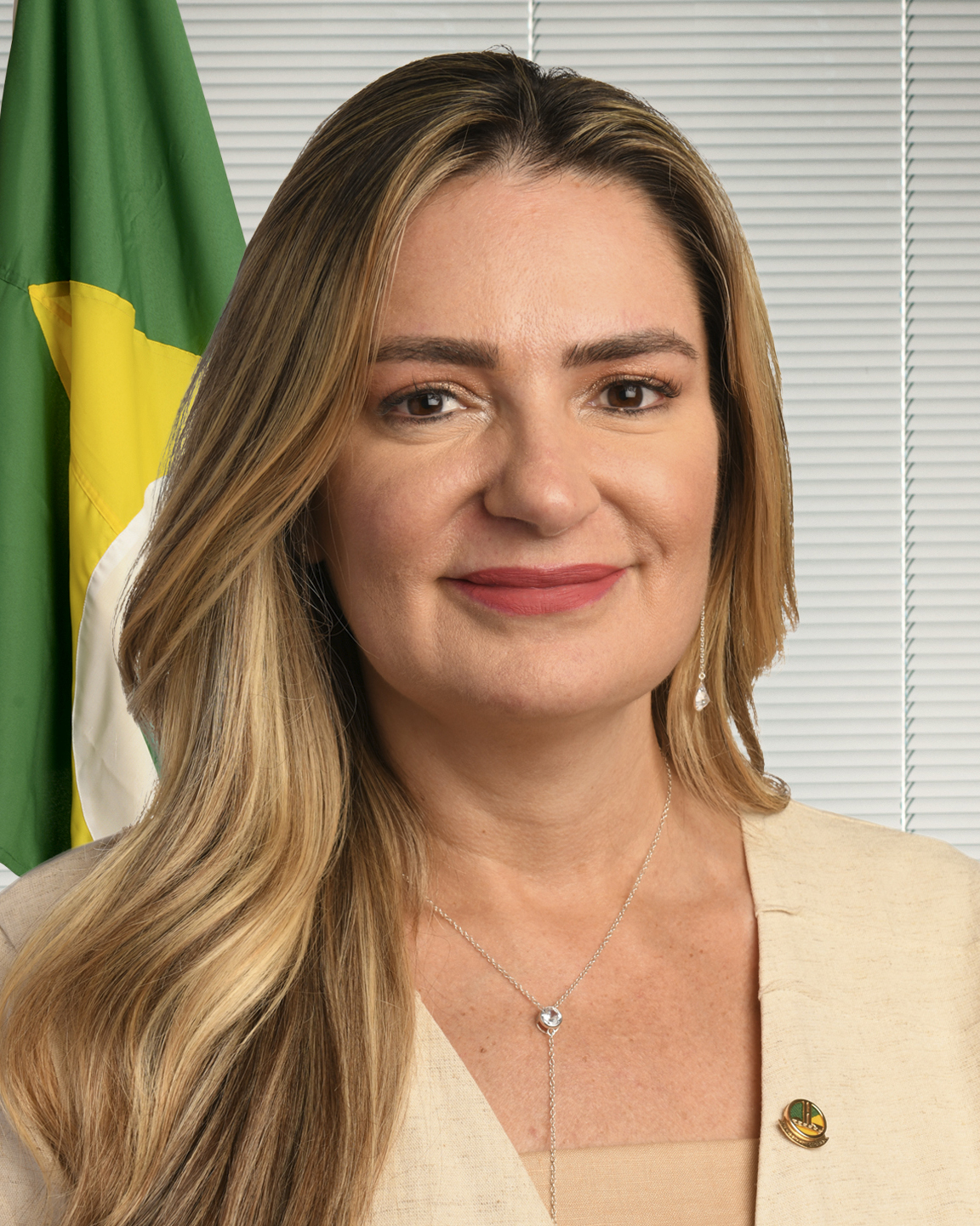
- Brito in 2023

Member of the Federal Senate
- Incumbent
- Assumed office 2 February 2023
- Constituency: Ceará

Personal details
- Born: 27 May 1976 (age 50)
- Party: Workers' Party (since 2022)

Augusta Brito de Paula (born 27 May 1976) is a Brazilian politician serving as a member of the Federal Senate since 2023. From 2005 to 2012, she served as mayor of Graça.
