= 2018 Ceará general election =

2018 Ceará gubernatorial election
- 7 October 2018 (first round)
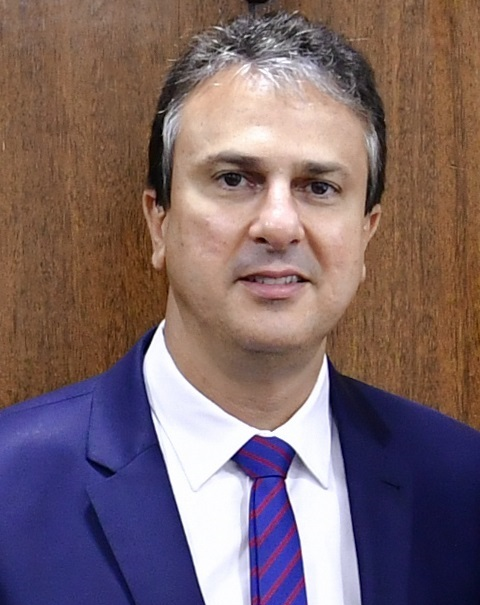

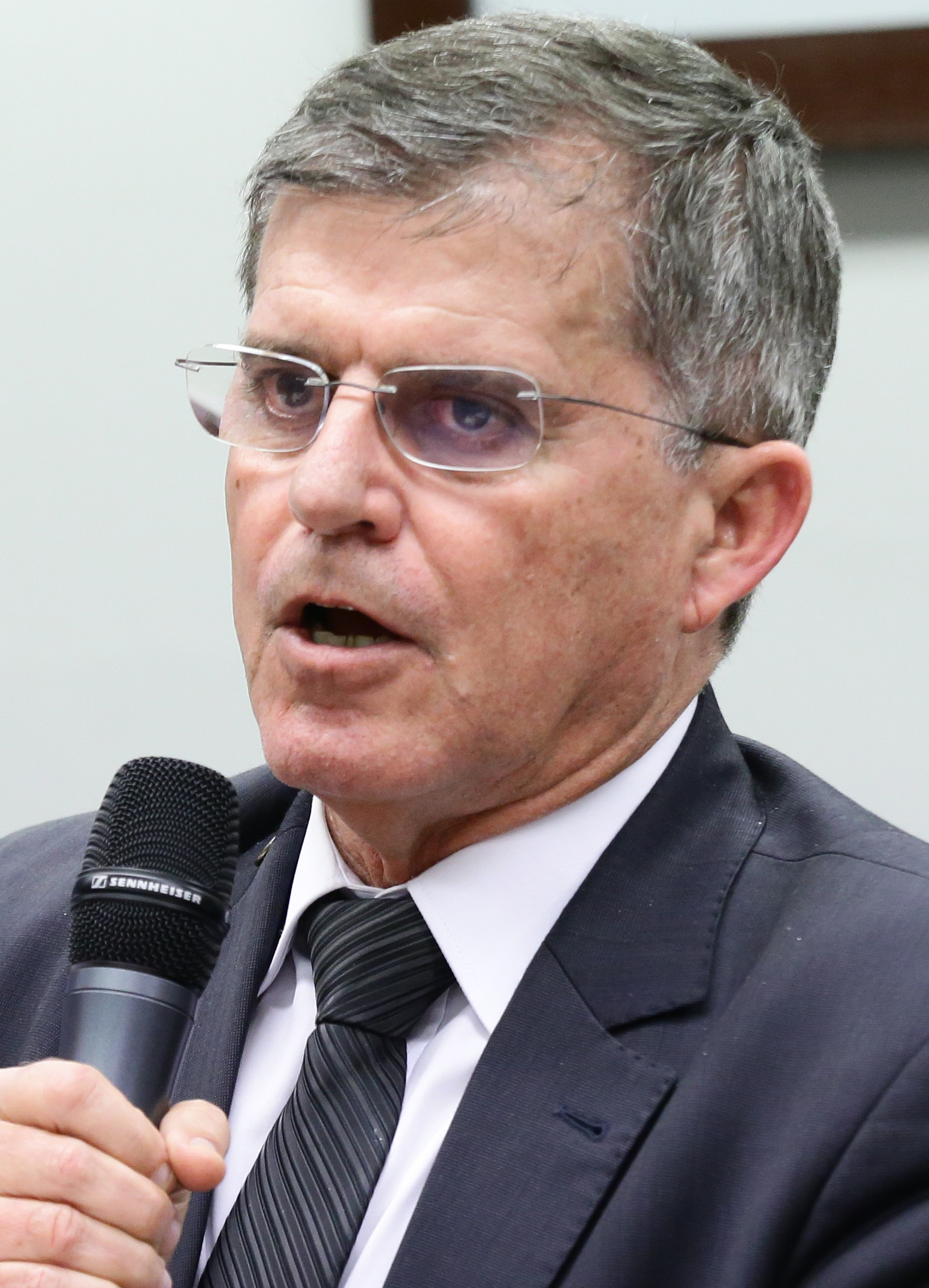
Candidate	Camilo Santana	General Theophilo
Party	PT	PSDB
Running mate	Izolda Cela (PDT)	Emília Pessoa (PSDB)
Popular vote	3,457,556	488,438
Percentage	79.96%	11.30%
- Candidate with the most votes per municipality in the 1st round (184): Camilo Santana (184)
Governor before election
Camilo Santana
Workers' Party
Elected Governor
Camilo Santana
Workers' Party

The 2018 Ceará state election was held on October 7, 2018 as part of the general elections in Brazil. Those from Ceará eligible to vote elected their representatives in the following proportion: 22 federal deputies, 2 senators, and 46 state deputies.

The candidates for the state government were Camilo Santana (PT), General Theophilo (PSDB), Hélio Góis (PSL), Aílton Lopes (PSOL), and Francisco Gonzaga (PSTU). Camilo was reelected in the first round, with 79.96% of the votes, obtaining the highest percentage in history in a gubernatorial election in Ceará, overcoming the 1982 election results where Gonzaga Mota was elected with 70% of the votes in the first direct election since redemocratization.

In the previous election, Camilo Santana from the Workers' Party (PT) defeated Eunício Oliveira from the Brazilian Democratic Movement (MDB) in the second round. Camilo Santana received 53.35% of the votes, while Eunício received 46.65% of the votes.

== Electoral system ==
=== Gubernatorial election ===
In general, the rules for the presidential elections are also applied to the state. The elections have two rounds, if none of the candidates reaches an absolute majority of the valid votes, a second round between the two most voted candidates happens. All candidates with executive positions should resign by April 7, in order to run.

=== Senatorial election ===
According to the planned rotation for the 2018 Senate elections, two seats for each state will be up for grabs for the 8-year term. The two candidates with the most votes are elected and there is no second round for legislative elections. The ticket of every candidate for the Federal Senate of Brazil must nominate at least two alternate candidates for senator, at least one of whom will assume the vacancy if the Incumbent Senator is licensed to take office as a Minister of State or State Secretary or in case of resignation to take office as a President, Governor, Mayor or their respective vices. The alternate senator also assumes the seat in cases of resignation of the Incumbent senator for personal reasons, death or revocation of the term.

=== Chamber of Deputies and Legislative Assembly elections ===
The Chamber of Deputies and the Ceará State Legislative elections are held using open list proportional representation, with seats allocated using the Hare quota.

== Candidates ==
=== Governor ===
Candidate for Governor		Candidate for Vice Governor	Electoral Number	Coalition/Party
Camilo Santana; Workers' Party (PT)		Izolda Cela; Democratic Labour Party (PDT)	13	For a Stronger Ceará (PT, PDT, PP, PSB, PR, PTB, DEM, PCdoB, PPS, PRP, PV, PMN, PPL, PATRI, PRTB, PMB)
Ailton Lopes; Socialism and Liberty Party (PSOL)		Carina Costa; Socialism and Liberty Party (PSOL)	50	Left Socialist Front (PSOL, PCB)
Francisco Gonzaga; United Socialist Workers' Party (PSTU)		Reginaldo Ferreira; United Socialist Workers' Party (PSTU)	16	No coalition (PSTU)
General Theophilo; Brazilian Social Democracy Party (PSDB)	Roberto Cláudio	Emília Pessoa; Brazilian Social Democracy Party (PSDB)	45	It's Time To Change (PSDB, PROS)
Hélio Góis; Social Liberal Party (PSL)		Ninon Tauchmann; Social Liberal Party (PSL)	17	No coalition (PSL)

Rejected candidacies

On September 4, 2018, the Regional Electoral Court of Ceará (TRE-CE) rejected the Statement of Regularity of Party Acts (SRPA) of the Workers' Cause Party (PCO) due to the absence of a regularly constituted directory in the State. Because of this, the candidacy of Mikaelton Carantino and the other candidates launched by the party in other positions were rejected. At the end of the month, Carantino resigned to his candidacy and announced he was leaving the party. His name, however, was included in the DRE voting machine.

Candidate for Governor	Candidate for Vice Governor	Electoral Number	Coalition/Party
Mikaelton Carantino; Workers' Cause Party (PCO)	Lino Alves; Workers' Cause Party (PCO)	29	No coalition (PCO)

=== Senator ===
Candidate for Senator	Candidates for Alternate Senator	Electoral Number	Coalition/Party
Cid Gomes; Democratic Labour Party (PDT)	1º: Prisco Bezerra (PDT); 2º: Júlio Ventura (PDT)	123	For a Stronger Ceará (PT, PDT, PP, PSB, PR, PTB, DEM, PCdoB, PPS, PRP, PV, PMN, PPL, PATRI, PRTB, PMB)
Anna Karina; Socialism and Liberty Party (PSOL)	1º: Ana Vládia (PSOL); 2º: Nercilda Rocha (PSOL)	505	Left Socialist Front (PSOL, PCB)
Pastor Simões; Socialism and Liberty Party (PSOL)	1º: Alexandre Uchôa (PSOL); 2º: Chiquinho do Tururu (PSOL)	500	Left Socialist Front (PSOL, PCB)
Dr.ª Mayra; Brazilian Social Democracy Party (PSDB)	1º: Rosenberg Freitas (PSDB); 2º: José Nilson (PSDB)	456	It's Time To Change (PSDB, PROS)
Eduardo Girão; Republican Party of the Social Order (PROS)	1º: Sargento Reginauro (PROS); 2º: Dr. Guimarães (PROS)	900	It's Time To Change (PSDB, PROS)
Márcio Pinheiro; Social Liberal Party (PSL)	1º: Albino Oliveira (PSL); 2º: Inspetor Alberto (PSL)	178	No coalition (PSL)
Pedro Ribeiro; Social Liberal Party (PSL)	1º: Dr. Wilson Matos (PSL); 2º: Fátima Ribeiro (PSL)	177	No coalition (PSL)
Eunício Oliveira; Brazilian Democratic Movement (MDB)	1º: Jorge Rios (MDB); 2º: Alceu Barros (MDB)	151	The Strength of The People (MDB, PHS, AVANTE, SD, PSD, PSC, PODE, PRB)
João Saraiva; Sustainability Network (REDE)	1º: Paulo Roberto (REDE); 2º: Prof. Pedro Jorge (REDE)	180	No coalition (REDE)

Rejected candidacies

On August 27, 2018, the Regional Electoral Court of Ceará (TRE-CE) rejected the candidacy of José Alberto Bardawil on the grounds that "the applicant was not chosen at a convention and presented only one candidate as an alternate senator", in this case, his own brother Walter Bardawil. The party he was affiliated with, Podemos (PODE), had already launched Eunício Oliveira in a majority coalition with the Brazilian Democratic Movement (MDB). Subsequently, Bardawil announces his resignation from the candidacy. Like the candidate for governor by the Workers' Cause Party (PCO), Mikaelton Carantino, the candidacy of Alexandre Barroso was also rejected by the TRE-CE. Despite the rejections, the names of Barroso and Burns were included in the DRE voting machine.

Candidate for Senator	Candidate for Alternate Senator	Electoral Number	Coalition/Party
Alberto Bardawil; Podemos (PODE)	1º: Walter Bardawil (PODE) (Note: There was only one alternate senator on the ticket.)	190	The Strength of The People (MDB, PHS, AVANTE, SD, PSD, PSC, PODE, PRB)
Alexandre Barroso; Workers' Cause Party (PCO)	1º: Ronald Medeiros (PCO); 2º: Patrícia Braga (PCO)	290	No coalition (PCO)
Geraldo Magela Filho; United Socialist Workers' Party (PSTU)	1º: Roberto da Paz (PSTU); 2º: Maximiano Moura (PSTU)	160	No coalition (PSTU)
Robert Burns; Christian Labour Party (PTC)	1º: Nonatinho de Freitas (PTC); 2º: Raimunda Gomes (PTC)	360	No coalition (PTC)

== Results ==
=== Government of Ceará ===
Candidate	Party	Running mate	Party	First round	
Candidate	Party	Running mate	Party	Votes	%
Camilo Santana	PT	Izolda Cela	PDT	3.457.556	79,96%
General Theophilo	PSDB	Emília Pessoa	PSDB	488.438	11,30%
Hélio Góis	PSL	Ninon Tauchmann	PSL	282.456	6,53%
Ailton Lopes	PSOL	Carina Costa	PSOL	90.611	2,10%
Francisco Gonzaga	PSTU	Reginaldo Ferreira	PSTU	5.060	0,12%
Mikaelton Carantino (Note: He received 694 votes, which were considered null for the vote counting due to the rejection of his candidacy.)	PCO	Lino Alves	PCO	0	0%
Invalid/blank votes				919.369	–
Cancelled votes				694	–
Total				4.324.121	68,16%
Registered voters/turnout				6.344.483	100%

=== Federal Senate ===
Candidate	Party	Votes	%
Cid Gomes	PDT	3.228.533	41,62%
Eduardo Girão	PROS	1.325.786	17,09%
Eunício Oliveira	MDB	1.313.793	16,93%
Dr.ª Mayra	PSDB	882.019	11,37%
Pastor Pedro Ribeiro	PSL	334.561	4,31%
Anna Karina	PSOL	316.922	4,09%
Dr. Márcio Pinheiro	PSL	183.949	2,37%
Pastor Simões	PSOL	150.644	1,94%
João Saraiva	REDE	21.654	0,28%
Robert Burns (Note: He received 13.751 votes, which were considered null for the vote counting due to the rejection of his candidacy.)	PTC	0	0%
Alexandre Barroso (Note: He received 11.393 votes, which were considered null for the vote counting due to the rejection of his candidacy.)	PCO	0	0%
Invalid/blank votes		2.729.119	–
Cancelled votes		25.144	–
Total		7.757.861	68,16%
Registered voters/turnout		6.344.483	100%
Source: UOL

== See also ==
- Brazilian general elections, 2018
- 2014 Ceará gubernatorial election
- Elections in Brazil
