= Elmano de Freitas =

Brazilian politician

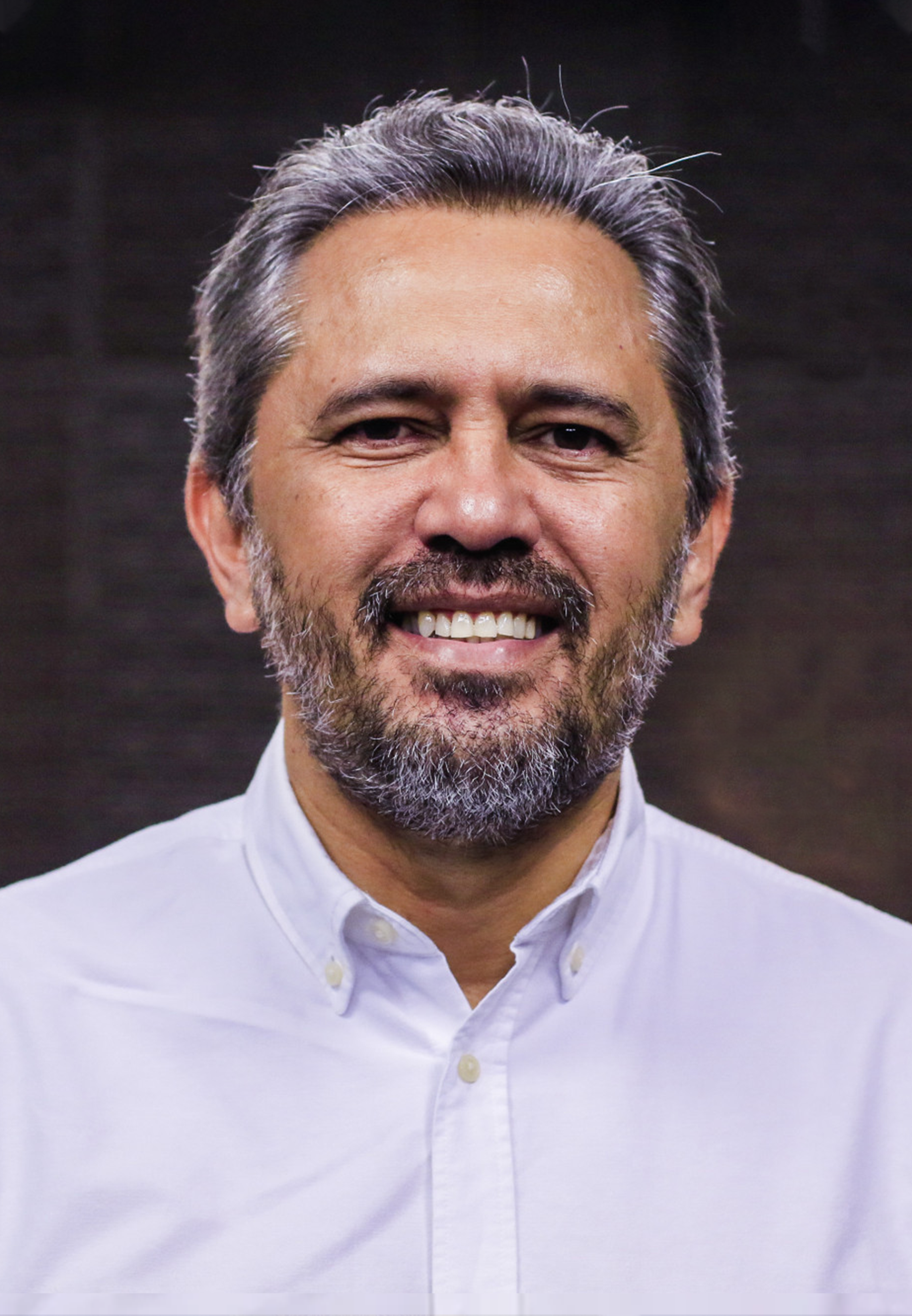
- Freitas in 2023

Governor of Ceará
- Incumbent
- Assumed office 1 January 2023
- Vice Governor: Jade Romero
- Preceded by: Izolda Cela

Member of the Legislative Assembly of Ceará
- In office 1 February 2015 – 30 December 2022
- Constituency: At-large

Municipal Secretary of Education of Fortaleza
- In office 1 September 2011 – 31 December 2012
- Mayor: Luizianne Lins
- Preceded by: Ana Maria de Carvalho Fontenele
- Succeeded by: Ivo Gomes

Personal details
- Born: Elmano de Freitas da Costa; 12 April 1970 (age 56) Baturité, Ceará, Brazil
- Party: PT (1989–present)
- Education: Federal University of Ceará
- Occupation: Lawyer

Elmano de Freitas da Costa (born 12 April 1970) is a Brazilian lawyer and politician. Affiliated with the Workers' Party (PT), he has been the governor of the state of Ceará since 2023.

Having graduated with a law degree from the Federal University of Ceará, he started his legal career and political inclinations working with labor unions and social movements. He started his political career in 1996, when he was a candidate for the city council of his hometown of Baturité, but was not elected. Between 2011 and 2012, he was the Municipal Secretary of Education of Fortaleza during the mayoralty of Luizianne Lins. He later would run for the state legislature in 2014 and 2018, and later would run for governor in 2022.

== Early life and work ==
Freitas was born on 12 April 1970 in Baturité, one of five children of teacher Elma de Freitas da Costa and farmer Francisco Feitosa da Costa. Elmano began his activism in Baturité, where he became part of the local basic ecclesial community with the Catholic church, teaching children who did not attend school to read. At 15, he moved with his brothers to Fortaleza to study, with him graduating from the law school of the Federal University of Ceará. There, he became involved with the student activists' movement and the Student's Central Directory. During his time in advocacy, he went on to provide legal and political defense for labor unions and social movements such as the Landless Workers' Movement, as well as coordinating the National Network of Lawyers and Peoples' Lawyers between 2001 and 2009.

== Political career ==
A member of the Workers' Party since 1989, he had been the leader of the state's directory at one point for 8 years. Freitas first participated in an election in 1996, when his name was put on a list of candidates for Baturité's city council, but did not campaign because he helped Lins, also from the PT, in her candidacy for a vacant seat on Fortaleza's Municipal Council. She had ultimately won the election. He ended up being the least voted on the party line in Baturité's elections, having only received 4 votes.

In 2008, he coordinated Lins' reelection campaign for mayor, and in the following year, during her second mandate, he led the Peoples' Participation commission in her cabinet, afterwards becoming, between 2011 and 2012, the municipal Secretary of Education.

In 2012, Freitas became a candidate for the mayoralty of Fortaleza under the To Care For People coalition, with doctor Antônio Mourão of the Liberal Party (PL) as his vice-mayoral candidate and Lins supporting his campaign to succeed her. He came in first during the first round with 318,262 votes, or 25.44% of votes, and winning 51 neighborhoods. He faced Roberto Cláudio of the PSB, losing to him with 650,607 votes (53.02%) for Cláudio and 576,435 (46.98%) for Freitas. In 2013, Freitas was elected president of Fortaleza's PT branch with 60.84% of the vote, being in the position until 2017.

In 2014, he became a candidate for state deputy and was elected with 44,292 votes in 2014, winning reelection in 2018 with 68,594. During his time in the Legislative Assembly of Ceará, Freitas had proposed and passed more than 30 laws, led the PT's faction in the assembly, presided over the Social Defense commission and the High Studies and Strategic Subjects council. He was the reporter for the CPI that investigated the involvement of military police associations during a riot in Ceará in 2020. In 2019, he received the Clóvis Beviláqua Medal of Judiciary Merit, the highest honor of the State Commons' Court of the State of Ceará for his contributions towards the state judiciary during his time as state deputy. Along with his time on the commission, he headed the Superior School of the Parliament of Ceará in 2017.

In 2016, Freitas was the vice-mayoral candidate with Luizianne Lins for the mayoralty of Fortaleza for the PT, receiving 193,687 (15.06%) and ending in 3rd place. In 2020, he ran for mayor in the city of Caucaia with businesswoman Natécia Campos of the Progressistas in the Caucaia with the Courage to Change coalition, obtaining 13,018 votes (7.69%), ending in 4th place.

In 2022, he became a candidate to become governor of Ceará for the Ceará Stronger Each Time coalition, with Jade Romero of the Brazilian Democratic Movement (MDB). Freitas was chosen by the PT during a conflict between the state alliance with the Democratic Labour Party (PDT), which preferred their candidate, then-governor and former vice-governor Izolda Cela who came to office after governor Camilo Santana (PT) became a candidate for senator that year, to the detriment to party colleague Roberto Cláudio to succeed in state government. Associating himself with the support of both Santana and Cela, Freitas won the election with 2,808,300 votes, or 54.02% of the vote, removing the need for a second round. He received the majority of votes in 178 cities in Ceará, while his adversaries in the election, Capitão Wagner and Roberto Cláudio, won in 5 cities and 1 city, respectively.
