= Roberto Cláudio =

Brazilian politician

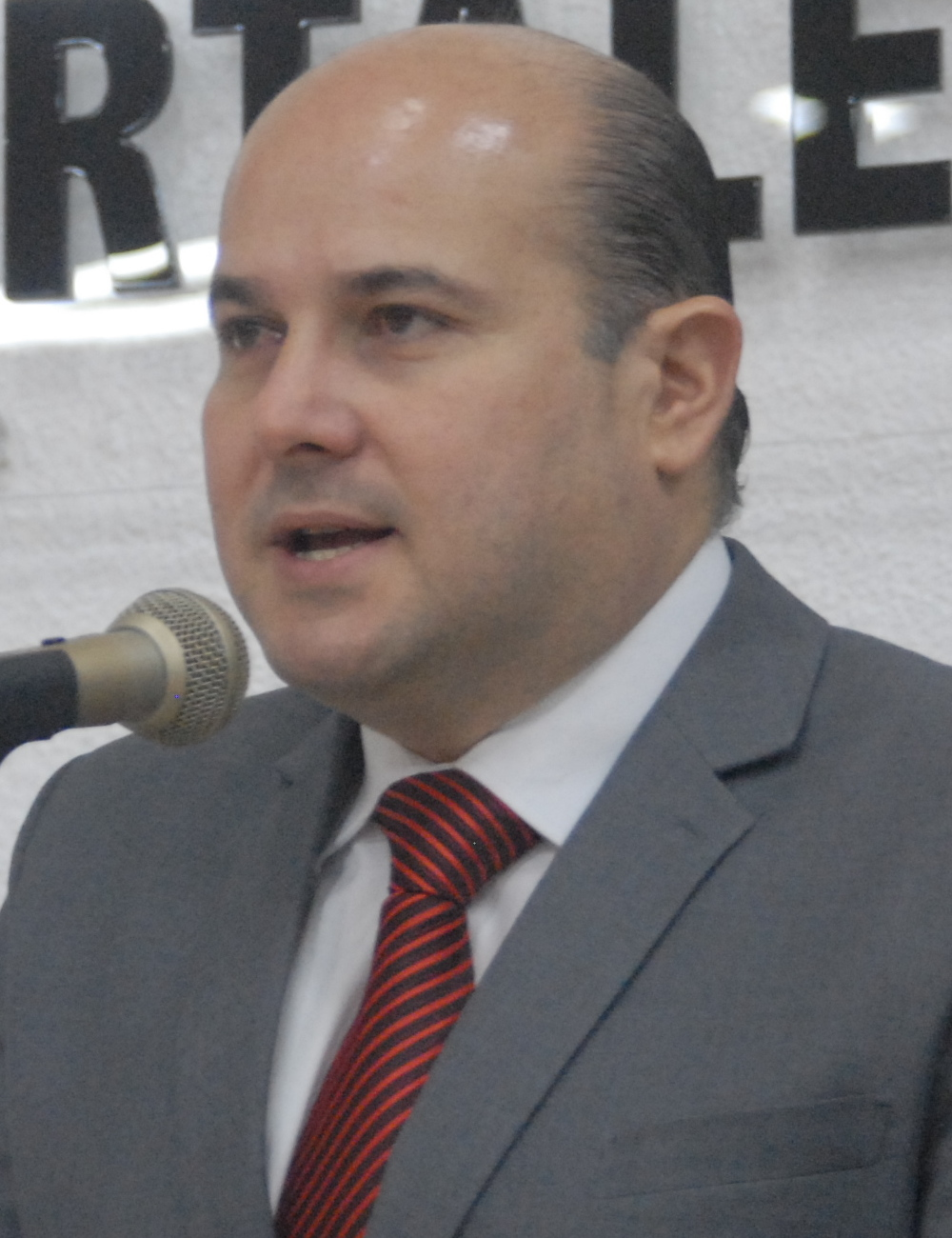

Mayor of Fortaleza
- In office 1 January 2013 – 31 December 2020
- Vice Mayor: Gaudêncio Lucena (2013–2016); Moroni Torgan (2017–2020)
- Preceded by: Luizianne Lins
- Succeeded by: José Sarto

President of the Legislative Assembly of Ceará
- In office 10 February 2011 – 28 December 2012
- Vice President: José Sarto
- Preceded by: Domingos Filho
- Succeeded by: José Sarto (interim)

Member of the Legislative Assembly of Ceará
- In office 1 February 2007 – 28 December 2012
- Constituency: At-large

Personal details
- Born: Roberto Cláudio Rodrigues Bezerra
- Party: PDT (2015–present)
- Other political affiliations: PROS (2013–2015); PSB (2007–2013); PHS (2006–2007)
- Spouse: Carolina Bezerra
- Children: 2
- Education: Federal University of Ceará; University of Arizona

Roberto Cláudio Rodrigues Bezerra (Brazilian Portuguese: [ʁoˈbɛʁtu ˈklawdʒu ʁoˈdɾiɡiz beˈzeʁɐ]) is a Brazilian politician, the former mayor of Fortaleza, the fifth largest city in Brazil, from 2013 to 2021.

Roberto Cláudio (as he is known in politics) is a doctor, graduated from the Federal University of Ceará, in Fortaleza, and has a PhD degree in Public Health from the University of Arizona, in the United States.

He was elected mayor of Fortaleza in the second round of the municipal elections held on October 28, 2012, defeating Elmano de Freitas.

== Electoral history ==
Year	Election	Party	Office	Coalition	Partners	Votes	Percent	Result	Ref.
2008	State Elections of Ceará	PHS	State Deputy	Ceará Vote To Grow (PSB, PT, PMDB, PP, PCdoB, PV, PRB, PHS, PMN)	None	37,245	0.52%	Elected	
2010	State Elections of Ceará	PSB	State Deputy	For a Better Ceará for All (PSB, PMDB, PT, PDT, PCdoB, PSC, PRB)	None	68,469	1.68%	Elected	
2012	Fortaleza Mayoral Election	PSB	Mayor	To Renew Fortaleza (PSB, PMDB, PRB, PP, PTB, PSL, PSDC, PHS, PMN, PTC, PRP, PEN, PSD, PTdoB)	Gaudêncio Lucena (PMDB)	650,607	53.02%	Elected	
2016	Fortaleza Mayoral Election	PDT	Mayor	Fortaleza Only Has to Win (PDT, DEM, PP, PEN, PSC, PSDC, PRTB, PTC, PPS, PTN, PPL, PSL, PV, PTB, PSD, PROS, PMB, PCdoB)	Moroni Torgan (DEM)	678,847	53.57%	Elected	
2022	Ceará Gubernatorial Election	PDT	Governor	From the People, By the People and For the People (PDT, PSD, PSB, PMN, Patriota, Agir, PMB, PSC, DC)	Domingos Filho (PSD)	734,976	14.14%	Lost	

== See also ==
- List of mayors of Fortaleza
