= Brazil of Hope =

Political alliance in Brazil

Brazil of Hope Brasil da Esperança
- Abbreviation: FE Brasil
- Leader: Luiz Inácio Lula da Silva
- President: Luciana Santos
- 1st Vice President: Gleisi Hoffmann
- 2nd Vice President: José Luiz Penna
- Founded: 18 April 2022; 4 years ago
- Registered: 24 May 2022; 4 years ago
- Membership (2022): 2,402,060
- Political position: Centre-left
- Party members: Workers' Party; Communist Party of Brazil; Green Party
- Chamber of Deputies: 81 / 513
- Federal Senate: 9 / 81

Website
- febrasil.org.br

The Brazil of Hope Federation (Portuguese: Federação Brasil da Esperança) or FE Brasil is an electoral and parliamentary group formed by the Workers' Party (PT), Communist Party of Brazil (PCdoB) and Green Party (PV) on 18 April 2022 in preparation for the 2022 general election.

== History ==
=== Background ===
In 2017, the Brazilian National Congress approved a constitutional amendment which abolished legislative coalitions and established an electoral threshold to receive party subsidies. The electoral reform aimed to decrease the effective number of parties in Brazil. After the reform, smaller parties wanted to create a new mechanism to help them win seats, with many proposing single non-transferable vote. In 2021, it was approved the creation of party federations, based on the Broad Front model.

After the federations approved, there began talks to form left-of-center federations, which began official talks to form a federation between the Workers' Party, the Brazilian Socialist Party (PSB), the Socialism and Liberty Party (PSOL), the Communist Party of Brazil and the Green Party in late 2021. PSOL quickly left the negotiations, preferring to focus on a federation with the Sustainability Network (REDE). Negotiations between PT and PSB got into advanced stages, with a broad majority of PSB politicians wanting to join the PT-lead federation, but PSB withdrew from the federation because of disagreements over São Paulo, especially due to the gubernatorial and mayoral candidates.

=== Formation ===
In April 2022, PT, PCdoB and PV approved a federation and subsequently sent it to the Superior Electoral Court. It was approved and the federation was officially formed.

== Composition ==
The federation consists of three (3) political parties:

Party	Portuguese	Leader	Ideology	Deputies	Senators
Workers' Party	Partido dos Trabalhadores (PT)	Gleisi Hoffmann	Social liberalism	68 / 513	8 / 81
Communist Party of Brazil	Partido Comunista do Brasil (PCdoB)	Luciana Santos	Developmentalism	7 / 513	0 / 81
Green Party	Partido Verde (PV)	José Luiz Penna	Green politics	6 / 513	0 / 81

== Electoral history ==
=== Legislative elections ===
Election	Chamber of Deputies				Federal Senate				Status
Election	Votes	%	Seats	+/–	Votes	%	Seats	+/–	Status
2022	15,354,125	13.93	81 / 513	New	13,231,163	13.01	9 / 81	New	Coalition
2026	17,467,987	14.81	88 / 513	▲7	27,312,642	13.16	9 / 81	Steady	Coalition
