= PSDB Cidadania Federation =

Parliamentary bloc in Brazil

PSDB Cidadania Federation Federação PSDB Cidadania
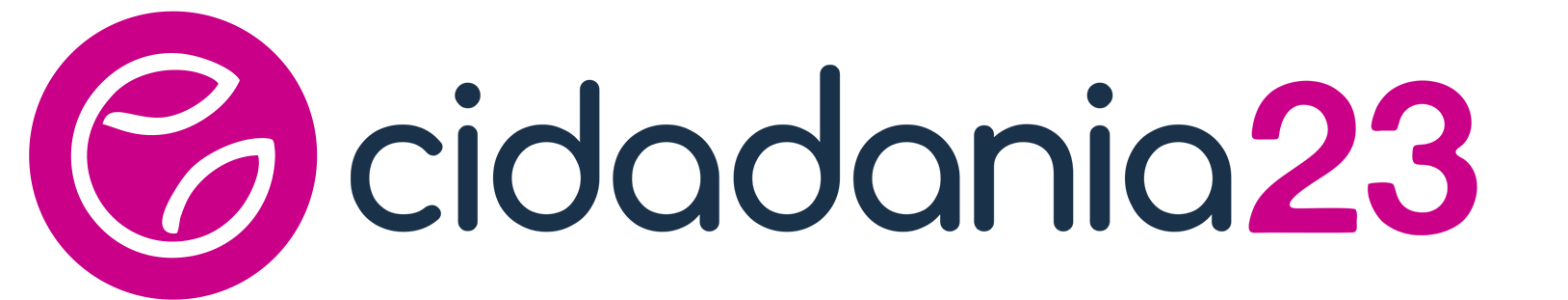
- President: Marconi Perillo
- General Secretary: Antônio Cesar Gontijo
- Vice President: Comte Bittencourt
- Founded: 17 May 2022; 4 years ago
- Registered: 26 May 2022; 4 years ago
- Membership (2022): 1,806,172 affiliates
- Ideology: Liberalism (Brazilian); Third Way
- Political position: Centre to centre-right
- Party members: Brazilian Social Democracy Party; Cidadania
- Chamber of Deputies: 20 / 513
- Federal Senate: 4 / 81

The PSDB Cidadania Federation (Portuguese: Federação PSDB Cidadania), participating in elections also as the Always Forward Federation (Portuguese: Federação Sempre pra Frente), is an electoral and parliamentary group formed by the Brazilian Social Democracy Party (PSDB) and Cidadania. Its program and statute were published on 11 May 2022 and registered by the Superior Electoral Court on 26 May.

In 2025, Cidadania's national directory voted unanimously to end the federation in 2026 (in accordance with Brazilian electoral law, which mandates a minimum four-year duration for party federations following their official registration), alleging that the partnership had been disadvantageous to Cidadania, citing reductions in its representation at the municipal, state and federal levels. However, the federation was renewed in 2026.

== Composition ==
The federation consists of two political parties:

Party	Portuguese	Leader	Ideology	Position	Deputies	Senators
Brazilian Social Democracy Party	Partido da Social Democracia Brasileira (PSDB)	Marconi Perillo	Third Way; Social liberalism; Neoliberalism; Historical: Social democracy	Centre to centre-right; Historical, now minority: Centre to centre-left	18 / 513	4 / 81
Citizenship	Cidadania	Comte Bittencourt	Social liberalism; Parliamentarism; Federalism; Historical: Social democracy; Democratic socialism	Centre to centre-right; Historical: Centre-left	2 / 513	0 / 81

== Election results ==
=== Legislative elections ===
Election	Chamber of Deputies				Federal Senate				Role in government
Election	Votes	%	Seats	+/–	Votes	%	Seats	+/–	Role in government
2022	5,000,910	4.54%	18 / 513	New	1,394,547	1.37%	4 / 81	New	Opposition
2026	3,131,177	2.75%	11 / 513	-7	2,995,475	1.44%	2 / 81	style="background:#FFC7C7;color:black;vertical-align:middle;text-align:center;" class="table-no skin-invert"|Opposition	
