= PSOL REDE Federation =

PSOL REDE Federation Federação PSOL REDE
- President: Guilherme Boulos
- General Secretary: Roberto Robaína
- Vice President: Heloísa Helena
- Founded: 17 May 2022; 4 years ago
- Registered: 26 May 2022; 4 years ago
- Membership (2022): 259,441 affiliates
- Ideology: Progressivism; Environmentalism
- Political position: Centre-left to left-wing
- Party members: Socialism and Liberty Party; Sustainability Network
- Chamber of Deputies: 14 / 513
- Federal Senate: 0 / 81

The PSOL REDE Federation (Portuguese: Federação PSOL REDE) is an electoral and parliamentary group formed by the Socialism and Liberty Party (PSOL) and Sustainability Network (REDE). Its program and statute were published on 17 May 2022 and registered by the Superior Electoral Court on 26 May.

== Composition ==
Party	Portuguese	Leader	Ideology	Position	Deputies	Senators
Socialism and Liberty Party	Partido Socialismo e Liberdade (PSOL)	Paula Coradi	Democratic socialism	Left-wing to far-left	13 / 513	0 / 81
Sustainability Network	Rede Sustentabilidade (REDE)	Heloísa Helena; Wesley Diógenes	Environmentalism; Green politics	Centre-left	1 / 513	0 / 81

== Electoral history ==
=== Legislative elections ===
Election	Chamber of Deputies				Federal Senate				Role in government
Election	Votes	%	Seats	+/–	Votes	%	Seats	+/–	Role in government
2022	4,650,080	4.22%	14 / 513	New	685,478	0.68%	1 / 81	New	Coalition
2026	TBD	4.91	15 / 513	▲1	TBD	5.20	1 / 81	Steady	Coalition
