= Cid Gomes =

Brazilian politician and engineer

- Official portrait

Senator for Ceará
- Incumbent
- Assumed office 1 February 2019
- Preceded by: Eunício Oliveira

Minister of Education
- In office 1 January 2015 – 18 March 2015
- President: Dilma Rousseff
- Preceded by: José Henrique Paim
- Succeeded by: Renato Janine Ribeiro

Governor of Ceará
- In office 1 January 2007 – 31 December 2014
- Vice Governor: Francisco José Pinheiro (2007–2010); Domingos Filho (2011–2014)
- Preceded by: Lúcio Alcântara
- Succeeded by: Camilo Santana

Mayor of Sobral
- In office 1 January 1997 – 31 December 2004
- Vice Mayor: Edilson Aragão
- Preceded by: Aldenor Façanha Júnior
- Succeeded by: Leônidas Cristino

Personal details
- Born: 27 April 1963 (age 63) Sobral, Ceará, Brazil
- Party: PSB (since 2024)
- Other political affiliations: PMDB (1983–1990); PSDB (1990–1997); PPS (1997–2005); PSB (2005–2013); PROS (2013–2015); PDT (2015–2024)
- Spouse: Maria Célia Habib Moura
- Children: 3
- Relatives: Ciro Gomes (brother)
- Education: Federal University of Ceará
- Profession: Engineer

Cid Ferreira Gomes (born 27 April 1963) is a Brazilian politician who serves as a Senator for the state of Ceará since 2019. He is a member of the Brazilian Socialist Party (PSB) since 2024, and is the brother of fellow Brazilian politician Ciro Gomes.

Gomes is the former Governor of Ceará. During his governorship, his vice governor was Francisco José Pinheiro. On 1 January 2015 he was named Minister of Education of Brazil in the cabinet of Dilma Rousseff, and served until 18 March of that same year. On 19 February 2020, Gomes was shot after using a bulldozer to remove a barricade built by a group of masked military police officers during an illegal demonstration in Sobral, Ceará.
