= Camilo Santana =

Brazilian agricultural engineer and politician

Senator for Ceará
- Incumbent
- Assumed office 1 February 2023

Minister of Education
- In office 1 January 2023 – 2 April 2026
- President: Luiz Inácio Lula da Silva
- Preceded by: Victor Godoy
- Succeeded by: Leonardo Barchini

Governor of Ceará
- In office 1 January 2015 – 2 April 2022
- Vice Governor: Izolda Cela
- Preceded by: Cid Gomes
- Succeeded by: Izolda Cela

State Deputy of Ceará
- In office 1 January 2011 – 31 December 2014
- Constituency: At-large

Personal details
- Born: Camilo Sobreira de Santana; 3 June 1968 (age 58) Crato, Ceará, Brazil
- Party: PT (2002–present)
- Other political affiliations: PSB (1990–2002)
- Domestic partner: Onelia Leite (m. 2010)
- Children: 3
- Education: Federal University of Ceará (BSAg)
- Profession: Agricultural engineer

Camilo Sobreira de Santana (born 3 June 1968) is a Brazilian agricultural engineer and politician, affiliated to the Workers' Party (PT), currently serving as Senator for Ceará. He served as the Brazilian Minister of Education from 2023 to 2026. He has a bachelor's degree in agricultural engineering from the Federal University of Ceará and a master's degree in Development and Environment from the same university. As an undergraduate, he held the director function UFC Students of Central Directory. He was Secretary of Agrarian Development of the State of Ceará in the government of Cid Gomes, from 1 February 2007 to 31 December 2010, as well as Secretary of Cities in the same government.

He was voted the most voted state deputy of Ceará in October 2010, with 131,171 votes. He was governor of the state of Ceará until 2 April 2022, when he resigned in order to run for Federal Senate.

== Election to the government ==
Santana's candidature for the government of Ceará was made official on 29 June in Fortaleza, during collective agreement of PROS, PT and other parties allied with the coalition led by the governor Cid Gomes. The convention was marked, however, by uncertainty about the indications to Senator and Vice-Governor of the coalition. Santana had previously been considered for the top post of the state executive, but did not include the list of favorites for the position, dominated by PROS members.

Santana was elected governor of Ceará on 26 October 2014. His victory was given as mathematically certain even before the official confirmation by the Superior Electoral Court.

== Political life after the governorship ==
Santana, a member of the Workers' Party, chose to endorse Ciro Gomes (PDT), himself a former Governor of Ceará, over Fernando Haddad, a fellow member of his party, in the 2018 Brazilian presidential election.

During Luiz Inácio Lula da Silva's second presidency, Santana became Minister of Education. He began the role on January 1, 2023.

Political offices
Preceded by Cid Gomes	Governor of Ceará; 2015–2022	Succeeded by Izolda Cela
Preceded by Victor Godoy	Minister of Education; 2023–present	Incumbent
