= Republican Party of the Social Order =

Political party in Brazil

Republican Party of the Social Order Partido Republicano da Ordem Social
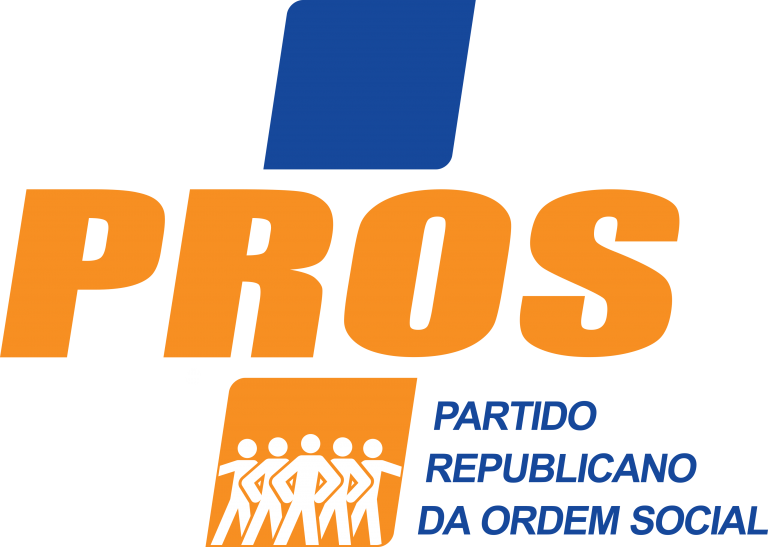
- President: Marcus Vinícius Chaves de Holanda
- Founded: 1 January 2010; 16 years ago
- Legalised: 24 September 2013; 12 years ago
- Dissolved: 14 February 2023; 3 years ago
- Merged into: Solidarity
- Membership: 90,947
- Ideology: Third Way; Republicanism
- Political position: Centre
- Colours: Blue; Orange
- TSE Identification Number: 90

Website
- pros.org.br

The Republican Party of the Social Order (Portuguese: Partido Republicano da Ordem Social, PROS) was a political party in Brazil, founded in 2010, and officially recognized in 2013.

In the 2018 Brazilian general election, PROS allied with the Workers Party and the Communist Party of Brazil to support the Presidential pre-candidacy of former President Luiz Inácio Lula da Silva and former Mayor of São Paulo Fernando Haddad. After Lula was declared ineligible to contest the election, PROS supported Haddad and his running mate Manuela d'Ávila as part of the alliance "The People Happy Again," remaining allied with PT and PCdoB.

In the 2022 Brazilian general election, PROS allied with the Brazil of Hope coalition, with the main members being Workers Party, the Communist Party of Brazil, PSOL REDE Federation, and the Brazilian Socialist Party to support the pre-candidacy of former President Luiz Inácio Lula da Silva and former Governor of Sao Paulo Geraldo Alckmin as part of the alliance "Let's go together for Brazil".

Following the elections, the party announced plans to merge with Solidarity. The Superior Electoral Court approved the merger on February 14, 2023.

== Electoral results ==
=== Presidential elections ===
Year	Candidate	Votes	%
2014	No candidate, endorsed Dilma Rousseff		
2018	No candidate, endorsed Fernando Haddad		
2022	No candidate, endorsed Lula da Silva		

=== Legislative elections ===
Election	Chamber of Deputies				Federal Senate				Role in government
Election	Votes	%	Seats	+/–	Votes	%	Seats	+/–	Role in government
2014	1,977,117	2.03%	11 / 513	New	2,234,132	2.50%	1 / 81	New	Coalition
2018	2,042,610	2.08%	8 / 513	▼3	1,370,513	0.80%	0 / 81	0	Coalition
2022	1,070,953	0.97%	3 / 513	▼5	214,525	0.21%	1 / 81	0	Coalition
