= 2024 Fortaleza mayoral election =

2024 Fortaleza municipal election
- 6 October 2024 (first round); 27 October 2024 (second round)
- Turnout: 84.48% (first round); 84.16% (second round)
- Mayoral election
- Opinion polls
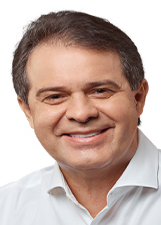

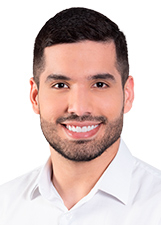
Candidate	Evandro Leitão	André Fernandes
Party	PT	PL
Running mate	Gabriella Aguiar	Alcyvania Pinheiro
Popular vote	716,133	705,295
Percentage	50.38%	49.62%
Result by electoral zone in the second round
Evandro Leitão (7):
50% to 52% (4)
52% to 54% (2)
54% to 56% (113ª ZE)
André Fernandes (10):
50% to 52% (9)
52% to 54% (112ª ZE)
Mayor before election
José Sarto
PDT
Elected mayor
Evandro Leitão
PT
- Parliamentary election
Party	Leader	Current seats
Municipal Chamber
PDT	—N/a	12
PSD	—N/a	7
Avante	—N/a	5
FE Brasil	—N/a	3
PSDB-Cidadania	—N/a	3
PSB	—N/a	2
PSOL-REDE	—N/a	2
PL	—N/a	2
Agir	—N/a	1
Republicanos	—N/a	1
UNIÃO	—N/a	1
PRD	—N/a	1
MOBILIZA	—N/a	1
DEMOCRATA	—N/a	1
Solidarity	—N/a	1

The 2024 Fortaleza mayoral election took place on 6 October 2024. Voters elected a mayor, a vice mayor, and 43 councillors. The incumbent mayor, José Sarto, a member of the Democratic Labour Party (PDT), was elected in 2020 for his first term and intends to run for reelection.

Candidates André Fernandes (PL) and Evandro Leitão (PT) were the most voted and advanced for a runoff, held on 27 October 2024. Leitão was elected with 50.38% of the valid votes. The mayor's term will begin on 1 January 2025 and end on 31 December 2028.

== Background ==
=== 2020 election and Sarto's government ===
The last mayoral election in Fortaleza, held in 2020, resulted in the victory of the physician José Sarto Nogueira (PDT) in the second round. Sarto obtained 668,652 votes (51.69% of the valid votes), compared to the 624,892 votes (48.31% of the valid votes) obtained by Capitão Wagner (PROS). Sarto's victory represented the victory of a "government of continuity", since the incumbent mayor at the time, Roberto Cláudio, who is also a member of the party, was his main electoral canvasser throughout the election.

Starting in January 2021, Sarto's government was disapproved by more than 50% of the citizens of Fortaleza in opinion polls, and, despite his approval ratings improved throughout 2023 due to a program of investments and interventions in the city, his government disapproval rating was ranked in fourth among the mayors of the 26 Brazilian capitals in a report published by Atlasintel in January 2024. On this opinion poll, Sarto's government was disapproved by 45% of those who were interviewed and only 25% approved his government.

=== Electorate ===
In 2024, Fortaleza has 1,765,629 people eligible to vote, which corresponds to around 73% of its total population (2,428,708) according to the 2022 Brazilian demographic census. The city is divided into 17 electoral zones (1st, 2nd, 3rd, 80th, 82nd, 83rd, 85th, 93rd, 94th, 95th, 112th, 113th, 114th, 115th, 116th, 117th and 118th), with 669 polling stations and 5,400 electoral sections.

== Electoral calendar ==
Electoral calendar announced by the Superior Electoral Court (TSE) on 3 January 2024
7 March – 5 April	Period of the 'party window' for councillors. During this period, the councillors are able to move to other political parties in order to run for election while not losing their respective political terms.
6 April	Deadline for all parties and party federations to obtain the registration of their statutes at the Superior Electoral Court and for all candidates to have their electoral domicile in the constituency in which they wish to contest the elections with the affiliation granted by the party.
15 May	Start of the preliminary fundraising campaign in the form of collective financing for potential candidates. During this period, candidates are not allowed to ask for votes and are still subjected to obey the rules regarding electoral propaganda on the Internet.
20 July – 5 August	On this date, party conventions begin to deliberate on coalitions and choose candidates for mayors and councillors tickets. Parties have until 15 August to register their names with the Brazilian Election Justice.
16 August	Beginning of electoral campaigns on an equal basis, with any advertising or demonstration explicitly requesting for votes before the date being considered irregular and subject to fines.
30 August –3 October	Broadcasting of free electoral propaganda on radio and television.
6 October	Date of mayoral elections.
27 October	Date of a possible second round in cities with more than 200,000 voters in which the most voted candidate for mayor has not reached 50% of the valid votes.

== Candidates ==
=== Presumptive candidates ===
Party	Mayoral candidate	Running mate		Coalition
Workers' Party (PT 13)	Evandro Leitão; State Deputy of Ceará (since 2015)	TBA	TBA	FE Brasil (PT, PCdoB, PV); Brazilian Socialist Party (PSB); Social Democratic Party (PSD); Progressistas (PP); Brazilian Democratic Movement (MDB); Republicans; Solidarity
Socialism and Liberty Party (PSOL 50)	Técio Nunes; Cultural entrepreneur.	Sustainability Network (REDE)	Cindy Carvalho; Environmentalist	PSOL REDE Federation (PSOL, REDE)

In The Workers' Party, alongside Leitão's name, some of the party members were divided between supporting traditional names, such as Luizianne Lins, mayor of Fortaleza from 2005 to 2013 and candidate in 2016 and 2020, and some of them also supported new political figures; for example, the state deputies Larissa Gaspar and Guilherme Sampaio. The advisor of the government of Ceará, Artur Bruno, was also one of the names who were supported in the dispute. Cid Gomes' and his allies decided to join the Brazilian Socialist Party (PSB) in February 2024, a move that made it easier for the party to support the Workers' Party candidacy; since this decision, it was announced that the Brazilian Socialist Party will nominate the running mate on the Brazil of Hope's ticket. In April 2024, Evandro Leitão obtained the support of the majority of Workers' Party delegates to be the party's nominee for mayor, defeating Luizianne Lins and the other candidates who were in the race. Since the 2022 elections, the Communist Party of Brazil (PCdoB), the Workers' Party and the Green Party (PV) joined the coalition Brazil of Hope. Their main goal is to elect more councillors with the entry of Leitão's political group into the coalition. There is also negotiations between the Workers' Party and the Social Democratic Party (PSD) to form an alliance in the 2024 elections.

Among other parties, the Socialism and Freedom Party (PSOL) started a debate to launch their own candidacy or to invite parties and social movements to join its ticket, even though Adelita Monteiro's, a member of the party, is part of Elmano's government as a state secretary. The party announced Técio Nunes as a candidate in February 2024. The parties that are aligned with the Socialism and Freedom Party are the Brazilian Communist Party (PCB) and Sustainability Network (REDE); a party which is aligned with the socialists in the PSOL REDE Federation. The Sustainability Network announced a potential candidacy of the environmentalist Cindy Carvalho on 13 March 2024; due to this situation, both parties (PSOL and REDE) entered into an agreement and nominated her as the running mate of Técio Nunes on 4 May 2024.

=== Workers' Party's primaries ===
Workers' Party (PT) – Nominee

- Evandro Leitão – Member of the Legislative Assembly of Ceará (2015–present).

Eliminated in primary

- Luizianne Lins – Councillor of Fortaleza (1997–2002); Member of the Legislative Assembly of Ceará (2003–2004); Mayor of Fortaleza (2005–2013) and Member of the Chamber of Deputies from Ceará (2015–present).
- Guilherme Sampaio – Councillor of Fortaleza (2005–2021) and Member of the Legislative Assembly of Ceará (2021; 2023).
- Larissa Gaspar – Councillor of Fortaleza (2017–2023) and Member of the Legislative Assembly of Ceará (2023–present).

Primaries results

5,813 members of the Workers' Party of Fortaleza participated in the internal elections to choose a nominee for mayor. The primary was held on 7 April 2024.

Results
Candidate	Tickets (individual results)	Votes	%	Candidate	Tickets (final results)	Votes	%
Evandro Leitão ✓	110 (in support of Leitão)	1,442	24.81	Evandro Leitão ✓	110, 120, 150 and 180 (all in support of Leitão)	3,445	59.26
Evandro Leitão ✓	120 (in support of Leitão)	797	13.71	Evandro Leitão ✓	110, 120, 150 and 180 (all in support of Leitão)	3,445	59.26
Evandro Leitão ✓	150 (in support of Leitão)	642	11.04	Evandro Leitão ✓	110, 120, 150 and 180 (all in support of Leitão)	3,445	59.26
Evandro Leitão ✓	180 (in support of Leitão)	564	9.70	Evandro Leitão ✓	110, 120, 150 and 180 (all in support of Leitão)	3,445	59.26
Luizianne Lins	100 (in support of Lins)	1,686	29.00	Luizianne Lins	100 (in support of Lins)	1,686	29.00
Guilherme Sampaio	123 (in support of Sampaio)	572	9.84	Guilherme Sampaio	123 (in support of Sampaio)	572	9.84
Larissa Gaspar	140 (in support of Gaspar)	110	1.89	Larissa Gaspar	140 (in support of Gaspar)	110	1.89
Total		5,813	100.00	Total		5,813	100.00

=== Potential candidates ===
About two years before the election, Sarto stated that he could run for re-election as long as it was a Democratic Labour Party's decision. Throughout 2023, his candidacy was taken for granted by political figures of the party such as Roberto Cláudio, the interim national president of the party André Figueiredo and the former governor of Ceará Ciro Gomes. At the same time, Ciro's political group had internal disputes in the state directory with his own brother Cid Gomes, who is an ally of the governor Elmano de Freitas, from the Workers' Party (PT).

Elmano supported an alliance between the two parties, since this political alliance has been broken in a state level since the election for governor in 2022 (which was won by Elmano) and since 2012 in mayoral elections. This issue made some of the state deputies of Ceará support the candidacy of the president of the Legislative Assembly of Ceará, Evandro Leitão, for mayor in 2024. Since Leitão didn't have any space in the party to run for mayor, he left the Democratic Labour Party and joined the Workers' Party afterwards in order to run in the 2024 elections.

In February 2023, the politician Capitão Wagner, now a member of Brazil Union (UNIÃO), announced that he could run again for mayor of Fortaleza in 2024, a position for which he ran in 2016 and 2020. His optimism came from the fact that he lost the last election to Sarto by a small margin of votes and by the fact that he was also the most voted candidate in Fortaleza in the 2022 Ceará gubernatorial election. Wagner even supported an alliance with names from the conservative right in Ceará, such as the federal deputy André Fernandes, from the Liberal Party (PL), and the senator Eduardo Girão, from the New Party (NOVO). Both Fernandes and Girão announced their own candidacies in 2023. Their political groups are linked to the former president Jair Bolsonaro and to the opposition in a statewide and city level.

Brazil Union (UNIÃO)

- Capitão Wagner – Member of the Legislative Assembly of Ceará (2011–2012; 2015–2018); Councillor of Fortaleza (2013–2014) and Member of the Chamber of Deputies from Ceará (2019–2023).

Democratic Labour Party (PDT)

- José Sarto – Councillor of Fortaleza (1989–1994); President of the Municipal Chamber of Fortaleza (1990–1992); Member of the Legislative Assembly of Ceará (1995–2020); President of the Legislative Assembly of Ceará (2019–2020) and Mayor of Fortaleza (2021–present).

Liberal Party (PL)

- André Fernandes – Member of the Legislative Assembly of Ceará (2019–2023) and Member of the Chamber of Deputies from Ceará (2023–present).

New Party (NOVO)

- Eduardo Girão – Senator for Ceará (2019–present).

Popular Unity (UP)

- Haroldo Neto – Historian.

United Socialist Workers' Party (PSTU)

- Zé Batista – Union organizer and candidate for governor in the 2022 Ceará gubernatorial election.
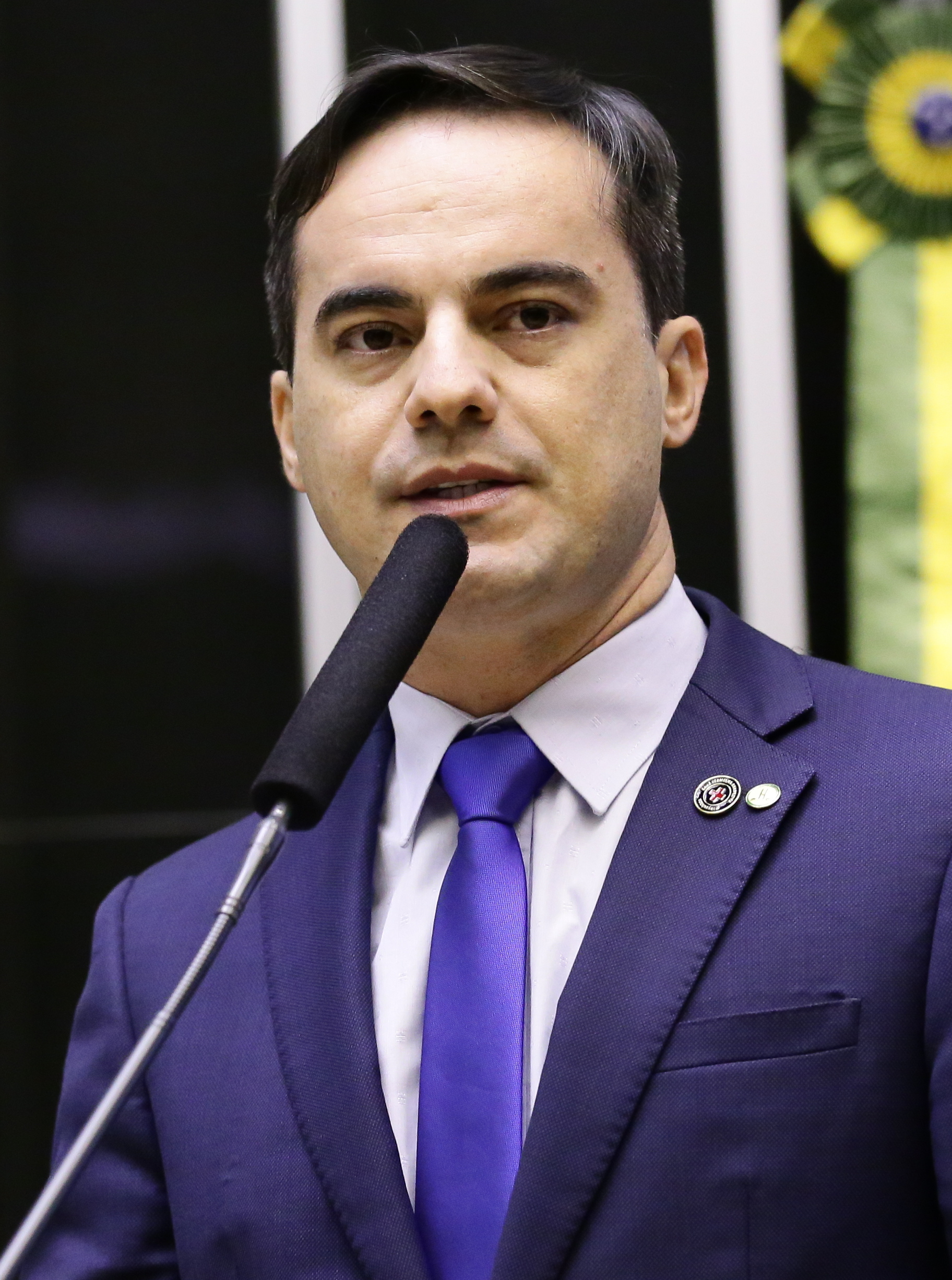
Federal Deputy
Capitão Wagner (UNIÃO)
from São Paulo

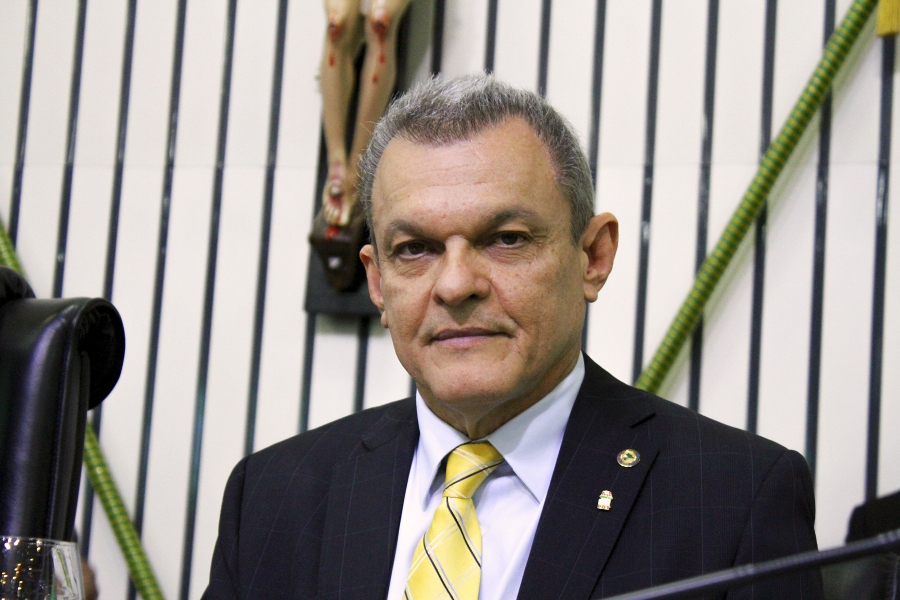
Mayor of Fortaleza
José Sarto (PDT)
from Acopiara

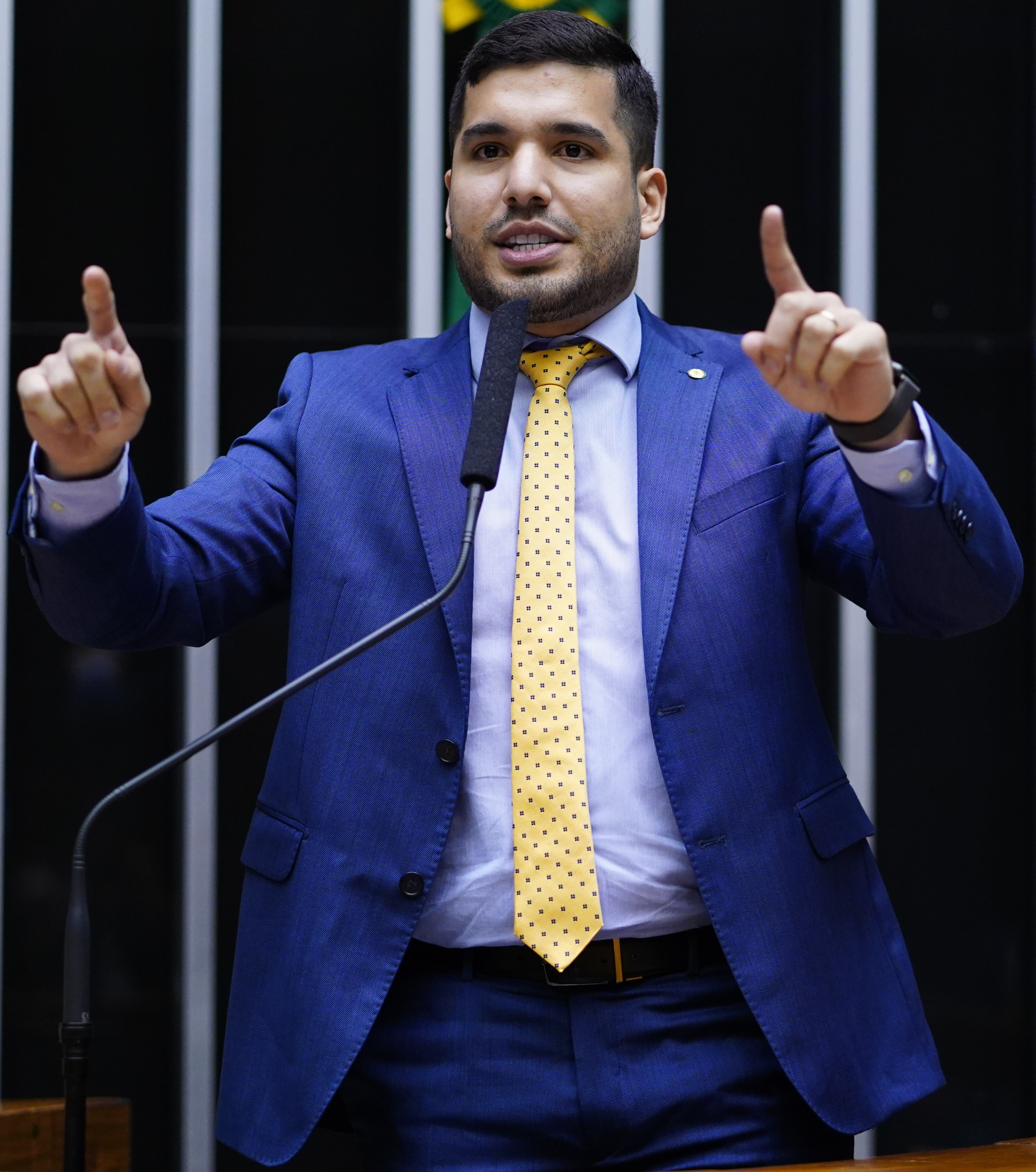
Federal Deputy
André Fernandes (PL)
from Iguatu

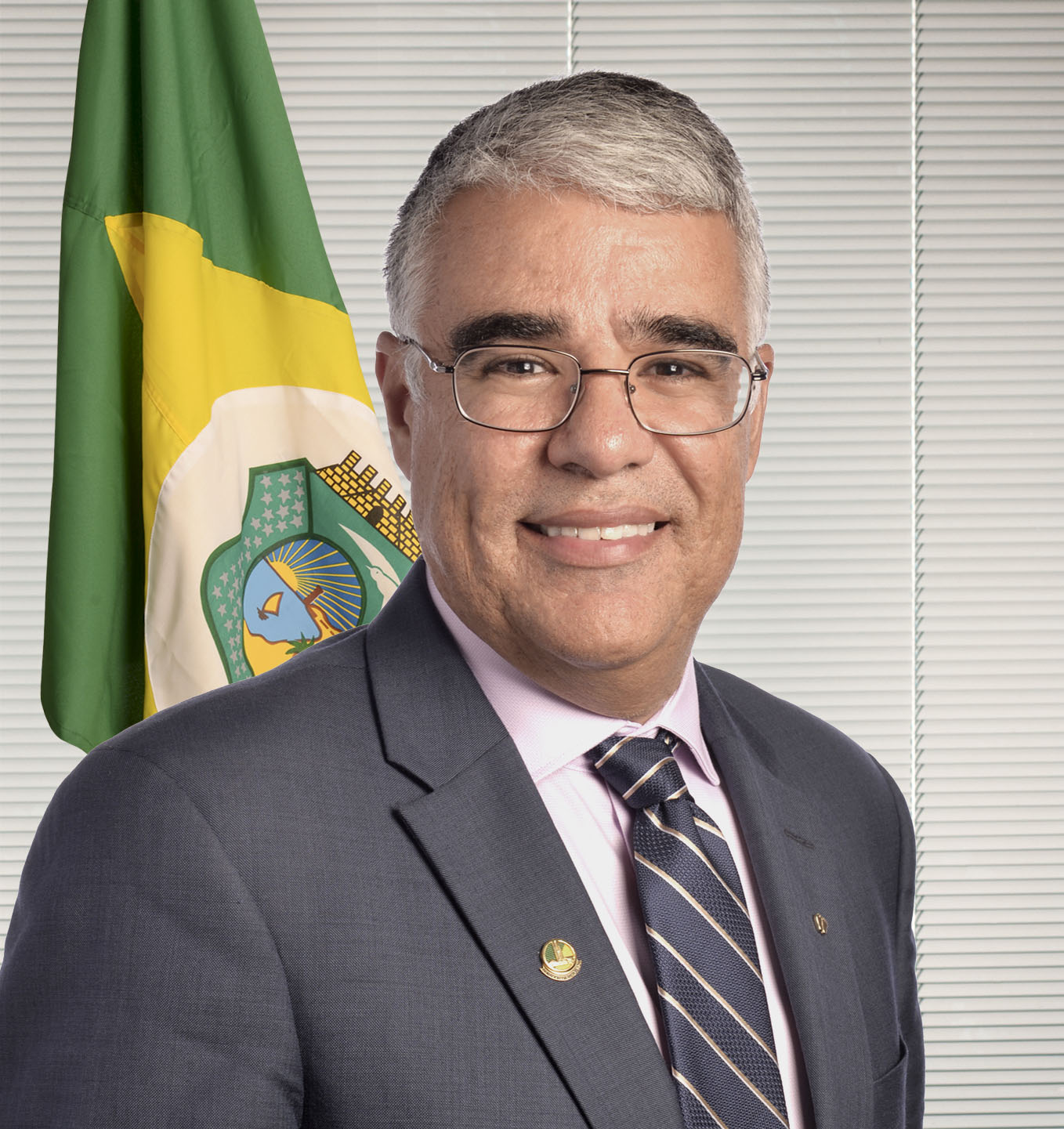
Senator
Eduardo Girão (NOVO)
from Fortaleza

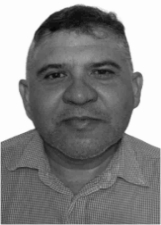
Union organizer
Zé Batista (PSTU)
from Iguatu

=== Withdrawn candidates ===
Sustainability Network (REDE)

- Cindy Carvalho – Environmentalist. The PSOL REDE Federation entered into an agreement and nominated her as the running mate of Técio Nunes.

== Outgoing Municipal Chamber ==
The result of the last municipal election and the current situation in the Municipal Chamber is given below:

Affiliation	Members		+/–
Affiliation	Elected	Current (Note: Between March and April 2024, councilors were able to change parties during the so-called "party window" without losing their respective terms.)	+/–
PDT	10	12	▲2
PSD	2	7	▲5
Avante	0	5	▲5
PT	3	3	Steady
PSDB	1	2	▲1
PSOL	2	2	Steady
PL	2	2	Steady
PSB	3	2	▼1
Agir	0	1	▲1
MOBILIZA	0	1	▲1
Solidarity	0	1	▲1
PRD	didn't exist	1	▲1
UNIÃO	didn't exist	1	▲1
DEMOCRATA	2	1	▼1
Republicanos	2	1	▼1
Cidadania	3	1	▼2
PODE	1	0	▼1
REDE	1	0	▼1
DEM	1	extinct party (Note: Democrats (DEM) and the Social Liberal Party (PSL) merged into the Brazil Union in February 2022.)	▼1
PSL	1	extinct party (Note: Democrats (DEM) and the Social Liberal Party (PSL) merged into the Brazil Union in February 2022.)	▼1
PP	2	0	▼2
PSC	2	extinct party (Note: The Social Christian Party (PSC) merged into Podemos in June 2023.)	▼2
PROS	5	extinct party (Note: The Republican Party of the Social Order (PROS) merged into Solidariedade in February 2023.)	▼5
Total	43		

== Opinion polls ==
=== First round ===
2024

Pollster/client(s)	Date(s) conducted	Sample size	Wagner UNIÃO	Sarto PDT	Fernandes PL	Leitão PT	Girão NOVO	Batista PSTU	Técio PSOL	Others	Abst. Undec.	Lead
Quaest	19–21 August	900	31%	22%	14%	14%	3%	1%	1%	1% (Note: Chico Malta (PCB) with 1% and George Lima (Solidarity) with 0%, not reach.)	13%	9%
Paraná Pesquisas	16–19 August	800	31.3%	20.1%	16.4%	10%	4.8%	0.6%	0.5%	0.4% (Note: Chico Malta (PCB) with 0.3% and George Lima (Solidarity) with 0.1%)	15.9%	11.2%
Paraná Pesquisas	12–15 July	800	33%	18.3%	15.1%	9.4%	5.5%	0.9%	0.4%	—N/a	17.5%	14.7%
Veritá	1–4 July	1,220	22.7%	15%	27.5%	18.4%	3.5%	0.3%	1.8%	—N/a	10.9%	4.8%
Instituto Ideia	25–30 June	1,000	31%	22%	13%	12%	5%	1%	0.3%	5.2% (Note: Célio Studart (PSD) with 5% and Haroldo Neto (UP) with 0.2%)	11%	9%
Datafolha	24–26 June	644	33%	16%	12%	9%	5%	—N/a	—N/a	8% (Note: Célio Studart (PSD))	16%	17%
Datafolha	24–26 June	644	32%	19%	14%	8%	7%	—N/a	—N/a	—N/a	18%	13%
Simplex/CBN	30 May–2 June	1,067	22%	16.2%	17.3%	8.6%	5.2%	0.5%	—N/a	—N/a	29.1%	4.7%
Paraná Pesquisas	26–30 May	800	33.1%	18.1%	15.9%	8.9%	6%	0.6%	0.4%	—N/a	17%	15%
Duda Pesquisa	24–30 May	1,000	32%	16%	6%	6%	5%	1%	0%	6% (Note: Célio Studart (PSD))	28%	16%
7 April		Evandro Leitão obtains the support of the majority of Workers' Party delegates to be the party's nominee for mayor.										
Pollster/client(s)	Date(s) conducted	Sample size	Wagner UNIÃO	Sarto PDT	Leitão PT	Luizianne PT	Fernandes PL	Técio PSOL	Girão NOVO	Others	Abst. Undec.	Lead
Paraná Pesquisas	22–27 March	800	33.3%	20.1%	8.3%	—N/a	12.1%	0.8%	4.6%	0.8% (Note: Zé Batista (PSTU)'s polling intention.)	20.2%	13.2%
Paraná Pesquisas	22–27 March	800	30%	17%	—N/a	21.3%	12.1%	0.5%	4.5%	0.1% (Note: Zé Batista (PSTU)'s polling intention.)	14.5%	8.7%
Paraná Pesquisas	22–27 March	800	34.8%	20.3%	9.9%	—N/a	13.3%	0.8%	—N/a	0.9% (Note: Zé Batista (PSTU)'s polling intention.)	20.3%	14.5%
24 February		Técio Nunes is announced as a potential candidate by the Socialism and Liberty Party (PSOL).										
Pollster/client(s)	Date(s) conducted	Sample size	Wagner UNIÃO	Sarto PDT	Leitão PT	Luizianne PT	Fernandes PL	Monteiro PSOL	Girão NOVO	Others	Abst. Undec.	Lead
Paraná Pesquisas	11–16 January	800	38.5%	21.8%	6.5%	—N/a	9.1%	1%	5.3%	1.4% (Note: Zé Batista (PSTU) with 0.8% and Chico Malta (PCB) with 0.6%)	16.6%	16.7%
Paraná Pesquisas	11–16 January	800	35.6%	17.5%	—N/a	20.8%	9.3%	0.5%	4.8%	0.7% (Note: Chico Malta (PCB) with 0.4% and Zé Batista (PSTU) with 0.3%)	11%	14.8%
Paraná Pesquisas	11–16 January	800	33.4%	—N/a	6.4%	—N/a	8%	0.8%	3.5%	33.8% (Note: Roberto Cláudio (PDT) with 32.4%; Chico Malta (PCB) with 0.8% and Zé Batista (PSTU) with 0.6%)	14.3%	1%
Paraná Pesquisas	11–16 January	800	31.9%	—N/a	—N/a	18.4%	8.3%	0.3%	3.4%	28% (Note: Roberto Cláudio (PDT) with 27%; Chico Malta (PCB) with 0.5% and Zé Batista (PSTU) with 0.5%)	9.9%	4.9%
Paraná Pesquisas	11–16 January	800	43.9%	19.3%	—N/a	22.3%	—N/a	—N/a	—N/a	—N/a	14.6%	21.6%
Paraná Pesquisas	11–16 January	800	—N/a	26.1%	—N/a	27.1%	19.9%	—N/a	—N/a	—N/a	26.9%	1%
Paraná Pesquisas	11–16 January	800	46.5%	24.3%	8.5%	—N/a	—N/a	—N/a	—N/a	—N/a	20.8%	22.2%
Paraná Pesquisas	11–16 January	800	—N/a	33%	11.5%	—N/a	20.6%	—N/a	—N/a	—N/a	34.9%	12.4%

2023

Pollster/client(s)	Date(s) conducted	Sample size	Wagner UNIÃO	Sarto PDT	Luizianne PT	Leitão PT	Fernandes PL	Studart PSD	Girão NOVO	Izolda Ind.	Others	Abst. Undec.	Lead
Atlas Intel	25–30 December	800	28.6%	25.6%	—N/a	14.2%	12.9%	1.9%	1.5%	—N/a	—N/a	15.3%	3%
Atlas Intel	25–30 December	800	25.2%	26%	15.3%	—N/a	14.1%	4.3%	1.6%	—N/a	—N/a	13.4%	0.8%
17 December			Evandro Leitão joins the Workers' Party (PT).										
Pollster/client(s)	Date(s) conducted	Sample size	Wagner UNIÃO	Roberto PDT	Luizianne PT	Sarto PDT	Izolda Ind.	Leitão Ind.	Fernandes PL	Studart PSD	Others	Abst. Undec.	Lead
RealTime Big Data	24–25 August	1,000	32%	—N/a	20%	16%	—N/a	9%	—N/a	—N/a	6% (Note: Carmelo Neto (PL))	17%	12%
RealTime Big Data	24–25 August	1,000	33%	—N/a	21%	21%	—N/a	—N/a	—N/a	—N/a	6%	19%	12%
RealTime Big Data	24–25 August	1,000	32%	—N/a	—N/a	22%	—N/a	15%	—N/a	—N/a	6%	25%	10%
RealTime Big Data	24–25 August	1,000	30%	24%	17%	—N/a	—N/a	7%	4%	—N/a	4% (Note: Carmelo Neto (PL))	14%	6%
August			Evandro Leitão decides to leave the Democratic Labour Party (PDT).										
Pollster/client(s)	Date(s) conducted	Sample size	Wagner UNIÃO	Roberto PDT	Luizianne PT	Sarto PDT	Izolda Ind.	Leitão PDT	Fernandes PL	Studart PSD	Others	Abst. Undec.	Lead
RealTime Big Data	2–3 June	1,000	34%	—N/a	23%	14%	—N/a	8%	3%	3%	—N/a	15%	11%
RealTime Big Data	2–3 June	1,000	31%	25%	19%	—N/a	—N/a	6%	3%	2%	—N/a	14%	6%
RealTime Big Data	2–3 June	1,000	34%	—N/a	20%	12%	12%	—N/a	3%	3%	—N/a	16%	14%
RealTime Big Data	2–3 June	1,000	34%	—N/a	19%	15%	—N/a	—N/a	3%	4%	3% (Note: Onélia Santana (wife of former governor Camilo Santana))	15%	15%
RealTime Big Data	2–3 June	1,000	36%	—N/a	—N/a	20%	—N/a	13%	3%	5%	—N/a	23%	16%
RealTime Big Data	2–3 June	1,000	31%	22%	15%	—N/a	12%	—N/a	3%	2%	—N/a	14%	9%
RealTime Big Data	2–3 June	1,000	31%	27%	20%	—N/a	—N/a	—N/a	3%	3%	2% (Note: Onélia Santana (wife of former governor Camilo Santana))	14%	4%
Paraná Pesquisas	20–23 April	742	38.1%	—N/a	26.5%	13.9%	—N/a	—N/a	3.1%	—N/a	2.3% (Note: Adelita Monteiro (PSOL) with 0.8%; Chico Malta (PCB) with 0.8% and Zé Batista (PSTU) with 0.7%)	16.1%	11.6%
Paraná Pesquisas	20–23 April	742	42%	—N/a	—N/a	18.9%	—N/a	6.7%	—N/a	—N/a	9.6% (Note: Priscila Costa (PL) with 5,3%; Gabriel Biologia (PSOL) with 2%; Chico Malta (PCB) with 1.6% and Zé Batista (PSTU) with 0.7%)	22.8%	23.1%

=== Second round ===
Capitão Wagner and José Sarto

Pollster/client(s)	Date(s) conducted	Sample size	Sarto PDT	Wagner UNIÃO	Abst. Undec.	Lead
Atlas Intel	25–30 December 2023	800	42.2%	42.1%	15.7%	0.1%

Capitão Wagner and Evandro Leitão

Pollster/client(s)	Date(s) conducted	Sample size	Wagner UNIÃO	Leitão PT	Abst. Undec.	Lead
Atlas Intel	25–30 December 2023	800	40.5%	33.6%	25.9%	6.9%

José Sarto and André Fernandes

Pollster/client(s)	Date(s) conducted	Sample size	Sarto PDT	Fernandes PL	Abst. Undec.	Lead
Atlas Intel	25–30 December 2023	800	39.7%	30.3%	30%	9.4%

Hypothetical scenario with Luizianne Lins

Capitão Wagner and Luizianne Lins (eliminated in party primaries)

Pollster/client(s)	Date(s) conducted	Sample size	Wagner UNIÃO	Luizianne PT	Abst. Undec.	Lead
Atlas Intel	25–30 December 2023	800	46.1%	34.9%	19%	11.2%

=== Rejection of candidates ===
In some opinion polls, the interviewee can choose more than one alternative (the so-called "multiple rejection"), therefore, the sum of the percentages of all candidates can exceed 100% of the votes in some scenarios.

Pollster/client(s)	Date(s) conducted	Sample size	Sarto PDT	Wagner UNIÃO	Fernandes PL	Leitão PT	Girão NOVO	Batista PSTU	Técio PSOL	Studart PSD	Could vote in anyone	Others	Abst. Undec.
Quaest	19–21 August 2024	900	43%	37%	26%	32%	39%	10%	14%	—N/a	?	27% (Note: Chico Malta (PCB) with rejection of 16% and George Lima (Solidarity) with 11%.)	9%
Paraná Pesquisas	16–19 August 2024	800	33.9%	23.9%	17.6%	19.6%	13%	10.4%	9.3%	—N/a	4.9%	10% (Note: Chico Malta (PCB) with 5.5% and George Lima (Solidarity) with 4.5%)	10.6%
Paraná Pesquisas	12–15 July 2024	800	36.4%	25.6%	19.1%	20.6%	16%	12.1%	11.6%	—N/a	7.9%	—N/a	17.3%
Veritá	1–4 July 2024	1,220	14.9%	—N/a	27.8%	34.4%	—N/a	—N/a	—N/a	—N/a	—N/a	—N/a	—N/a
Paraná Pesquisas	26–30 May 2024	800	38.9%	24.9%	21.5%	21.4%	17.3%	14.1%	11.5%	—N/a	4.8%	—N/a	7%
Duda Pesquisa	24–30 May 2024	1,000	22%	18%	10%	7%	7%	8%	5%	5%	4%	—N/a	8%
7 April 2024		Evandro Leitão obtains the support of the majority of Workers' Party delegates to be the party's nominee for mayor.											
Pollster/client(s)	Date(s) conducted	Sample size	Luizianne PT	Wagner UNIÃO	Sarto PDT	Fernandes PL	Girão NOVO	Leitão PT	Batista PSTU	Técio PSOL	Could vote in anyone	Others	Abst. Undec.
Paraná Pesquisas	22–27 March 2024	800	32.8%	26.5%	25.9%	15.4%	11.4%	10.9%	10.6%	9.4%	2%	—N/a	12.6%
24 February 2024		Técio Nunes is announced as a potential candidate by the Socialism and Liberty Party (PSOL).											
Pollster/client(s)	Date(s) conducted	Sample size	Luizianne PT	Wagner UNIÃO	Sarto PDT	Fernandes PL	Girão NOVO	Leitão PT	Batista PSTU	Monteiro PSOL	Could vote in anyone	Others	Abst. Undec.
Paraná Pesquisas	11–16 January 2024	800	30.6%	26.9%	23%	16.9%	9.8%	11.1%	9.5%	8.8%	4.8%	25% (Note: Roberto Cláudio (PDT) with 14.1% and Chico Malta (PCB) with 10.9%)	19%

== Results ==
=== Mayor ===
Candidate	Running mate	Party	First round		Second round	
Candidate	Running mate	Party	Votes	%	Votes	%
Evandro Leitão	Gabriella Aguiar (PSD)	Workers' Party	480,174	34.36	716,133	50.38
André Fernandes	Alcyvania Pinheiro	Liberal Party	562,305	40.24	705,295	49.62
José Sarto (incumbent)	Élcio Batista (PSDB)	Democratic Labour Party	164,402	11.76		
Capitão Wagner	Edilene Santos	Brazil Union	159,426	11.41		
Eduardo Girão	Silvana Bezerra	New Party	14,878	1.06		
Tecio Nunes	Cindy Carvalho (REDE)	Socialism and Liberty Party	8,923	0.64		
George Lima	Rachel Girão	Solidariedade	6,803	0.49		
Chico Malta	Roberto dos Santos	Brazilian Communist Party	1,205			
José Batista Neto	Maria de Lourdes Gonçalves	United Socialist Workers' Party	615	0.04		
Total			1,397,526	100.00	1,421,428	100.00
Valid votes			1,397,526	93.48	1,421,428	95.44
Invalid votes			58,208	3.89	43,509	2.92
Blank votes			39,328	2.63	24,415	1.64
Total votes			1,495,062	100.00	1,489,352	100.00
Registered voters/turnout			1,769,681	84.48	1,769,681	84.16
PT gain from PDT						

=== Municipal Chamber ===
Party or alliance		Votes	%	Seats	+/–
Democratic Labour Party		214,581	15.59	8	▼2
Liberal Party		147,395	10.71	5	▲3
Social Democratic Party		120,926	8.79	4	▲2
Democratic Renewal Party		108,792	7.90	3	New
Brazil of Hope	Workers' Party	95,697	6.95	4	▲1
Brazil of Hope	Green Party	19,167	1.39	0	Steady
Brazil of Hope	Communist Party of Brazil	9,179	0.67	0	Steady
Avante		86,434	6.28	3	▲3
Brazil Union		70,042	5.09	2	New
Progressistas		69,614	5.06	2	Steady
PSOL REDE; Federation	Socialism and Liberty Party	56,933	4.14	2	Steady
PSOL REDE; Federation	Sustainability Network	566	0.04	0	▼1
Podemos		55,661	4.04	1	Steady
Brazilian Socialist Party		55,032	4.00	2	▲2
Republicans		52,967	3.85	2	Steady
Agir		39,792	2.89	1	▲1
Christian Democracy		37,869	2.75	1	▲1
National Mobilization		33,863	2.46	1	▲1
PSDB Cidadania; Federation	Brazilian Social Democracy Party	32,498	2.36	1	Steady
PSDB Cidadania; Federation	Cidadania	22,524	1.64	1	▼2
Brazilian Democratic Movement		30,571	2.22	0	Steady
New Party		15,819	1.15	0	Steady
United Socialist Workers' Party		318	0.02	0	Steady
Popular Unity		94	0.01	0	Steady
Total		1,376,334	100.00	43	–
Valid votes		1,376,334	92.06		
Invalid votes		59,546	3.98		
Blank votes		59,182	3.96		
Total votes		1,495,062	100.00		
Registered voters/turnout		1,769,681	84.48		
