= Ronaldo Martins =

Brazilian politician (born 1978)

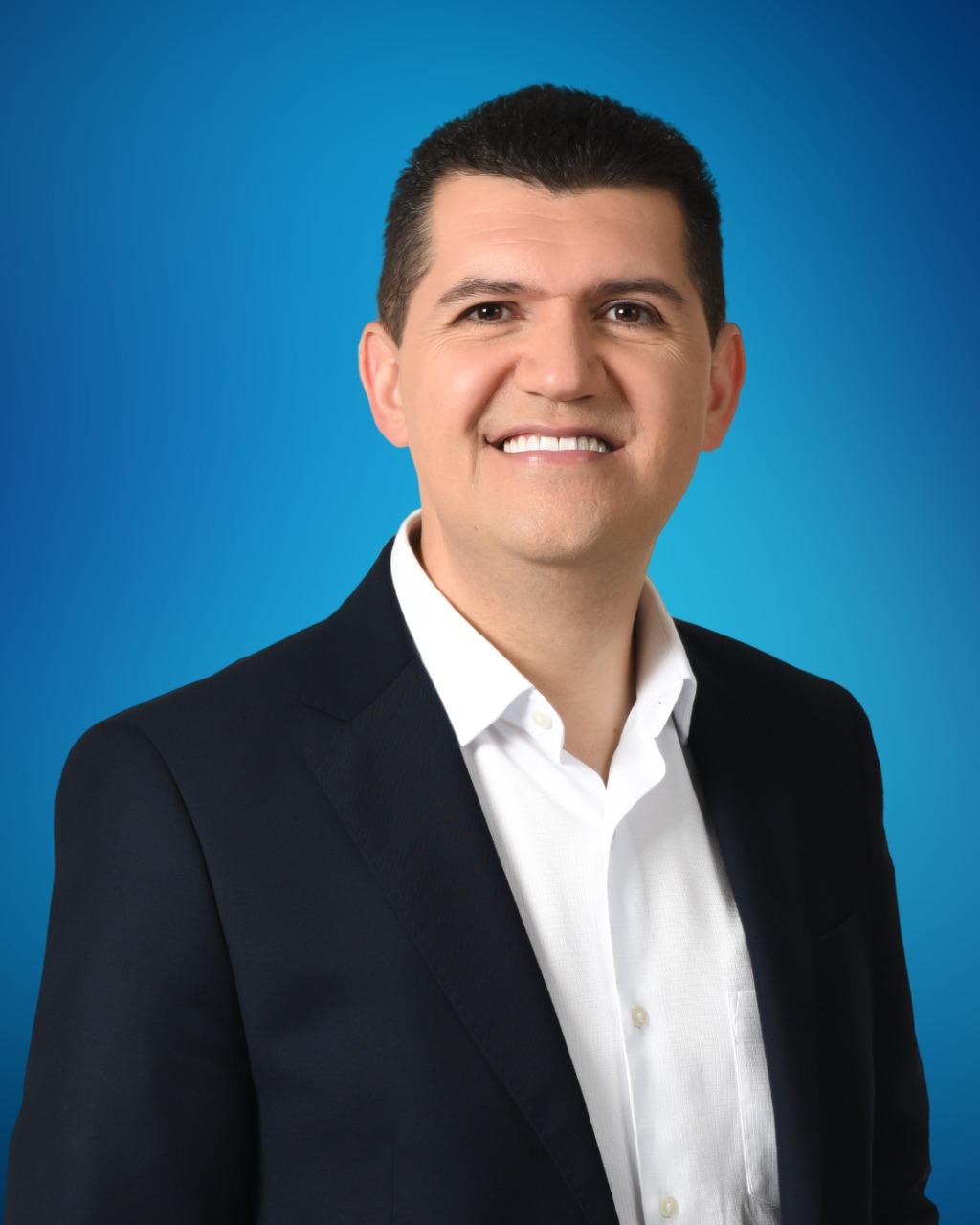
- Martins in 2021

Member of the Chamber of Deputies
- In office 3 August 2022 – 2 December 2022
- Preceded by: Moses Rodrigues
- Succeeded by: Moses Rodrigues
- Constituency: Ceará
- In office 12 August 2020 – 13 December 2020
- Preceded by: Domingos Neto
- Succeeded by: Domingos Neto
- Constituency: Ceará
- In office 9 October 2019 – 8 February 2020
- Preceded by: Moses Rodrigues
- Succeeded by: Moses Rodrigues
- Constituency: Ceará
- In office 1 February 2015 – 31 January 2019
- Constituency: Ceará

Personal details
- Born: 21 January 1978 (age 48)
- Party: Republicans (since 2019)

Ronaldo Manchado Martins (born 21 January 1978) is a Brazilian politician. He was a member of the Chamber of Deputies from 2015 to 2019, from 2019 to 2020, from August to December 2020, and from August to December 2022. From 2003 to 2015, he was a member of the Legislative Assembly of Ceará.
