= José Sarto =

Brazilian physician and politician

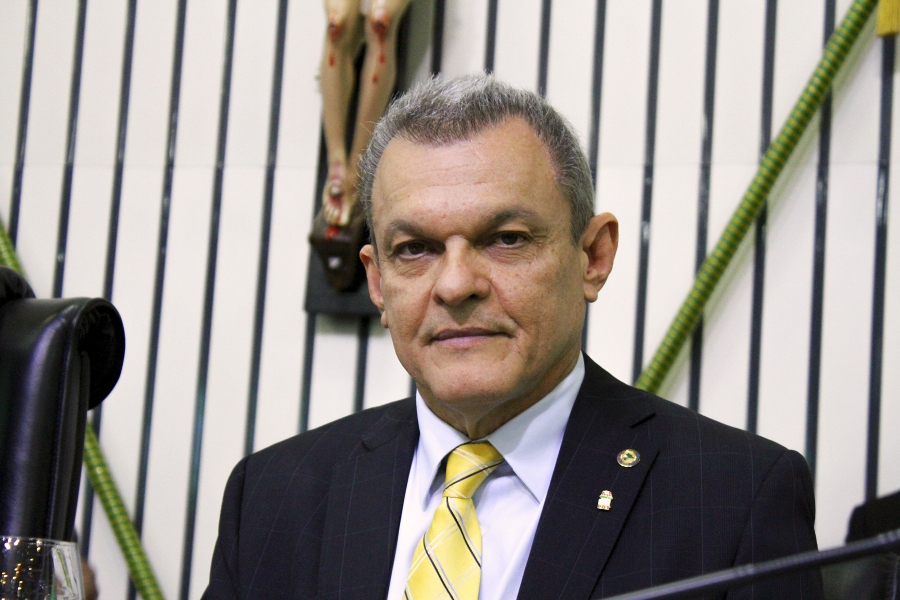

96th Mayor of Fortaleza
- In office 1 January 2021 – 31 December 2024
- Vice Mayor: Élcio Batista
- Preceded by: Roberto Cláudio
- Succeeded by: Evandro Leitão

President of the Legislative Assembly of Ceará
- In office 1 February 2019 – 31 December 2020
- Vice President: Fernando Santana (2019–2020)
- Preceded by: Zezinho Albuquerque
- Succeeded by: Fernando Santana (interim)

Vice President of the Legislative Assembly of Ceará
- In office 10 February 2011 – 28 December 2012
- President: Roberto Cláudio

Member of the Legislative Assembly of Ceará
- In office 1 February 1995 – 31 December 2020
- Constituency: At-large

President of the Municipal Chamber of Fortaleza
- In office 1990–1992
- Succeeded by: Átila Bezerra

Councillor of Fortaleza
- In office 1 January 1989 – 31 December 1994
- Constituency: At-large

Personal details
- Born: February 13, 1959 (age 67) Acopiara, Ceará
- Party: PDT (2016–present)
- Other political affiliations: PROS (2013–2016); PSB (2005–2013); PPS (1999–2005); PMDB (1992–1999); PDC (1985–1992)
- Spouse: Natália Herculano (div. 2021)
- Children: 3
- Education: Federal University of Ceará

José Sarto Nogueira Moreira (born 13 February 1959) is a physician and a Brazilian politician affiliated to the Democratic Labour Party (PDT). He has been the former mayor of Fortaleza, the capital city of Ceará since 2021.

== Early life ==
José Sarto was born in Acopiara, a municipality located in the center-south of the state of Ceará, and is the son of Antônio Moreira de Oliveira and Maria Alice Nogueira de Oliveira. He moved at the age of one to Fortaleza, where he studied in a municipal public school. He studied and graduated in medicine at the Federal University of Ceará, and worked as an intern in the areas of gynecology and obstetrics at Jackson Memorial Hospital, in Miami, Florida. Sarto also enrolled in the Master's course in political science at the Higher Institute of Social and Political Sciences, owned by the University of Lisbon, in Portugal.

== Political career ==
Sarto began his political career by joining the Christian Democratic Party (PDC) in 1985. He entered the public life and ran for a seat of councillor in the Municipal Chamber of Fortaleza in the 1988 Fortaleza city election. He was elected with 2,604 votes. After his election as councillor of Fortaleza, he was elected president of the Municipal Chamber of Fortaleza from 1990 to 1992. Sarto left the Christian Democratic Party in 1992 and joined the Brazilian Democratic Movement Party (PMDB) in the same year. He ran for a second term in 1992 and was re-elected with 3,462 votes.

=== Legislative Assembly of Ceará ===
In the 1994 Ceará state election, Sarto ran for a seat at the Legislative Assembly of Ceará and was elected for his first term as a state deputy with 29,301 votes. In the 1998 Ceará state elections, he wasn't re-elected for a second term, only obtaining 29,669 votes and becoming the first alternate of his party. However, Sarto took office for a second term after the appointment of the state deputy Mauro Benevides Filho as a Secretary of Administration of the State of Ceará. The same situation happened in the 2002 Ceará state elections; Sarto only obtained 24,766 votes and became an alternate on his party. Sarto finally took office for a third term of state deputy after the appointment of the state deputy Francisco Aguiar for the Council of the Court of Auditors of the Municipalities of the State of Ceará.

After these two elections, he was re-elected for a fourth term in the 2006 Ceará state elections with 58,013 votes; for a fifth term in the 2010 Ceará state elections with 65,284 votes and for a sixth term in the 2014 Ceará state elections with 85,310 votes (obtaining his best electoral result so far). He ran for a seventh term in the 2018 Ceará state elections, obtaining 68,937 votes.

During his terms in office as a state deputy, he was leader of the government of Cid Gomes and a deputy leader of the government of the former governor Camilo Santana. In the 2011/2012 biennium, Sarto was part of the Bureau of the Legislative Assembly and became the 1st Vice President of the house, serving as an Interim President in January 2013, after his predecessor Roberto Cláudio was elected as the mayor of Fortaleza in the 2012 Fortaleza mayoral election. On 1 February 2019, he was elected as the president of the Legislative Assembly of Ceará with votes from 45 of the 46 state deputies for the 2019/2020 biennium.

=== Mayor of Fortaleza (2021–present) ===
On 10 September 2020, the Democratic Labour Party of Ceará, through virtual debates, nominated Sarto as a mayoral candidate in the 2020 Fortaleza mayoral election, in order to succeed the former mayor Roberto Cláudio, also a member of the party. Élcio Batista, a member of the Brazilian Socialist Party (PSB) and the former chief of staff of the former governor Camilo Santana (PT), was chosen as his running mate in the ticket.

The convention that made his candidacy official took place two days later. The Democratic Labour Party, the Brazilian Socialist Party and ten other parties formed the Fortaleza Getting Better (Fortaleza Cada Vez Melhor) coalition. At the end of the first round of the election, on 15 November 2020, Sarto obtained 35.73% of the valid votes (equivalent to 457,622 voters) against 33.32% of the federal deputy Capitão Wagner (426,803 voters), with whom he contested the second round.

On 29 November 2020, after the second round of elections, Sarto obtained around 51.69% of the votes (668,652 voters) against Wagner's 48.31% (624,892 voters), being elected as the next mayor of Fortaleza.

=== 2024 Fortaleza mayoral election ===
About two years before the 2024 elections, Sarto stated that he could run for re-election as long as it was a Democratic Labour Party's decision. Throughout 2023, his candidacy for re-election was taken for granted by political figures of the party such as the former mayor Roberto Cláudio, the interim national president of the party André Figueiredo and the former governor of Ceará Ciro Gomes.

== Personal life ==
Sarto was married for fourteen years to nurse Natália Herculano, divorcing her in 2021. They have one son.
