= Nestor Bezerra =

Brazilian politician

Nestor Bezzera (born 15 September 1967) is a Brazilian bricklayer and politician. He was state deputy of Ceará by the Socialism and Liberty Party (PSOL) between 22 February and 22 June 2019, replacing Renato Roseno (PSOL) during 120 days.

Bezzera was the second bricklayer to take office in the Legislative Assembly of Ceará, 71 years after José Marinho de Vasconcelos (PCB).

He ran unsuccessfully for alderman of Fortaleza by PSTU in 2016.
