= Fernando Santana (politician) =

Brazilian politician (born 1981)

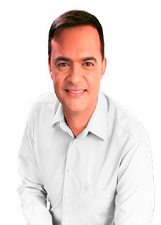
- Santana in 2024

Member-elect of the Chamber of Deputies
- Assuming office 1 February 2027

Member of the Legislative Assembly of Ceará
- Incumbent
- Assumed office 1 February 2019
- Constituency: At-large

Interim President of the Legislative Assembly of Ceará
- In office 1 January 2025 – 1 February 2025
- Preceded by: Evandro Leitão
- Succeeded by: Romeu Aldigueri
- In office 1 January 2021 – 1 February 2021
- Preceded by: José Sarto
- Succeeded by: Evandro Leitão

Personal details
- Born: Fernando Matos Santana; 5 January 1981 (age 45) Juazeiro do Norte, Ceará, Brazil
- Party: PT (since 2018)

Fernando Matos Santana (born 5 January 1981) is a Brazilian politician serving as secretary of water resources of Ceará since 2025. He has been a member of the Legislative Assembly of Ceará since 2019.

Political offices
Preceded by José Sarto	Interim President of the Legislative Assembly of Ceará; 2021	Succeeded by Evandro Leitão
Preceded by Evandro Leitão	Interim President of the Legislative Assembly of Ceará; 2025	Succeeded by Romeu Aldigueri
