= Moses Filho =

Brazilian politician (born 2001)

Member of the Legislative Assembly of Ceará
- Incumbent
- Assumed office 1 February 2027

Personal details
- Born: 30 August 2001 (age 25)
- Party: Brazil Union
- Parent: Moses Rodrigues (father)
- Relatives: Oscar Rodrigues (grandfather)

Moses Haendel Melo Rodrigues Filho (born 30 August 2001) is a Brazilian politician who was elected member of the Legislative Assembly of Ceará in 2026. He is the son of Moses Rodrigues and the grandson of Oscar Rodrigues.
