= Patrícia Saboya =

Brazilian writer and politician

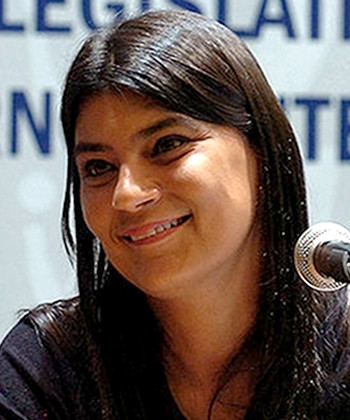
- Saboya in 2007

Member of the Legislative Assembly of Ceará
- In office 1 February 2011 – 1 January 2015

Member of the Brazilian Senate
- In office 1 February 2003 – 1 February 2011
- Preceded by: Sérgio Machado
- Succeeded by: José Barroso Pimentel
- Constituency: Ceará

Member of the Legislative Assembly of Ceará
- In office 1 January 1999 – 31 December 2002

Councilor of Fortaleza
- In office 1 January 1997 – 31 December 1998

First Lady of Ceará
- In office 15 March 1991 – 6 September 1994

Personal details
- Born: Patrícia Lúcia Mendes Saboya; 10 October 1962 (age 63) Sobral, Ceará, Brazil
- Party: PSDB (1990–1997); Cidadania (1997–2005); PSB (2005–2007); PDT (2007–present)
- Spouse: Ciro Gomes (m. 1983; div. 1999)
- Children: 3
- Occupation: Teacher, writer, politician
- Awards: Order of Naval Merit (2005)

Patrícia Lúcia Saboya Ferreira Gomes (née Mendes; born 10 October 1962) is a Brazilian teacher, writer, and politician.

== Biography ==
Patrícia Saboya was born in Sobral, Ceará on 10 October 1962, the third daughter of José Saboia Neto and Maria Marly Mendes Saboia, paternal granddaughter of senator Plínio Pompeu, and great-great-granddaughter of Vicente Alves de Paula Pessoa. She earned a degree in teaching from the University of Fortaleza. From 1983 to 1999, she was married to Ciro Gomes, her political ally and governor of Ceará from 1991 to 1994. They had three children together.

Her first elected position was as councilor of Fortaleza in 1996, standing as a candidate for the Brazilian Social Democracy Party (PSDB) and obtaining 21,839 votes. In 1998, she was elected to the Legislative Assembly of Ceará, now for the Popular Socialist Party (PPS), with 79,739 votes. In 2000, she ran for mayor of Fortaleza, finishing 4th with 17% of the votes.

In 2002, Saboya overcame objections within the PPS and ran for one of two vacancies in the Brazilian Senate. She was elected the first female senator for the State of Ceará, with 1,864,404 votes.

In 2005, she joined the Brazilian Socialist Party (PSB), but changed her affiliation again in September 2007 to the Democratic Labour Party (PDT), where she has remained.

In 2008, she ran again for mayor of Fortaleza, finishing in 3rd place with 15.47% of the votes.

As a senator, Saboya advocated for women's rights, and against the sexual exploitation of minors. She authored a bill to extend the parental leave law to six months.

She coordinated the Parliamentary Front for the Defense of the Rights of Children and Adolescents, was a rapporteur for one of the Subcommittees on Childhood, Adolescence, and Youth, and was president of the Parliamentary Committee of Inquiry on Sexual Exploitation.

In 2009, she took leave from the Senate to receive treatment for health problems, and was replaced by her first substitute, Flávio Torres. She returned to her seat on 16 November 2009.

She was again elected state deputy of Ceará on 3 October 2010, when the PDT received the most votes, with 63,704. On 27 February 2014, the Legislative Assembly elected her advisor to the State Court of Accounts.

== Awards and honors ==
- Order of Naval Merit, 11 June 2005
- 2005–2006 Woman of Struggles and Rights Award from the Instituto Municipalista Nacional
- Apvida Award, Ceará, May 2006
- Neide Castanha Award for the Human Rights of Children and Adolescents, 2011

== Selected publications ==
- Construindo uma nova Perspectiva para Crianças e Adolescentes (2003), Brasilia
- Palavras e Idéias: Compromisso com a Infância e a Adolescência (2003), Brasilia
- Cartilha: Violência Sexual contra Meninos e Meninas (2004). Parliamentary Committee of Inquiry on Sexual Exploitation, Brasilia
- Esperança para as Crianças no Brasil. A CPMI da Exploração Sexual Apresenta seus Resultados (2004), Brasilia
- Protagonismo Social. Reflexões sobre Curso de Capacitação de Lideranças Comunitárias no Ceará (2004), Brasilia
- Infância e Parlamento: guia para formação de Frentes Parlamentares em defesa de crianças e adolescentes (2005), Brasilia
- Manual para Formação e Ação de Frentes Parlamentares em Defesa dos Direitos de Crianças e Adolescentes (2006), in cooperation with the Save the Children Institute of Sweden, Brasilia
- Frente Parlamentar em Defesa dos Direitos de Crianças e Adolescentes, uma Experiência Brasileira (2006), in cooperation with the Save the Children Institute of Sweden, Brasilia
- Os quatro primeiros anos no Senado. Pela infância, pelo Nordeste e por um Brasil melhor (2007), Brasilia
