= Romeu Aldigueri =

Brazilian politician (born 1970)

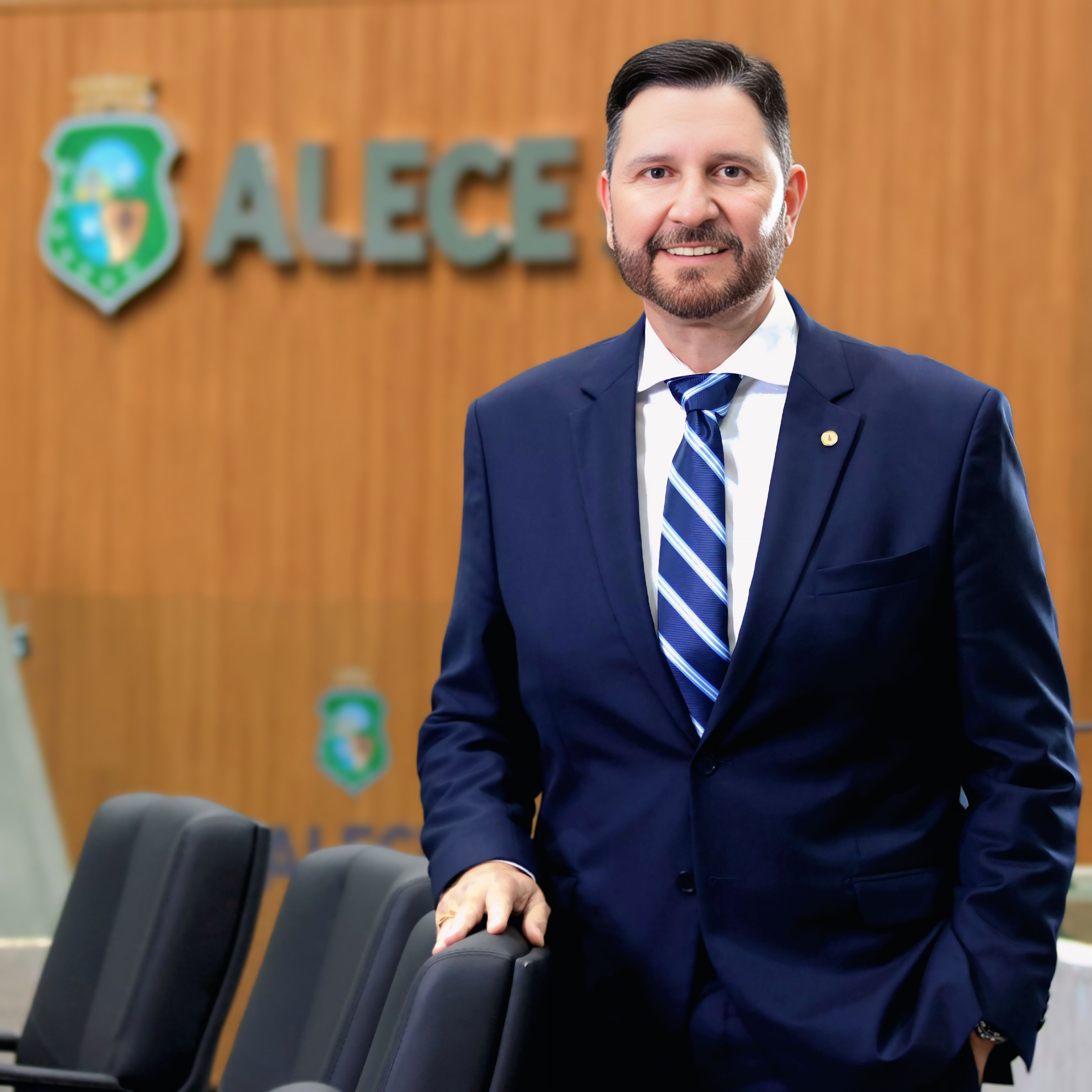
- Aldigueri in 2025

Member of the Legislative Assembly of Ceará
- Incumbent
- Assumed office 1 February 2025
- Preceded by: Fernando Santana (acting); Evandro Leitão

Personal details
- Born: 14 September 1970 (age 56)
- Party: Brazilian Socialist Party
- Spouse: Tainah Marinho

Romeu Aldigueri de Arruda Coelho (born 14 September 1970) is a Brazilian politician serving as a member of the Legislative Assembly of Ceará since 2019. He has served as president of the assembly since 2025. From 2013 to 2016, he served as mayor of Granja.
