= Timeline of Fortaleza =

The following is a timeline of the history of the city of Fortaleza, Ceará, Brazil.

== Prior to 20th century ==
- 1649 - Fortaleza founded by Dutch.
- 1810 - Town becomes capital of Ceará.
- 1823 - Fortaleza attains city status.
- 1846 - Lighthouse fortress built.
- 1854 - Bishopric established.
- 1864 - Seminário Episcopal do Ceará (seminary) founded.
- 1872 - Population: 42,458.
- 1877 - Drought.
- 1887 - Instituto do Ceará (learned society) founded.
- 1890 - Population: 40,902.
- 1894 - Academia Cearense de Letras (literary society) founded.

== 20th century ==
- 1910 - Theatro José de Alencar (theatre) opens.
- 1915 - Drought.
- 1918 - Fortaleza Sporting Club founded.
- 1919 - Colégio Militar de Fortaleza established.
- 1920 - Population: 78,536
- 1928 - O Povo newspaper begins publication.
- 1929 - Ceará Flying Club founded.
- 1932
  - Ceará History Museum established.
  - Drought.
- 1933 - Ferroviário Atlético Clube (football team) formed.
- 1940 - Population: 180,901.
- 1942 - Drought.
- 1946 - Regional Labor Court headquartered in city.
- 1950 - Population: 205,052.
- 1957 - Tribuna do Ceará newspaper begins publication.
- 1960
  - Population: 514,818.
  - City plan presented by Helio Modesto.
- 1962 - Pirambu shantytown rally.
- 1966 - Pinto Martins – Fortaleza International Airport terminal built.
- 1970 - Population: 520,175 city; 828,763 urban agglomeration.
- 1971 - Integrated Development Plan for the Metropolitan Region of Fortaleza presented.
- 1973 - Castelão stadium opens.
- 1974 - Shopping Center Um in business.
- 1979 - Aldeota, Cocó, Meireles, Papicu, and Varjota development begins (approximate date).
- 1980
  - Ceará Museum of Image and Sound established.
  - Population: 1,308,919.
- 1981
  - TV Cidade Fortaleza begins broadcasting.
  - Diário do Nordeste newspaper begins publication.
- 1982
  - Federacao de Bairros y Favelas de Fortaleza (community organization) founded.
  - Iguatemi Fortaleza shopping center in business.
- 1989 - Cocó Park established.
- 1990 - Juraci Vieira de Magalhães becomes mayor.
- 1991
  - Cearah Periferia (housing organization) established.
  - Population: 1,765,794.
- 1992 - Central de Artesanato do Ceará (craft center) built.
- 1993
  - Hospital São Mateus established.
  - Population: 1,846,955 (estimate).
- 1997 - City divided into 7 administrative regions.^{(pt)}
- 1999 - Dragão do Mar Center of Art and Culture inaugurated.

== 21st century ==
- 2005 - Luizianne Lins becomes mayor.
- 2007 - Sobrado of Dr. José Lourenço (building) restored.
- 2010 - Population: 2,452,185.
- 2012
  - Fortaleza Metro begins operating.
  - October: Fortaleza 2012 municipal election held.
- 2013
  - June: Protest.
  - Roberto Cláudio becomes mayor.
- 2014 - July: International 6th BRICS summit held in city.
- 2016 - 2 October: Fortaleza 2016 municipal election held.
- 2019 - 2 June: Dedication of LDS Fortaleza Brazil Temple, 164th in the church.
- 2024 - June : From 10 to 13 June 2024, G20 meeting with participation of over 200 representatives from different parts of the world tried to offer solutions for world scale financial challenges. Among them international organization and multinational banks and financial institutions discussing updating payment environment related to investments and transferring the funds plus other important issues related to the main subject.

== See also ==
- Fortaleza history
- History of Fortaleza
- List of mayors of Fortaleza

== Bibliography ==
=== in English ===
- "Fortaleza" . Encyclopædia Britannica. Vol. 10 (11th ed.). 1910. p. 677.
- Ernst B. Filsinger (1922), "Brazil: Fortaleza", Commercial Travelers' Guide to Latin America, Washington, DC: Government Printing Office
- Yves Cabannes (1997). "From community development to housing finance: from Mutiroes to Casa Melhor in Fortaleza, Brazil". Environment and Urbanization. 9. London: International Institute for Environment and Development. ISBN 978-1-84369-088-7.
- Linda M. P. Gondim and Laurence Hallewell (2004). "Creating the Image of a Modern Fortaleza: Social Inequalities, Political Changes, and the Impact of Urban Design". Latin American Perspectives. 31 (2): 62–79. doi:10.1177/0094582X03261190. JSTOR 3185024. S2CID 144103867.

=== in Portuguese ===
- J.C.R. Milliet de Saint-Adolphe (1863), "Fortaleza", Diccionario geographico, historico e descriptivo, do imperio do Brazil (in Portuguese), Paris: J. P. Aillaud, hdl:2027/wu.89006303085 – via HathiTrust
- Álvaro Gurgel de Alencar, ed. (1903). "Fortaleza". Diccionario geographico historico e descriptivo do Estado do Ceará (in Portuguese). Louis C. Cholowieçki. p. 136+. hdl:2027/uc1.a0002190478 – via HathiTrust.
- Silva, José Borzacchiello da (15 December 2015). "Productive restructuring and reconfiguration of the central area of Fortaleza". Mercator. 14 (3): 75–88. doi:10.4215/RM2015.1403.0005.
