= Bella Carmelo =

Brazilian politician (born 2000)

Member of the Legislative Assembly of Ceará
- Incumbent
- Assumed office 1 February 2027

Personal details
- Born: 7 November 2000 (age 25)
- Party: Liberal Party
- Spouse: Carmelo Neto (m. 2021)

Isabella Antônnia Casale Rocha Carneiro Leão (born 7 November 2000), better known as Bella Carmelo, is a Brazilian politician who was elected member of the Legislative Assembly of Ceará in 2026. She has been a municipal councillor of Fortaleza since 2025. She is married to Carmelo Neto.
