= José Barroso Pimentel =

Brazilian banker and politician

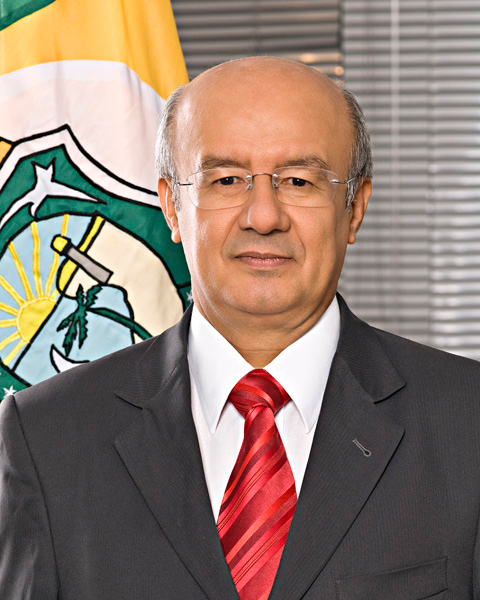

Senator from Ceará
- In office February 1, 2011 – February 1, 2019
- Preceded by: Patrícia Saboya
- Succeeded by: Eduardo Girão

Deputy from Ceará
- In office February 1, 1995 – January 31, 2011

Personal details
- Born: October 16, 1953 (age 73) Picos, Piauí
- Party: Workers' Party
- Profession: Banker

José Barroso Pimentel (born October 16, 1953) is a Brazilian banker and politician. He represented Ceará in the Federal Senate from 2011 to 2019. Previously, he was a deputy from Ceará from 1995 to 2011. He is a member of the Workers' Party.
