= Studart =

Studart is a surname. Notable people with the surname include:

- Célio Studart (born 1987), Brazilian politician
- Heloneida Studart (1932–2007), Brazilian writer and activist
