= Gabriella Aguiar =

Brazilian doctor and politician (born 1990)

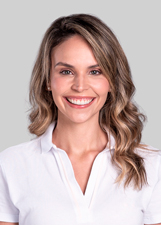

Vice Mayor of Fortaleza
- Incumbent
- Assumed office 1 January 2025
- Mayor: Evandro Leitão
- Preceded by: Élcio Batista

Secretary of Human Rights and Development of Fortaleza
- Incumbent
- Assumed office 1 January 2025

State deputy of Ceará
- In office 1 February 2023 – 27 December 2024

Personal details
- Born: Gabriella Pequeno Costa Gomes de Aguiar; 8 March 1990 (age 36) Fortaleza, Ceará, Brazil
- Party: PSD (2022–present)
- Education: Federal University of Ceará

Gabriella Pequeno Costa Gomes de Aguiar (born 8 March 1990) is a Brazilian medic and politician who is affiliated with the Social Democratic Party (PSD). She is the current vice-mayor, as well as the municipal secretary of Human Rights and Social Development, of Fortaleza.

== Biography ==
Aguiar was born on 8 March 1990 in Fortaleza, the daughter of politicians Domingos Filho and Patrícia Aguiar. She is also the sister of Domingos Neto. Aguiar took secondary school and university courses at Centro Universitário Christus (Unichristus), graduating with a degree in medicine, specializing in geriatrics. She completed her clinical residency at the Hospital Geral de Fortaleza and in the Geriatric Ward at the Hospital das Clínicas da Universidade de São Paulo. She also did a year-long fellowship service in Internal Medicine at Bicêtre Hospital in Paris. She concluded her master's degree at the Medical Sciences-Surgeries faculty of the Federal University of Ceará. She is also a professor of geriatrics at Unichristus and is a member of the clinical body at both Hospital Geral Waldemar de Alcântara and the Hospital Geral de Fortaleza.

== Political career ==
In 2022, she became a candidate to become state deputy in her home state of Ceará for the PSD, being elected with 83,128 votes, being the most voted in 9 municipalities in Ceará. These included, among others, the city of Tauá, where her base of support is, earning 15,149 votes there. Aguiar took office in February the following year. On 30 March 2023, she assumed the presidency of the Escola Superior do Parlamento Cearense (Unipace).

On 29 July 2024, she was confirmed to be the vice-mayoral candidate for the ticket headed by Evandro Leitão of the Worker's Party (PT) . Leitão affirmed that Aguiar would be his vice-mayoral candidate, saying that it was with "great satisfaction" to introduce her and that she has "demonstrated talent and promise, especially in defending women and the elderly." Their candidacy was made official on 3 August, during the party convention. On 2 October, the coalition advanced to the second round with 34.26% of the vote and came in second place. In the second round, the duo won the election with 50.38% of the vote, in a tight race against the ticket led by André Fernandes of the Liberal Party (PL). She took office as vice-mayor on 1 January 2025.
