= Tainah Marinho =

Brazilian politician (born 1996)

Member-elect of the Chamber of Deputies
- Assuming office 1 February 2027
- Constituency: Ceará

Personal details
- Born: Tainah Gomes Marinho Aldigueri Arruda; 9 January 1996 (age 30) Camocim, Ceará, Brazil
- Party: PSB
- Spouse: Romeu Aldigueri
- Profession: Civil engineer

Tainah Gomes Marinho Aldigueri Arruda (born 9 January 1996) is a Brazilian politician who was elected member of the Chamber of Deputies in 2026. She is married to Romeu Aldigueri.
