= Gabriel Biologia =

Brazilian politician (born 1995)

Member of the Legislative Assembly of Ceará
- Incumbent
- Assumed office 1 February 2027

Personal details
- Born: 19 March 1995 (age 31)
- Party: Socialism and Liberty Party

Gabriel Lima de Aguiar (born 19 March 1995), better known as Gabriel Biologia, is a Brazilian politician who was elected member of the Legislative Assembly of Ceará in 2026. He has been a municipal councillor of Fortaleza since 2021.
