= Carmelo Neto =

Brazilian politician (born 2001)

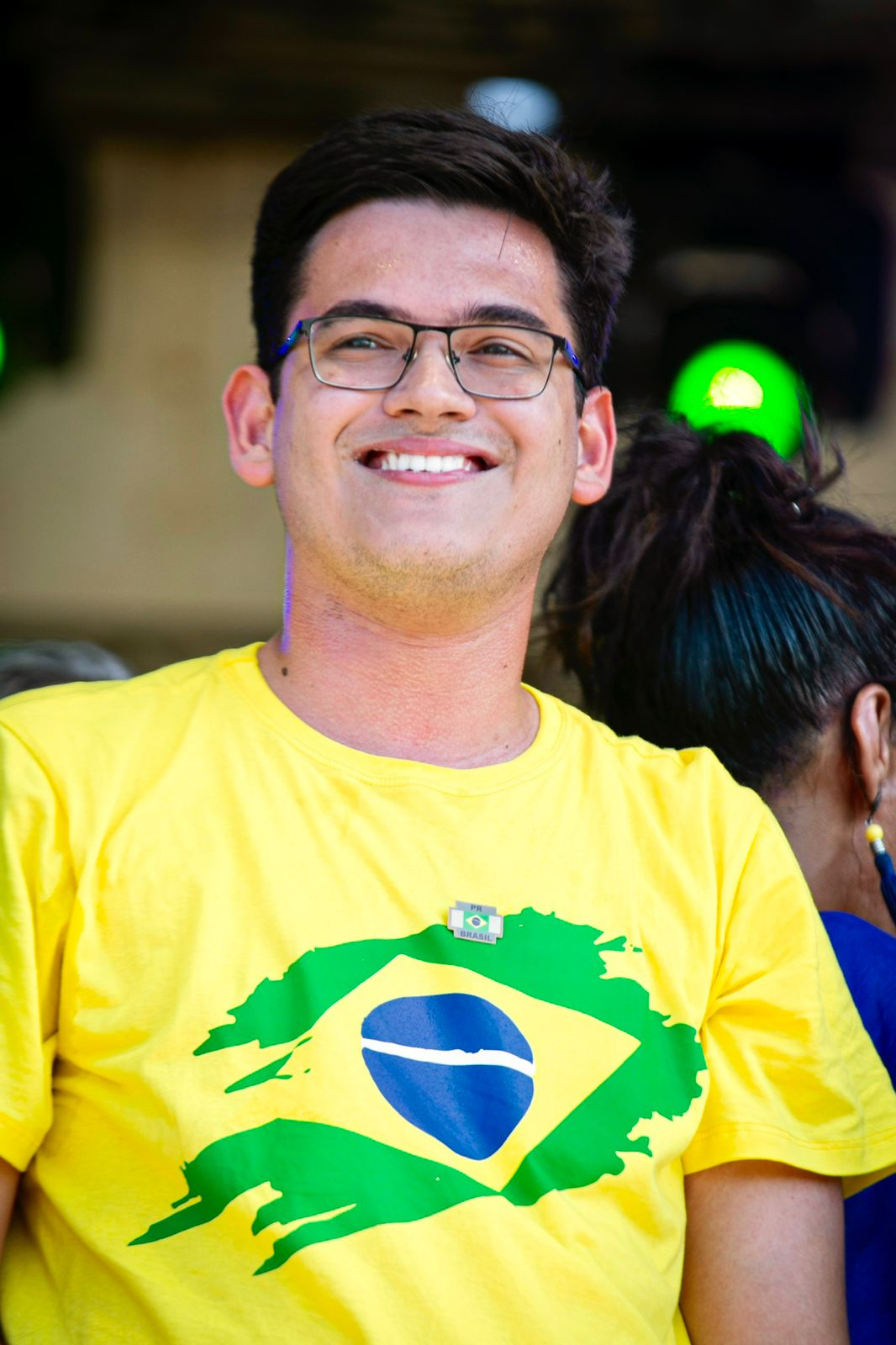
- Neto in 2025

Member-elect of the Chamber of Deputies
- Assuming office 1 February 2027
- Constituency: Ceará

Member of the Legislative Assembly of Ceará
- Incumbent
- Assumed office 1 February 2023
- Constituency: At-large

Member of the Municipal Chamber of Fortaleza
- In office 1 January 2023 – 1 February 2023
- Constituency: At-large

Personal details
- Born: Carmelo Silveira Carneiro Leão Neto; 15 September 2001 (age 25) Fortaleza, Ceará, Brazil
- Party: PL (2022–present)
- Other political affiliations: Republicanos (2020–2022)
- Spouse: Isabella Casale (m. 2021)

Carmelo Silveira Carneiro Leão Neto (born 15 September 2001) is a Brazilian politician serving as a member of the Legislative Assembly of Ceará since 2023. He has served as president of the Liberal Party's youth wing since 2025.
