= Pirambu (Fortaleza) =

Neighborhood in the Brazilian city of Fortaleza

Coordinates: 3.710211°S 38.552752°W

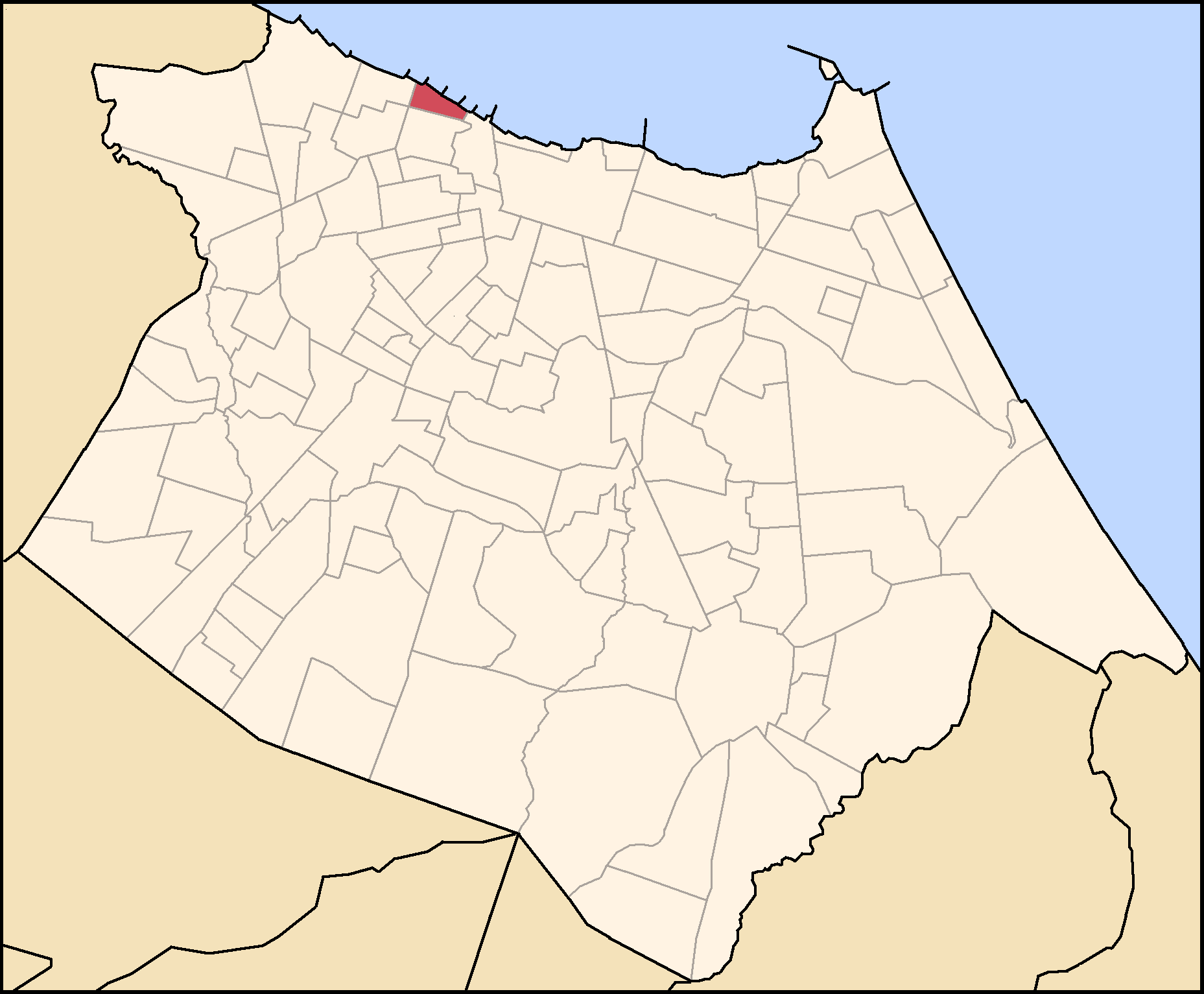
Map of Fortaleza with Pirambu in red

Pirambu is a neighborhood located on the coastal area of the western of Fortaleza, the state capital of Ceará, located in Northeastern Brazil. Some maps refer to this neighborhood covering areas those are beyond the limits configured by Fortaleza city hall, incorporating the neighborhoods of Pirambu and Cristo Redentor, addition to part of another neighborhood called Barra do Ceará. That is because of this area in the past was named Big Pirambu.

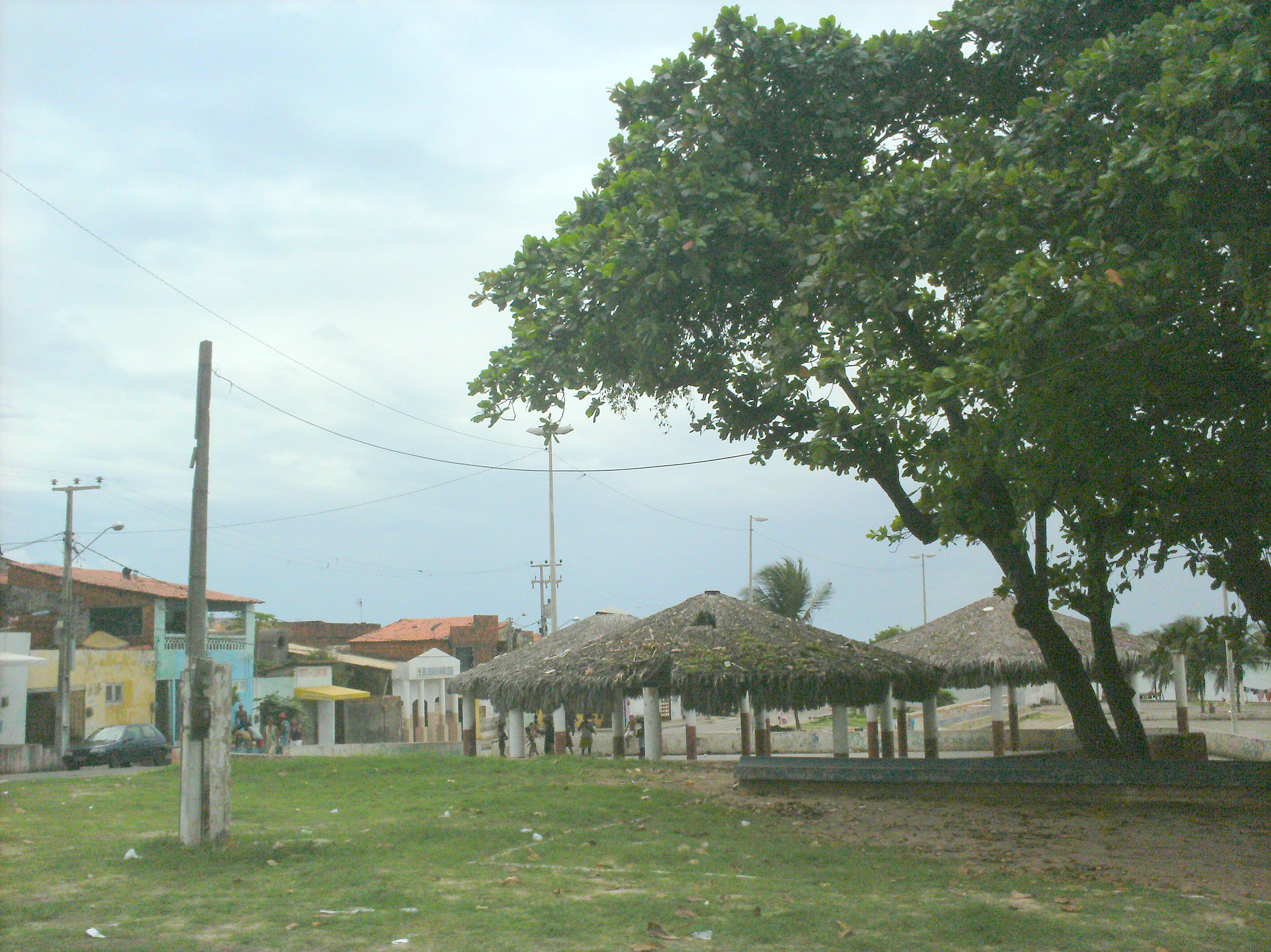
Pirambu
