= Domingos Gomes de Aguiar Neto =

Brazilian politician (born 1988)

Domingos Neto
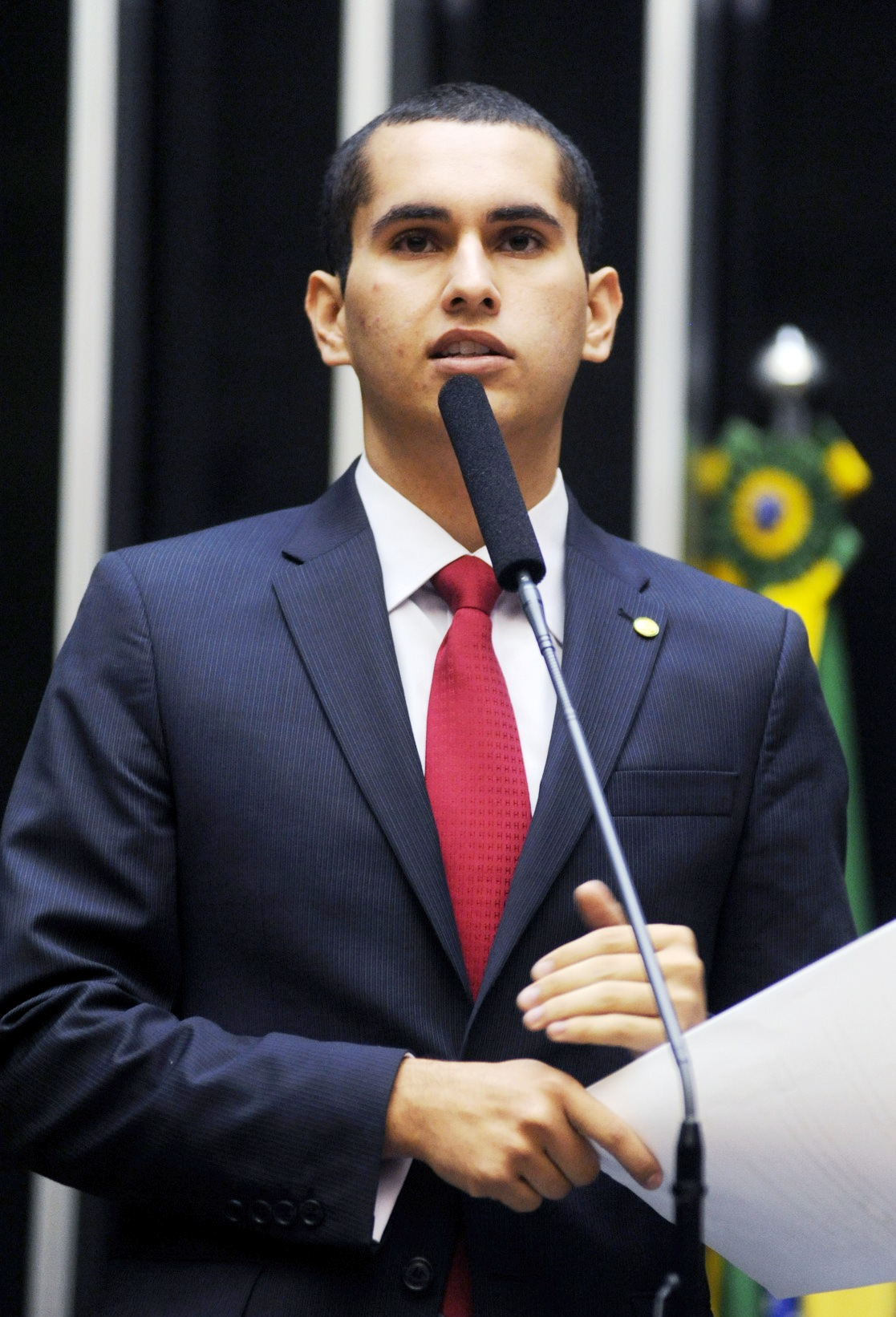
- Neto in 2012

Member of the Chamber of Deputies
- Incumbent
- Assumed office 1 February 2011
- Constituency: Ceará

Personal details
- Born: Domingos Gomes de Aguiar Neto; 29 April 1988 (age 38) Fortaleza, Ceará, Brazil
- Party: PSD (2016–present)
- Other political affiliations: PSB (2009–2013); PROS (2013–2015); PMB (2015–2016)

Domingos Gomes de Aguiar Neto (born 29 April 1988) is a Brazilian lawyer and politician. He holds the position of a federal deputy for Ceará. He was first elected to the Chamber of Deputies at the age of 22 in 2010.

== Early life and education ==
Neto was born to a family of lawyers and politicians. His father, Domingos Gomes de Aguiar Filho, was a deputy governor of Ceará and his mother, Tauá Patrícia Aguiar, was a mayor. His sister, Gabriella Aguiar, is the current vice-mayor of Fortaleza. He did his early education at the Colégio Militar de Fortaleza in Brazil but later moved to the United States to attend Tecumseh High School. With a bachelor's degree in law from University of Fortaleza (UNIFOR) in 2015, the next year, Neto enrolled for a masters’ in Public Administration at the Brasília School of Administration of the Brasília Institute of Public Law (IDP).

== Political career ==
He joined the Brazilian Socialist Party (PSB) in 2009. He contested for a seat in the Chamber of Deputies in 2010 at the age of 22 via a ticket from PSB. He emerged the most voted candidate in Ceará and the 16th nationwide in the election for federal deputies by a total vote share of 246,591. He became affiliated to the Republican Party of the Social Order (PROS) in 2013 and was elected president of PROS Jovem and party leader in the Chamber of Deputies. He chaired two parliamentary committees. From 2013 to 2014, he took a leave of absence from the position of deputy to assume the position of Extraordinary Secretary of the Cup of the City Hall of Fortaleza on the invitation of Mayor Roberto Cláudio.

Neto was re-elected federal deputy on the ticket from the Republican Party of Social Order by 185,226 votes, this time emerging the 4th most voted in his state. In March 2016, he announced his joining the Social Democratic Party (PSD).

On April 17, 2016, Neto voted against the impeachment process of Dilma Rousseff. Being in favor of the Public Expenditure Ceiling (PEC), he also voted for Labor Reform the same month.
