= Ciro Gomes =

Brazilian politician (born 1957)

Ciro Gomes GOMM
- Ciro in 2019

Member of the Chamber of Deputies
- In office 1 February 2007 – 1 February 2011
- Constituency: Ceará

Minister of National Integration
- In office 1 January 2003 – 31 March 2006
- President: Luiz Inácio Lula da Silva
- Preceded by: Luciano Barbosa
- Succeeded by: Pedro Brito

Minister of Finance
- In office 6 September 1994 – 31 December 1994
- President: Itamar Franco
- Preceded by: Rubens Ricupero
- Succeeded by: Pedro Malan

Governor of Ceará
- In office 15 March 1991 – 6 September 1994
- Vice Governor: Lúcio Alcântara
- Preceded by: Tasso Jereissati
- Succeeded by: Francisco Aguiar

Mayor of Fortaleza
- In office 1 January 1989 – 2 April 1990
- Vice Mayor: Juraci Magalhães
- Preceded by: Maria Luíza Fontenele
- Succeeded by: Juraci Magalhães

State Deputy of Ceará
- In office 1 February 1983 – 31 December 1988
- Constituency: At-large

Personal details
- Born: 6 November 1957 (age 69) Pindamonhangaba, São Paulo, Brazil
- Party: PSDB (since 2025)
- Other political affiliations: PDS (1982–1983); PMDB (1983–1990); PSDB (1990–1997); PPS (1997–2005); PSB (2005–2013); PROS (2013–2015); PDT (2015–2025)
- Spouses: Patrícia Saboya (m. 1983; div. 1999) Patricia Pillar (m. 1999; div. 2011) Giselle Bezerra (m. 2017)
- Children: 4
- Relatives: Cid Gomes (brother)
- Education: Federal University of Ceará (LL.B.)
- Profession: Lawyer, university professor, writer

Ciro Ferreira Gomes GOMM (Brazilian Portuguese pronunciation: [ˈsiɾu feˈʁe(j)ɾɐ ˈɡomis]; born 6 November 1957), known mononymously as Ciro, is a Brazilian politician, lawyer, and academic. Ciro is currently affiliated with the Brazilian Social Democracy Party (PSDB).

Born in São Paulo but raised in Ceará by a political family, Ciro began his political career at the age of 27 in 1984. Ciro was elected Mayor of Fortaleza aged 30 in 1988 and was elected Governor of Ceará at the age of 32 in 1990. During his tenure, Ciro was the most popular governor in the country. His Viva Criança program that reduced infant mortality in Ceará by 32% was given an international award by UNICEF. His success led to his appointment as Minister of Finance for a few months in late 1994 under President Itamar Franco, where he presided over the ongoing Real Plan that eventually stabilized the economy and ended hyperinflation.

Ciro ran for President of Brazil for the Popular Socialist Party (PPS) in 1998 and 2002, coming in third and fourth place. In both Ciro presented himself as critical of Fernando Henrique Cardoso presidency and attempted to be a centre-left alternative to petista candidate Luiz Inácio Lula da Silva. Following the election, Ciro was appointed by President Lula as Minister of National Integration, presiding over regional development and the interbasin transfer of the São Francisco River. In 2006, Ciro was elected federal deputy for Ceará. Ciro was expected to succeed Lula for the 2010 election, but Lula instead appointed Energy Minister Dilma Rousseff, a move he criticized. Ciro coordinated her successful presidential campaigns, but afterwards retired to the private sector.

In 2018, Ciro returned to politics after joining the Democratic Labour Party, launching his long-awaited third campaign for the presidency. Running on a platform that included a public credit debt refinancing, a progressive tax system with dividend tax, increased funding for education and healthcare, a federal agency defending LGBTQ rights, and a neo-Keynesian, re-industrializing platform, he sought to portray himself as an alternative between Lula's appointee Fernando Haddad and right-wing candidate Jair Bolsonaro. Though he polled better than Haddad directly against Bolsonaro, Ciro finished in third place. Following Bolsonaro's victory, many argued that Ciro would have won if he had been nominated by a centre-left coalition. Ciro refused to endorse Haddad afterwards, PT's offer to be his running mate, and has opposed Lula's party within the Brazilian left.

Described as having "one of the sharpest tongues in Brazilian politics", Ciro's public image has been characterized by his outspoken personality, receiving both praise and criticism. Ciro was one of the main opposers of Jair Bolsonaro's presidency, accusing Bolsonaro and his sons of criminal militia involvement. Ciro was also critical of Michel Temer's presidency, characterizing Dilma's impeachment as a coup. He has also been critical of Lula's presidency, accusing him of enabling Dilma's impeachment through Temer and Eduardo Cunha's appointments, and both of leading a social liberal government that led to the current Brazilian recession and Bolsonaro's election. Since joining PDT in 2015, Ciro has led a resurgence of PT's traditional left-wing nationalist opposition by PDT and the legacy of Getúlio Vargas and Leonel Brizola, receiving accusations of being a left-wing populist. Ahead of the 2026 election, Ciro reaffiliated with the PSDB to mount a campaign to return as Governor of Ceará, forming a broad coalition including Bolsonaro's Liberal Party. He would be defeated by PT incumbent Elmano de Freitas, an election that Ciro called to be annulled.

In the private sector, Ciro served as director for Brazilian rail company Transnordestina S/A and steelmaker Companhia Siderúrgica Nacional, and he is a best-selling author.

== Early life ==
Ciro was born in Pindamonhangaba, São Paulo, the son of José Euclides Ferreira Gomes Filho and Maria José Ferreira Gomes in 1957. His family moved to Sobral, Ceará in 1962. His father's family, the Ferreira Gomes family, has been active in Ceará politics for several generations.

Ciro enrolled in the Law School of the Federal University of Ceará in 1976. Ciro later recalled that within the student movements of the time, he was most closely affiliated with the Catholic Left. Upon graduation, Ciro returned to the city of Sobral, to work for the local government as a municipal prosecutor.

== State political career ==
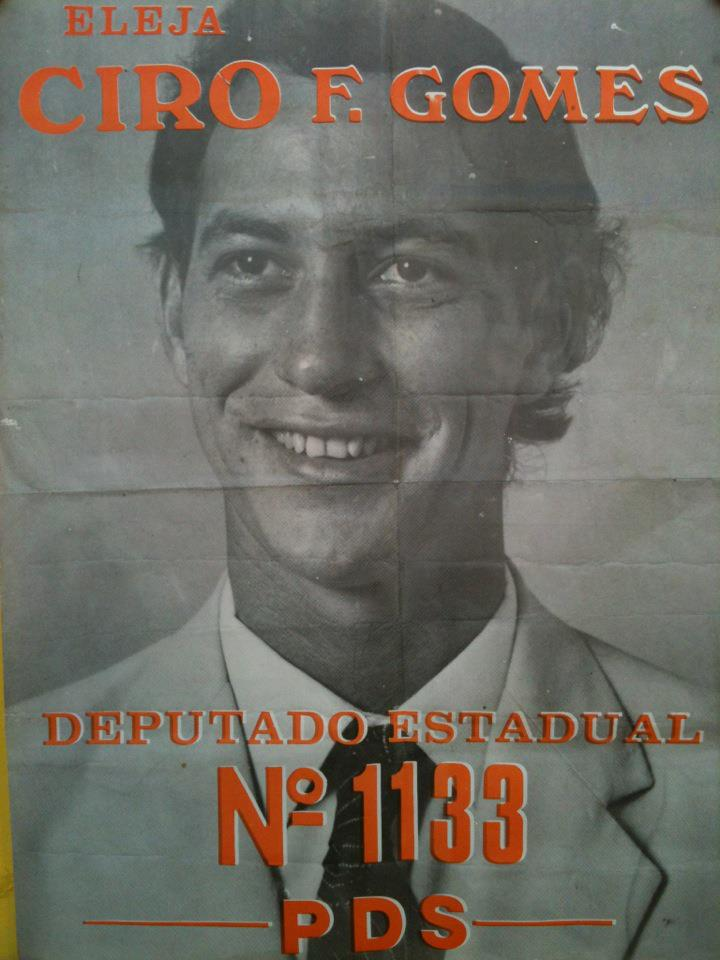
Ciro campaign poster in 1982

=== State politics ===
Ciro ran for office for the first time in 1982, as a State Deputy representing Sobral, and won; he began his first term in February 1983. Ciro attracted substantial media attention early on for his willingness to debate national political questions — including democracy, social reforms, and international relations — which he said other Ceará politicians ignored. In 1985, Ciro also started teaching tax law as a professor at the University of Fortaleza.

In 1988, Ciro was elected Mayor of Fortaleza, the capital of Ceará, and began his term the next year. As Mayor of Fortaleza, Ciro endorsed centre-left candidate Mário Covas in the first round of the 1989 presidential election and socialist candidate Luiz Inácio Lula da Silva in the second round.

==== Governor of Ceará ====
Ciro was elected the Governor of Ceará in 1990, at the age of 32, becoming the second-youngest governor in the country at the time. His efforts included policies to support small businesses and reduce bureaucracy. He also cracked down on tax evasion, increasing state revenue. Ciro also ordered increased investments in education and in public health; by July 1992, a Datafolha poll found he was the most popular governor in Brazil, with a 74% approval rate, and Time magazine listed him as one of the 100 most important emerging leaders on the world stage.

One of his most high-profile achievements as governor was the construction of a 71-mile long water canal, the "Canal do Trabalhador." Northeastern Brazil suffered a series of droughts in 1991, 1992, and 1993; in 1993, Ciro managed to organize and complete the construction of the canal in only 3 months, successfully bringing water to the capital city of Fortaleza and thus preventing a water supply crisis.

Ciro's public health program "Programa Viva Criança" was attributed with a 32% decrease in infant mortality in the state and was awarded the Maurice Paté prize by UNICEF.

=== 2026 Ceará election ===
Ciro would depart the PDT in October 2025 and rejoin the PSDB, becoming the PSDB's candidate for Governor of Ceará in the 2026 election against PT incumbent Elmano de Freitas. His running mate was Roberto Cláudio of Brazil Union. Once an opponent of Bolsonarism, Ciro's coalition included the Bolsonaro family's Liberal Party in an attempt to form a broad front against the dominant PT in Ceará. Ciro would be defeated in the first round, with de Freitas receiving 53.19% of the vote and Ciro receiving 46.22%. Simultaneously, Ciro's brother Cid Gomes would be re-elected to the Senate as a member of the Brazilian Socialist Party on the same day, running on the same ticket as de Freitas.

After the election, Ciro called for the results to be annulled and refused to congratulate de Freitas.

== National political career ==
=== Minister of Finance ===
In 1994 he served as Minister of Finance in the administration of Itamar Franco for less than four months. This appointment came at a crucial time in Brazil's modern economic development, when the Real Plan was underway as an economic stabilization program to fight hyperinflation. Although his appointment occurred only 28 days prior to the presidential election that year, his short stint overseeing the Real Plan was credited by some with helping Fernando Henrique Cardoso win after Cardoso campaigned on continuing the plan's implementation. However, Ciro would break with the Cardoso government in 1997.

=== 1998 presidential candidacy ===
Map of the 1998 Brazilian presidential election. Ciro only managed to win his home state of Ceará.

A founding member of the Brazilian Social Democracy Party (PSDB) in 1988, Ciro would leave the party, which was originally centre-left, in 1997 following its right turn. Ciro would join the Socialist People's Party (PPS) in opposition to the Cardoso administration, and ran as a member of the party for president in 1998 with Roberto Freire as his running mate. During the campaign, Ciro attempted to position himself as a left alternative to Luiz Inácio Lula da Silva, a staple of the Brazilian left who had run for president twice prior to 1998 as a member of the Workers' Party (PT).

The centrist Brazilian Democratic Movement (PMDB), a kingmaker in Brazilian politics, considered supporting his candidacy, but did not end up doing so. In the end, Ciro came in third place in the first round, and won 11% of the vote (only the top two candidates advance to the second round). The sole state he won was Ceará, his home state. However, Cardoso was re-elected with a majority.

=== 2002 presidential candidacy and aftermath ===
During the 2002 presidential election, Ciro looked to be formidable, even passing PSDB candidate José Serra, the main centre-right candidate, at one point in the polls. However, a series of gaffes, most notable a crass joke about his wife Patrícia Pillar, led to his collapse in the polls, and Ciro came in fourth place in the first round, with 12% of the vote. He supported Luiz Inácio Lula da Silva in the second round of the 2002 election, and was ultimately chosen to be the Minister for National Integration in Lula's new government. When the PPS' leadership voted to leave the governing coalition in December 2004 that propped up Lula's government, Ciro chose to remain in his post. As a result, the PPS removed him from the party leadership, and he decided to join the Brazilian Socialist Party (PSB) in 2005. In 2006 he was elected to the Chamber of Deputies with 16.19% of the vote, the highest percentage ever achieved by a single candidate in a proportional election.

He has been publicly critical of the efforts to impeach Dilma Rousseff and prosecute Lula.

=== 2018 presidential election ===
Having passed on a presidential campaign in 2010, Ciro announced his long-awaited third bid for the presidency in the 2018 presidential election as the candidate of the PDT. For the position of Vice President, Ciro chose Kátia Abreu, a centre former Minister of Agriculture, as his running mate.

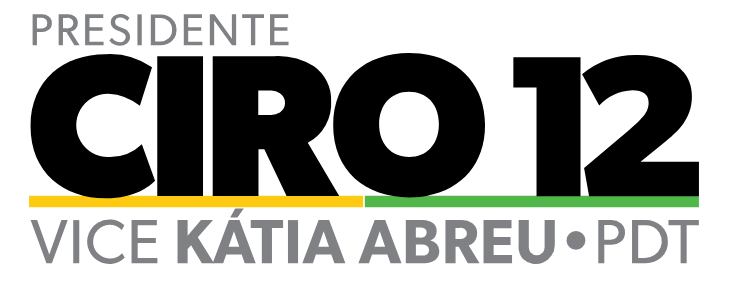
Logo used during Ciro's 2018 presidential campaign.

Political analysts had widely speculated that, since Lula was legally barred from running for president (after his conviction for corruption, under Brazil's "Ficha Limpa" law), Ciro would attract many of Lula's supporters in the 2018 presidential election, and potentially unite a number of left and center-left political parties. His main contender for the left vote was Fernando Haddad, the former Mayor of São Paulo, running as a member of the Workers' Party (PT) with Lula's backing. Polling showed that Ciro would have performed better versus Bolsonaro in the second round than Haddad would have.

While Ciro polled competitively throughout most of the election, Lula's endorsement of Haddad rallied enough of his former voters to support Haddad. As a result, Ciro finished in third place in the first round, only coming in first place in his home state of Ceará.

In the second round, Ciro announced his opposition to right-wing rival Jair Bolsonaro, who he describes as a "fascist" for his pro-military rule statements, but did not formally endorse Haddad. Following the election of Bolsonaro over Haddad, a number of major left figures including Governor Rui Costa of Bahia, a member of the PT, indicated they regret supporting Haddad over Ciro.

=== 2022 presidential election ===
Ciro Gomes (PDT) vote distribution in the first round

Ciro Gomes ran for president for the fourth time in the 2022 presidential election, finishing in fourth place.

== Personal life ==
Ciro has lived in Ceará for most of his life, graduating with a degree in law from the Federal University of Ceará. He was a professor of tax law and constitutional law, and wrote three books on political economy: "No País dos Conflitos" ("In the Country of Conflicts", 1994); "O Próximo Passo – Uma Alternativa Prática ao Neoliberalismo" ("The Next Step - A Practical Alternative to Neoliberalism", 1995), co-authored with Harvard professor Roberto Mangabeira Unger; and "Um Desafio Chamado Brasil" ("A Challenge Called Brazil," 2002).

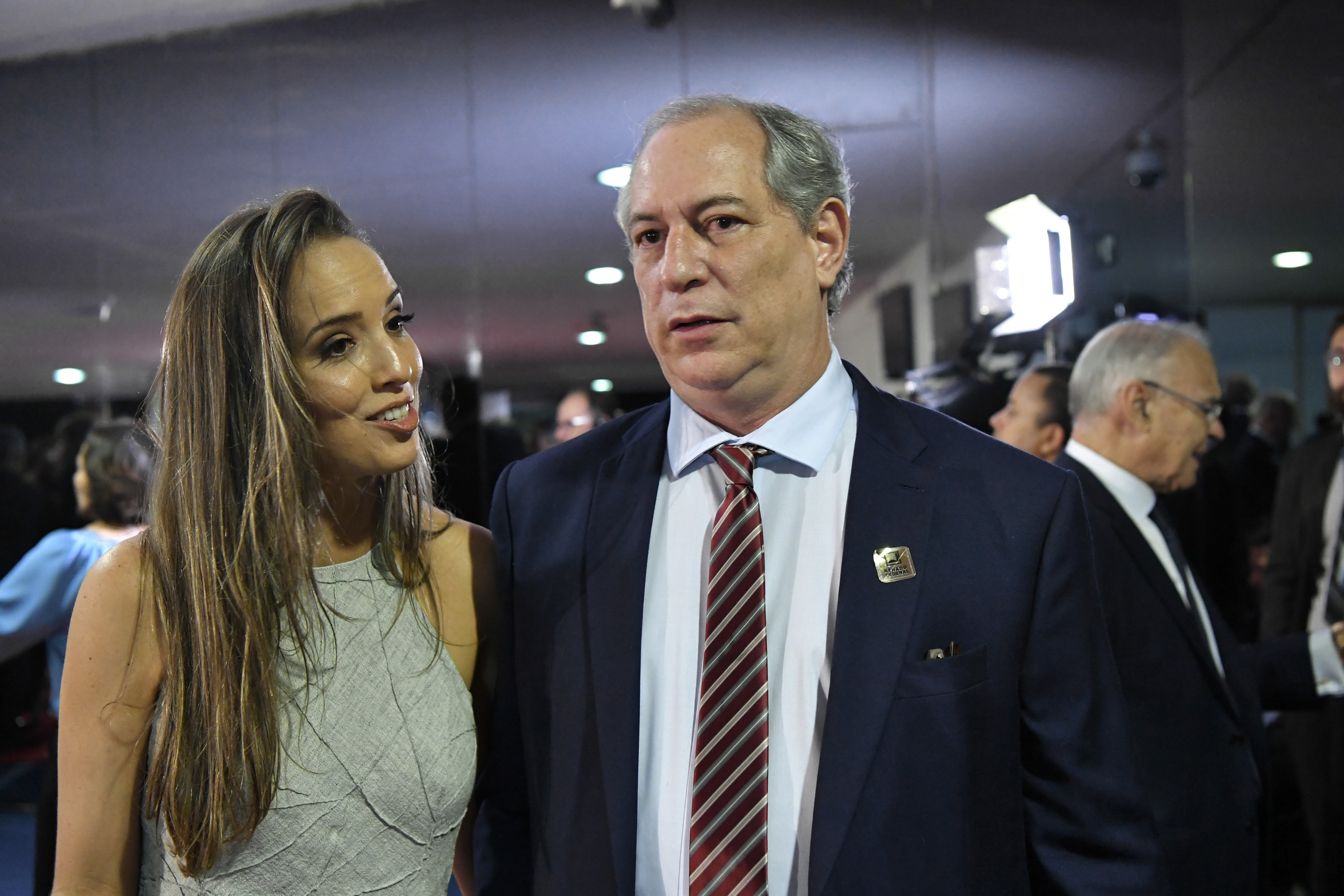
Ciro with his girlfriend Giselle Bezerra.

He was also a visiting researcher at Harvard Law School. He served in the private sector as the President of Transnordestina S/A (a commodities transportation company in Northeastern Brazil), and on the Board of Directors of Companhia Siderúrgica Nacional. Two of his four siblings (Cid Gomes and Ivo Gomes), his father, and his uncle, have all been involved in Brazilian politics.

He was married to his first wife, politician Patrícia Saboya, from 1983 to 1999, with whom he has three children: Lívia, Ciro and Yuri. Like her husband, Patricia Saboya Gomes was also politically active in the Northeastern state of Ceara, including serving as a Federal Deputy and a Senator for the state; the two were seen as political allies. From 1999 to 2011, Ciro was married to Brazilian actress Patrícia Pillar. In 2013, he began a relationship with Zara Castro, with whom he had his fourth child, Gael, in 2015. Ciro is the godfather of his advisor Roberto Mangabeira Unger's eldest child, Gabriel.

Since 2017, his girlfriend has been TV producer Giselle Bezerra; she was previously a dancer on the popular Brazilian TV show Xuxa.

== Electoral history ==
Year	Election	Party	Office	Coalition	Partners	Party	Votes	Percent	Result
1982	State Elections of Ceará	PDS	State Deputy	—N/a			11,600	—N/a	Elected
1986	State Elections of Ceará	MDB	State Deputy	Pro-Change Coalition (PMDB, PDC, PCB, PCdoB)	—N/a		17,602	—N/a	Elected
1988	Municipal Election of Fortaleza	MDB	Mayor	Coalition of Changes (PMDB, PMB)	Juraci Magalhães	MDB	178,274	30.55%	Elected
1990	State Elections of Ceará	PSDB	Governor	Ceará Best Generation (PSDB, PDT, PTB, PDC, PSC, PCN)	Lúcio Alcântara	PDT	1,279,492	54.32%	Elected
1998	Presidential Election	PPS	President	Real and Fair Brazil (PPS, PL, PAN)	Roberto Freire	PPS	7,426,190	10.97%	Not elected
2002	Presidential Election	PPS	President	Labour Front (PPS, PTB, PDT)	Paulo Pereira da Silva	PDT	10,170,882	11.97%	Not Elected
2006	State Elections of Ceará	PSB	Federal Deputy	Ceará Votes to Grow (PSB, PT, PCdoB, PMDB, PRB, PP, PHS, PMN, PV)	—N/a		667,830	16.19%	Elected
2018	Presidential Election	PDT	President	Sovereign Brazil (PDT, AVANTE)	Kátia Abreu	PDT	13,344,371	12.47%	Not elected
2022	Presidential Election	PDT	President	—N/a	Ana Paula Matos	PDT	3,599,287	3.04%	Not elected
2026	State Elections of Ceará	PSDB	Governor	Unite to Change (PSDB, Cidadania, UNIÃO, PP, PL, Avante, DC)	Roberto Cláudio	UNIÃO	2,498,891	46.22%	Not elected

== Awards ==
- Medal of Merit for Defense (Order of Great Cross), awarded by the President, on November 21, 2003.
- Juscelino Kubitscheck Medal (Highest Order), awarded by the Governor of Minas Gerais, 1997.
- World Prize from UNICEF - Maurice Pate Leadership for Children Award, 1993.

== Published works ==
He has written four books:

- No País dos Conflitos (1994) - co-authored with Miriam Leitão.
- O Próximo Passo – Uma Alternativa Prática ao Neoliberalismo (1996) - co-authored with Roberto Mangabeira Unger.
- Um Desafio Chamado Brasil (2002) - a collection of op-eds written for the newspapers O Estado de S. Paulo and Jornal da Tarde between 1995 and 1999.
- Projeto Nacional: O Dever Da Esperança (2020).

== See also ==
- List of mayors of Fortaleza

Political offices
Preceded by Maria Luíza Fontenele	Mayor of Fortaleza; 1989–1990	Succeeded by Juraci Magalhães
Preceded by Tasso Jereissati	Governor of Ceará; 1991–1994	Succeeded by Francisco Aguiar
Preceded by Rubens Ricupero	Minister of Finance; 1994–1995	Succeeded by Pedro Malan
Preceded by Luciano Barbosa	Minister of National Integration; 2003–2006	Succeeded by Pedro Brito
Party political offices
New political party	PPS nominee for President of Brazil; 1998, 2002	Most recent
Preceded by Cristovam Buarque (2006)	PDT nominee for President of Brazil; 2018, 2022	Most recent
