= José Marinho de Vasconcelos =

Brazilian politician

José Marinho de Vasconcelos was a Brazilian bricklayer and politician. He was state deputy of Ceará by the Brazilian Communist Party (PCB) between 24 January 1947 and 8 January 1948, losing his office owing to the illegalization of PCB.
