= Evandro Leitão =

Brazilian politician affiliated with the worker' party

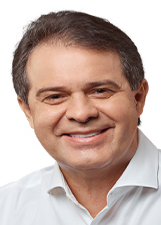

Mayor of Fortaleza
- Incumbent
- Assumed office 1 January 2025
- Vice Mayor: Gabriella Aguiar
- Preceded by: José Sarto

President of the Legislative Assembly of Ceará
- In office 1 February 2021 – 31 December 2024
- Preceded by: José Sarto

State deputy of Ceará
- In office 1 February 2015 – 31 December 2024

Secretary of Work and Social Development of Ceará
- In office 2011–2013

Personal details
- Born: Evandro Sá Barreto Leitão; 16 April 1967 (age 59) Fortaleza, Ceará, Brazil
- Party: PDT (2009–2023); PT (2023–present)
- Spouse: Cristiane Sales Leitão
- Children: 3
- Education: University of Fortaleza

Evandro Sá Barreto Leitão (born 16 April 1967) is a Brazilian politician who is affiliated with the Workers' Party (PT). He was a state deputy in the state of Ceará, and was president of the Legislative Assembly of Ceará (Alece). In 2024, he was elected mayor of the city of Fortaleza, and took office on 1 January 2025.

In 2022, he was reelected as a state deputy with 113,808 votes. This was his third consecutive run and was elected president of the state assembly for the 2021-2022 half-session and was reelected president for the other half-session, from 2023 to 2024.

== Biography ==
Leitão was born on 16 April 1967 in Fortaleza. He is the son of Wellington Rocha Leitão and Silvia Maria Miranda Barreto Leitão. Evandro is married to Cristiane Sales Leitão, and has three children: Kaio, Cecília and Eduardo. He has one grandchild, Lucca.

Leitão has worked as a public servant, including as the joint auditor of the State Secretary of Finances of Ceará (Sefaz). He graduated with a degree in Economic Sciences from the University of Fortaleza (Unifor), and later with a law degree from the Faculdade Integrada do Ceará (FIC). He also has done post-graduate work in public management with the Administration Secretary of Ceará, and in marketing from the Bolsa de Valores Regional.

=== President of Ceará Sporting Club (2008-2015) ===
Due to his graduation as an economist, Leitão came to work as one of the directors of Ceará Sporting Club, one of Northeast Brazil's main sports teams. Starting in March 2008, he became the president of the club, later being reelected to serve in the position until 2015. As part of the "Alvinegro" (or "Vovô"), the team would go on to win an edition of the Copa do Nordeste, the Campeonato Cearense four times, an ascension to Campeonato Brasileiro Série A, as well as a rare appearance at the Copa Sudamericana.

After stepping down from the presidency, Leitão would go on to be part of the deliberative council of the club from 2018 to 2022.

=== 2010 State Elections ===
After a particularly successful season for Ceará Sporting Club, including advancing to the 2009 Campeonato Brasileiro Série A (third place in the 2009 Série B), Leitão began to pursue a career in politics. In 2010, as a member of the Democratic Labour Party (PDT), he ran for a seat in the Legislative Assembly, obtaining 31,850 votes.

Though he was unsuccessful in this election, becoming a substitute, he was invited to become a state secretary for the year after.

=== State Secretary of Work and Social Development (2011-2013) ===
Leitão has been nominated to become the state secretary of Work and Social Development of Ceará from 2011 to 2013 during the second term of governor Cid Gomes.

=== State deputy (2015-present) ===
Leitão was elected as a state deputy for the first time in 2014 with 70,228 votes, being the 12th most voted for candidate among the 46 elected. He became known in state politics as the leader of Camilo Santana's coalition in the state legislature from 2015 to 2018.

In 2018, he had been voted for in 172 different municipalities. He was the ninth place out of the 46 seats in the Legislative Assembly and in fifth place in the coalition, receiving 83,486 votes. Leitão was elected president of the Legislative Assembly of Ceará by unanimous vote for 2021 to 2022 and reelected for the 2023-2024 period. Leitão would go on to become a member, be president, or councilmember of various organizations and councils relating to various causes in Ceará.

Leitão had been considered as a candidate for the PDT to run for governor in 2022, but had previously declared that he was working with the intention of his own re-election as a state deputy. In April, he signaled support for the candidacy for the incumbent governor of Ceará, Izolda Cela.

On 29 August 2023, he confirmed his exit from the PDT. On 17 December 2023, he became affiliated with the PT, with the objective to run for the mayoral race in Fortaleza. In a tight race, he won against André Fernandes of the PL, and is set to take office on 1 January 2025.
