= Moses Rodrigues =

Brazilian politician (born 1978)

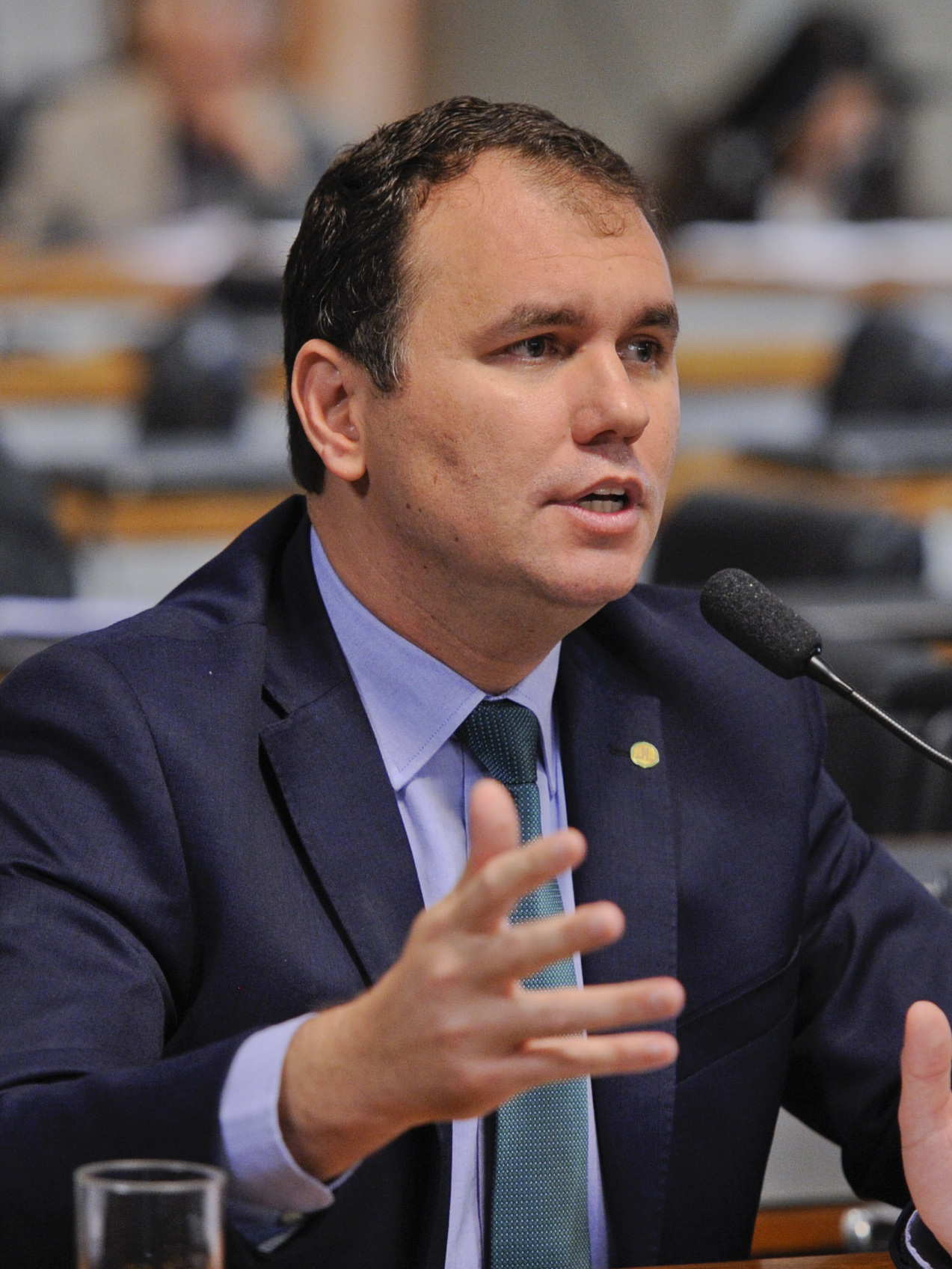
- Rodrigues in 2017

Member of the Chamber of Deputies
- Incumbent
- Assumed office 1 February 2015
- Constituency: Ceará

Personal details
- Born: Moses Haendel Melo Spíndola Rodrigues; 6 July 1978 (age 48) Sobral, Ceará, Brazil
- Party: UNIÃO (since 2022)
- Other political affiliations: PMDB (2011–2013); PPS (2013–2016); MDB (2016–2022)
- Children: Moses Filho
- Parent: Oscar Rodrigues (father)

Moses Haendel Melo Spíndola Rodrigues (born 6 July 1978) is a Brazilian politician serving as a member of the Chamber of Deputies since 2015. He is the son of Oscar Rodrigues.
