= List of mayors of Fortaleza =

The following is a list of mayors of the city of Fortaleza, Brazil.

- 1 José Freire Bezerril Fontenelle, 1890
- Manuel Nogueira Borges, 1890-1891
- Joaquim de Oliveira Catunda, 1891-1892
- Guilherme César da Rocha, 1892-1912
- João Marinho de Albuquerque Andrade, 1912
- Ildefonso Albano, 1912-1914, 1921-1923
- Casimiro Ribeiro Brasil Montenegro, 1914-1918
- Rubens Monte, 1918-1920
- Godofredo Maciel, 1920-1921
- Adolfo Gonçalves de Siqueira, 1923-1924
- Godofredo Maciel, 1924-1928
- Álvaro Weyne, 1928-1930, 1935-1936
- César Cals de Oliveira, 1930-1931
- Antônio Urbano de Almeida, 1931
- Tibúrcio Cavalcante, 1931-1933
- Raimundo Girão, 1933-1934
- José Barreira, 1934
- 10 Plínio Pompeu de Sabóia Magalhães, 1934-1935
- Gentil Barreira, 1935
- Raimundo de Alencar Araripe, 1936-1945
- Plácido Aderaldo Castelo, 1945
- Vicente Linhares, 1945-1946
- Oscar Barbosa, 1946
- Romeu Coelho Martins, 1946
- Clóvis Matos, 1946-1947
- José Leite Maranhão, 1947-1948
- Acrísio Moreira da Rocha, 1948-1951, 1955-1959
- Paulo Cabral de Araújo, 1951-1955
- 20 Manuel Cordeiro Neto, 1959-1963
- Murilo Borges Moreira, 1963-1967
- José Walter Cavalcante, 1967-1971
- Vicente Cavalcante Fialho, 1971-1975
- Evandro Ayres de Moura, 1975-1978
- Luís Gonzaga Nogueira Marques, 1978-1979
- Lúcio Alcântara, 1979-1982
- José Aragão e Albuquerque Júnior, 1982-1983
- César Cals Neto, 1983-1985
- José Maria de Barros Pinho, 1985-1986
- Maria Luíza Fontenele, 1986-1989
- Ciro Gomes, 1989-1990
- 30 Juraci Magalhães, 1990-1992
- 31 Antônio Cambraia, 1993-2005
- 32 Luizianne Lins, 2005-2012
- 33 Roberto Cláudio, 2013-2020
- 34 José Sarto, 2021-2025
- Evandro Leitão, 2025-present

== See also ==
- Fortaleza politics
- Câmara Municipal de Fortaleza (city council)
- Municipal elections in Fortaleza
- Timeline of Fortaleza
- List of mayors of largest cities in Brazil (in Portuguese)
- List of mayors of capitals of Brazil (in Portuguese)
