= Acopiara =

Municipality in Ceará, Brazil

Coordinates: 6°06′S 39°27′W

- Municipality
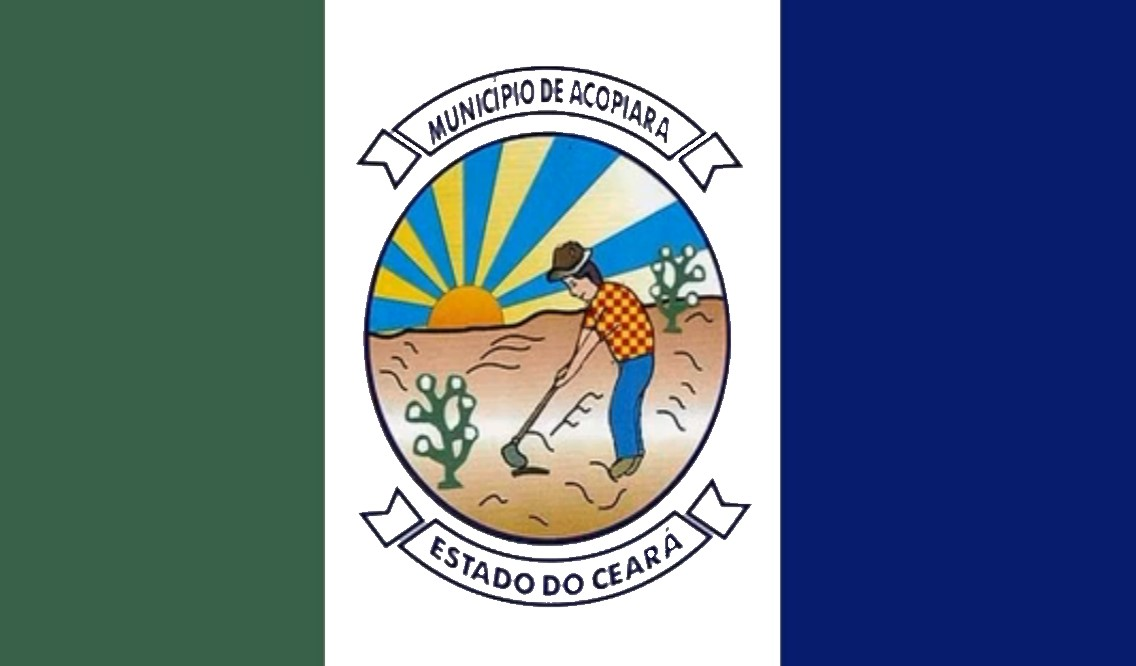
- Flag
- Interactive map of Acopiara
- Country: Brazil
- Region: Nordeste
- State: Ceará
- Mesoregion: Sertoes Cearenses

Population (2020)
  - Total: 54,481
- Time zone: UTC−3 (BRT)

Acopiara is a municipality in the state of Ceará in the Northeast region of Brazil.

== Districts ==
- Acopiara
- Santa Felícia
- São Paulinho
- Trussu

== See also ==
- List of municipalities in Ceará
