= Eduardo Girão =

Brazilian politician

- Official portrait

Senator for Ceará
- Incumbent
- Assumed office 1 February 2019

Chairman of Fortaleza Esporte Clube
- In office June 2017 – December 2017
- Preceded by: Marcello Desidério
- Succeeded by: Marcelo Paz

Personal details
- Born: Luís Eduardo Grangeiro Girão; 25 September 1972 (age 54) Fortaleza, Ceará, Brazil
- Party: NOVO (2023–present)
- Other political affiliations: PROS (2018–19); PODE (2019–23)

Luís Eduardo Grangeiro Girão (born 25 September 1972) more commonly known as Eduardo Girão is a Brazilian politician as well as a businessman and football club president. He has spent his political career representing Ceará, having served as federal senator since 2019.

== Personal life ==
Religiously, Girão considers himself as spiritualist, and was one of the biggest supporters in the establishment of the "National Day of Spiritism" as a federal holiday, which is on April 18, the date of publication of "The Book of Spirits" by Allan Kardec.

In 2017 Girão was elected chairman of the Fortaleza Esporte Clube.

== Political career ==
Girão was elected to the federal senate in the 2018 Brazilian general election. In 2019 Girão switched to the Podemos party. In 2023, he switched to the New Party (NOVO).

In the 2026 elections, Girão was initially a pre-candidate for governor of Ceará. However, on 4 August 2026, the Novo Party announced that he would be the vice-presidential candidate on Romeu Zema's ticket.

Sporting positions
Preceded by Marcello Desidério	Chairman of Fortaleza Esporte Clube; 2017	Succeeded by Marcelo Paz
