= André Fernandes =

Brazilian politician (born 1997)

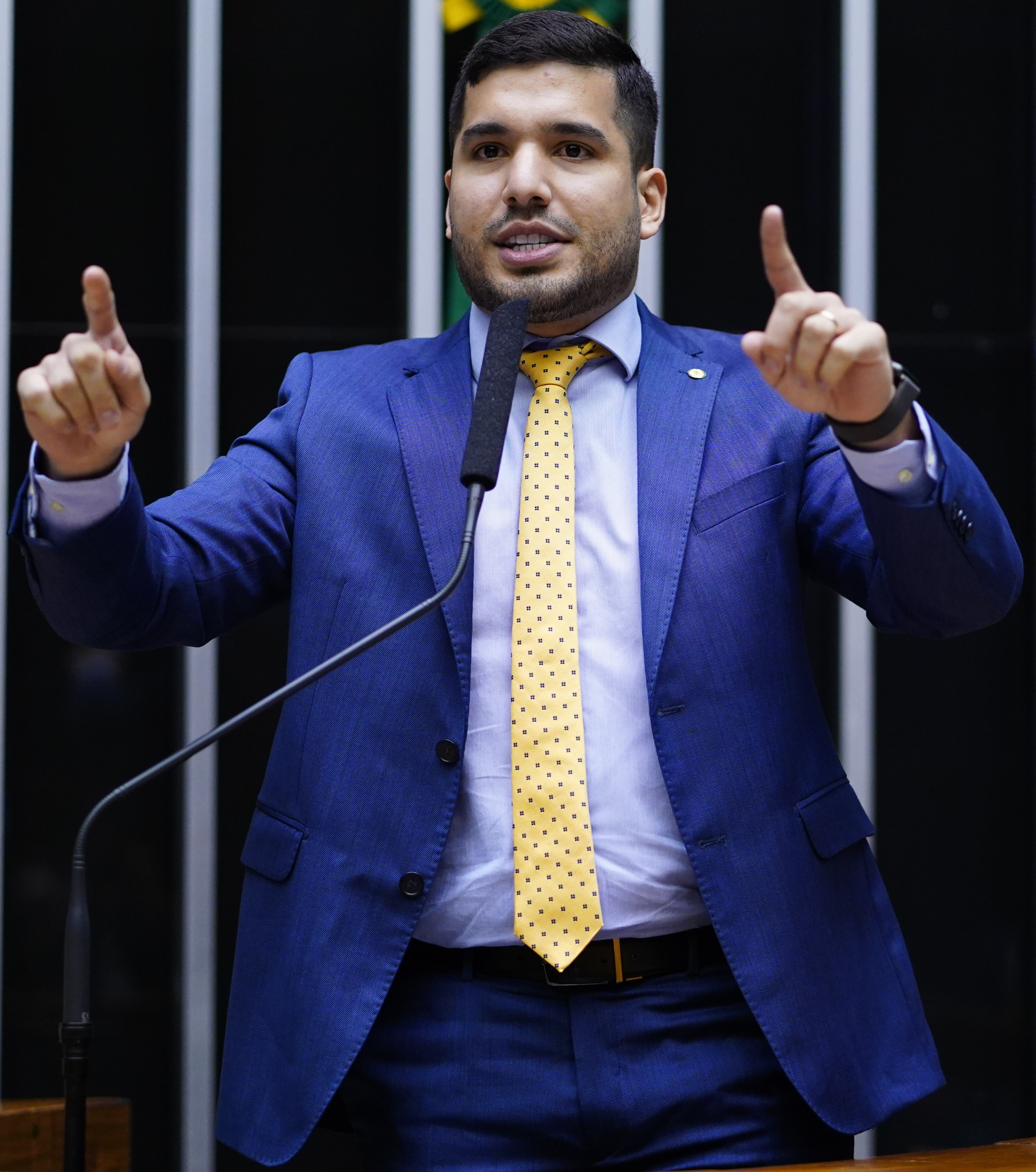
- Fernandes in 2023

Member of the Chamber of Deputies
- Incumbent
- Assumed office 1 February 2023
- Constituency: Ceará

Member of the Legislative Assembly of Ceará
- In office 1 February 2019 – 1 February 2023
- Constituency: At-large

Personal details
- Born: André Fernandes de Moura; 10 December 1997 (age 28) Iguatu, Ceará, Brazil
- Party: PL (since 2022)
- Other political affiliations: Patriota (2017–2018); PSL (2018–2020); Republicanos (2020–2022)
- Parent: Alcides Fernandes (father)

YouTube information
- Channel: Andrefernandesoficial
- Subscribers: 637 thousand
- Views: 28.4 million
- Last updated: 28 March 2025

André Fernandes de Moura (born 10 December 1997) is a Brazilian politician serving as a member of the Chamber of Deputies since 2023. From 2019 to 2022, he was a member of the Legislative Assembly of Ceará.
