= Célio Studart =

Brazilian politician (born 1987)

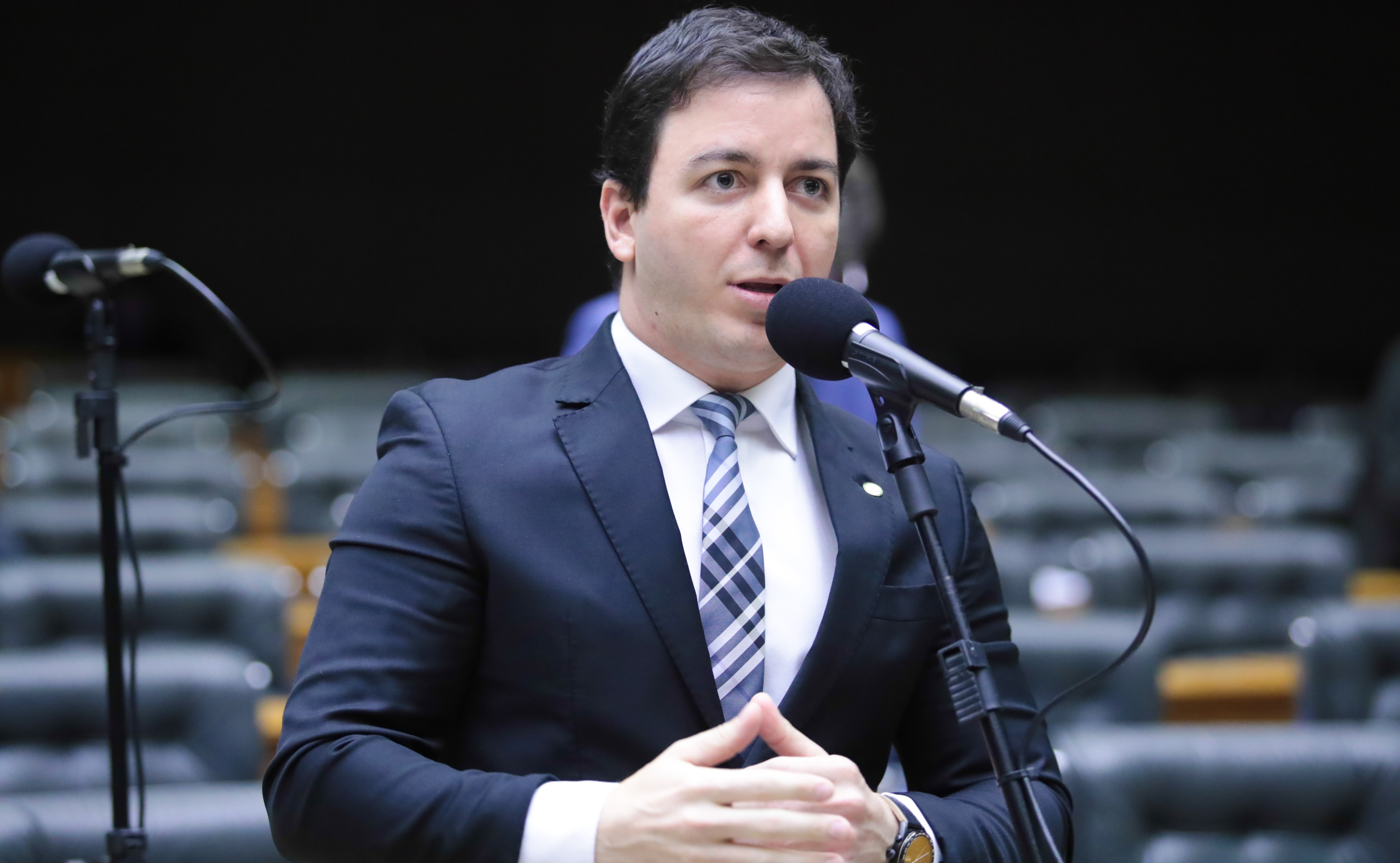
- Studart in 2024

Member of the Chamber of Deputies
- Incumbent
- Assumed office 1 February 2019
- Constituency: Ceará

Member of the Municipal Chamber of Fortaleza
- In office 1 January 2017 – 1 February 2019
- Constituency: At-large

Personal details
- Born: Célio Studart Barbosa; 19 June 1987 (age 39) Fortaleza, Ceará, Brazil
- Party: PSD (since 2022)
- Other political affiliations: PV (2011–2016, 2018–2022); Solidariedade (2016–2018)

Célio Studart Barbosa (born 19 June 1987) is a Brazilian politician serving as a member of the Chamber of Deputies since 2019. He served as secretary of animal protection of Ceará from August to December 2023 and in March 2024.
