= Legislative Assembly of Ceará =

Coordinates: 3°45′01″S 38°30′08″W

Legislative Assembly of Ceará Assembleia Legislativa do Ceará
- 31st legislature (2023-2027)

Type
- Type: Unicameral

Leadership
- President: Romeu Aldigueri, PSB since 1 February 2025
- 1st VP: Danniel Oliveira, MDB
- Government Leader: Guilherme Sampaio, PT

Structure
- Seats: 46 deputies
- Political groups: Brazil of Hope (10) (Note: PT (9) PCdoB (1)) PSB (10) PDT (4) UNIÃO (4) MDB (3) PP (3) PSD (3) Always Forward (2) (Note: Cidadania (1) PSDB (1)) Avante (2) PL (2) Republicans (2) PSOL (1)

Elections
- Voting system: Proportional representation
- Last election: 2 October 2022
- Next election: 2026

Meeting place
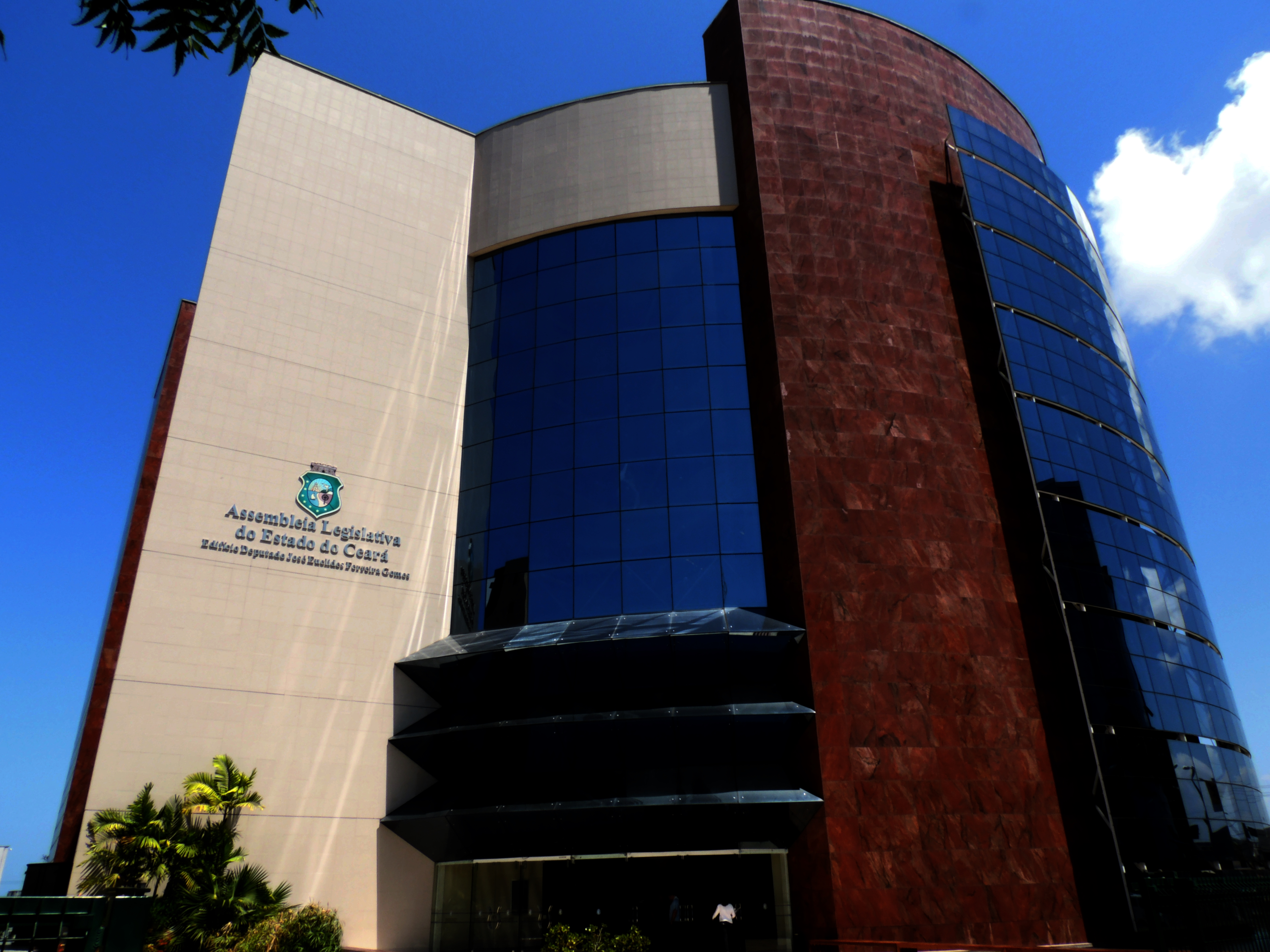
- Palácio Deputado Adauto Bezerra, Fortaleza

Website
- www.al.ce.gov.br

The Legislative Assembly of Ceará (Portuguese: Assembleia Legislativa do Ceará) is the unicameral legislature of Ceará state in Brazil. It has 46 state deputies elected by proportional representation.

The first legislature was in 1835 and had 28 deputies, the headquarters was in Palácio Senador Alencar during 106 years, now it's in Palácio Deputado Adauto Bezerra since 1977.
