= Flávio Bolsonaro 2026 presidential campaign =

Brazilian electoral campaign

- Campaign: 2026 Brazilian general election
- Candidate: Flávio Bolsonaro; Senator for Rio de Janeiro; (2019–present); Alfredo Gaspar; Federal deputy for Alagoas; (2023–present)
- Affiliation: Liberal Party
- Status: Announced: 5 December 2025; Official nominee: 25 July 2026; Official launch: 16 August 2026; Qualified to run-off: 4 October 2026; Lost election: 25 October 2026
- Slogan: Brazil is going to win

The Flávio Bolsonaro 2026 presidential campaign was officialized on 25 July 2026 in São Paulo. His running mate is Alfredo Gaspar, a Federal Deputy for Alagoas. Bolsonaro, who has served as a Senator for Rio de Janeiro since 2019, became the Liberal Party's presidential candidate for the 2026 election and the leader of Bolsonarism after his father, Jair Bolsonaro, was declared politically ineligible on June 30, 2023, and arrested on August 4, 2025, for attempting a coup d'état.

== Background ==
Flávio Bolsonaro's father, Jair Bolsonaro—then President of Brazil and candidate for re-election—was defeated by Luiz Inácio Lula da Silva in the 2022 presidential election, in what was the closest presidential election result in Brazil to date. On June 30, 2023, Jair Bolsonaro was declared ineligible to hold public office for abuse of political power and misuse of the media, following a meeting with foreign ambassadors held on July 18, 2022, which was broadcast by TV Brasil and during which the then-president levelled unfounded attacks against the electoral system. On August 4, 2025, Supreme Federal Court Justice Alexandre de Moraes ordered the former president's house arrest in the context of investigations into an attempted coup d'état involving Bolsonaro and several former members of his administration. The measure was subsequently converted to pretrial detention in November of the same year.

After serving terms as a State Deputy in the Legislative Assembly of Rio de Janeiro (2003–2019) and holding the office of Senator since 2019, Flávio Bolsonaro has consolidated his position as one of the principal strategists of the Liberal Party in the National Congress. On December 5, 2025, he publicly announced his pre-candidacy for the presidency in the 2026 election, stating that he had received the endorsement of his father during a visit to the prison where the former president is being held at the Federal Police Superintendency in Brasília. In a statement published on his social media, the senator declared: "It is with great responsibility that I confirm the decision of Brazil's foremost political and moral leader, Jair Messias Bolsonaro, to entrust me with the mission of continuing our national project". In addition to Flávio, another name considered for the candidacy supported by Jair Bolsonaro was the Governor of São Paulo, Tarcísio de Freitas. His brother, then-Federal Deputy for São Paulo Eduardo Bolsonaro, as well as the president of the Liberal Party Valdemar Costa Neto, lent their support to his candidacy.

The convention that formalized his candidacy took place on July 25, 2026, at the Pacaembu Convention Center in São Paulo. Among those in attendance was the President of Argentina, Javier Milei. Prior to the convention, his candidacy faced successive internal crises, including the release of a video in which Michelle Bolsonaro claimed to have been disrespected, humiliated, and mistreated by Flávio Bolsonaro. This internal conflict is attributed to disagreements over the political strategies of the Liberal Party in the state of Ceará.

== Political positions ==
Flávio Bolsonaro defends amnesty, for his father, and those involved in the January 8 attacks in Brasília and the impeachment of Alexandre de Moraes.

On June 18, 2026, Bolsonaro unveiled his public security plan entitled "Brazil Without Fear," in which he proposes that all Brazilian criminal organizations, including the Primeiro Comando da Capital (PCC) and the Comando Vermelho (CV), be classified as narcoterrorist organizations. He stated that "they will be pursued with force and intelligence, so that their leaders are arrested and their illicit enterprises are suffocated".

On July 16, during a live broadcast with former chairwoman of Caixa Econômica Federal Daniella Marques, he launched a plan entitled "Brazil for Them" (Brasil por Elas), in which, among other proposals, he proposes providing internet access to 70 million women and creating an artificial intelligence platform tailored for women, named MarIA.

The campaign proposes that Bolsa Família beneficiaries who get a formal job or open their own business continue to receive the aid for up to 24 months. In case of loss of the new source of income, the family would have the right to return immediately to the program. Creation of a folder to replace the current Ministry of Social Development, focused on training, professional qualification and granting of credit to generate, known as Ministry of Prosperity.

== Vice presidential selection ==
Since announcing his candidacy, Flávio Bolsonaro has sought to attract parties from the so-called Centrão to form an electoral alliance and offer the vice-presidential slot, which would give him greater campaign infrastructure and more TV and radio time. The main parties Flávio initially tried to attract were the Progressive Union Federation (Brazil Union and PP) and Republicans. After several signs that these parties would declare neutrality in the presidential race, Flávio began talks with Podemos. Should he fail to secure any alliance, Flávio would have to form a ticket on his own, with a running mate from within the PL itself.

Flávio and the PL have consistently indicated a preference for a female running mate, in an attempt to reduce rejection among female voters. Below are the main names from each party that have already been speculated about or mentioned as possible running mates for Flávio Bolsonaro.

Liberal Party (PL)

- Bia Kicis (DF), federal deputy for the Federal District (2019–present) and chair of the Constitution and Justice Committee (2021)
- Júlia Zanatta (SC), federal deputy for Santa Catarina (2023–present) and deputy leader of the PL bench in the Chamber of Deputies
- Priscila Costa (CE), federal deputy for Ceará (2023, 2026–present), city councilor of Fortaleza (2021–2025), and national vice president of PL Mulher (women's wing of the PL) since 2025
- Rosana Valle (SP), federal deputy for São Paulo (2019–present) and president of the PL in the state of São Paulo
- Greyce Elias (MG), federal deputy for Minas Gerais (2019–present), city councilor of Patrocínio (2013–2017)
- Marcos Pontes (SP), senator for São Paulo (2023–present) and minister of Science, Technology and Innovation (2019–2022)
- Rogério Marinho (RN), senator for Rio Grande do Norte (2023–present), minister of Regional Development (2020–2022), special secretary for Social Security and Labor (2019–2020), and federal deputy for Rio Grande do Norte (2007–2019)

Progressistas (PP)

- Tereza Cristina (MS), senator for Mato Grosso do Sul (2023–present) and minister of Agriculture, Livestock and Food Supply (2019–2022)
- Simone Marquetto (SP), federal deputy for São Paulo (2023–present) and mayor of Itapetininga (2017–2022)
- Clarissa Tércio (PE), federal deputy for Pernambuco (2023–present) and state deputy in the Legislative Assembly of Pernambuco (2019–2023)

Republicanos (PRB)

- Daniella Marques (RJ), chairwoman of Caixa Econômica Federal (2022–2023) and special secretary for Productivity, Employment and Competitiveness at the Ministry of Economy
- Damares Alves (DF), senator for the Federal District (2023s–present) and minister of Women, Family and Human Rights (2019–2022)

Podemos (Pode)

- Renata Abreu (SP), federal deputy for São Paulo (2015–present) and national president of Podemos (since 2017)
- Gilson Machado (PE), minister of Tourism (2020–2022) and president of Embratur (2019–2020, 2022–2023)

On 4 August 2026, Republicanos and Podemos followed Progressistas' decision and announced neutrality in the presidential race. As a result, PL will not form any alliance and should select its vice-presidential candidate internally. On the same day, Flavio stated that the decision will be made by 15 August, the deadline for registering candidacies with the Superior Electoral Court.

On 5 August 2026, Flávio Bolsonaro announced Alfredo Gaspar, federal deputy for Alagoas, as his running mate. The choice of Gaspar was seen as a surprise both by the press and by political circles, since he had not appeared on any of the speculated shortlists up to that point.

According to information obtained by the press from campaign insiders, Gaspar's selection was finalized in a rushed and chaotic manner on the final night of party conventions. Gaspar and campaign coordinator Rogério Marinho revealed to journalists on 6 August that Gaspar had already been approached and had accepted the vice-presidential invitation roughly an hour before being officially nominated as PL's Senate candidate for Alagoas, yet he kept the arrangement secret and delivered a normal candidacy speech at his state convention that night. Gaspar only flew to Brasília in the early morning hours, without having received direct confirmation from Flávio himself, and at one point believed the running-mate slot might instead go to Marinho. The decision was only formalized in person by Flávio hours later at campaign headquarters in Brasília, and remained unknown even to the campaign's own communications and marketing staff until shortly before the announcement. Marinho also confirmed that Tereza Cristina and Daniella Marques had previously accepted invitations to join the ticket but failed to secure authorization from their respective parties, forcing the campaign to scramble for an internal PL solution in the final hours before the registration deadline.

== Candidates ==
The following politicians announced their candidacy. The political parties had up to 15 August 2026 to formally register their candidates.

Liberal Party ticket
Flavio Bolsonaro	Alfredo Gaspar
for President	for Vice President
Senator for Rio de Janeiro (2019–present)	Federal deputy for Alagoas (2023–present)

== Endorsements ==
=== Brazilian politicians ===
==== Federal executive officials ====
===== Presidents =====
- Jair Bolsonaro, 38th President of Brazil (2019–2023) and Member of the Chamber of Deputies (1991–2019)
- Michel Temer, 37th President of Brazil (2016-2019) and 24th Vice President of Brazil (2011–2016) (second round)

===== Vice Presidents =====
- Hamilton Mourão 25th Vice President of Brazil (2019-2023) and Senator for Rio Grande do Sul (2023–present)

==== Ministers and executive officials ====
- Aldo Rebelo, Minister of Defence (2015–2016), Minister of Science, Technology and Innovations (2015) and Minister of Sports (2011–2014) (second round)
- Roberto Mangabeira Unger, former Secretary of Strategic Affairs (2007–2009, 2015) (second round)

==== Deputies ====
- Paulo Bilynskyj, Federal Deputy for São Paulo
- Eduardo Bolsonaro, former Federal Deputy for São Paulo
- Eduardo Cunha, former President of the Chamber of Deputies (2015-2016)
- Guilherme Derrite, Federal Deputy for São Paulo
- Deltan Dallagnol, former Federal Deputy for Paraná and former lead prosecutor of Operation Car Wash
- João Rodrigues, former Federal Deputy for Santa Catarina
- Ratinho, former Federal Deputy for Paraná and television presenter
- Nikolas Ferreira, Federal Deputy for Minas Gerais
- Mário Frias, Federal Deputy for São Paulo and actor
- Marcel van Hattem, Federal Deputy for Rio Grande do Sul
- Onyx Lorenzoni, former Federal Deputy for Rio Grande do Sul
- Julia Zanatta, Federal Deputy for Santa Catarina
- Luciano Zucco, Federal Deputy for Rio Grande do Sul

==== Senators ====
- Angelo Coronel, Senator for Bahia
- Alan Rick, Senator for Acre
- Carlos Portinho, Senator for Rio de Janeiro
- Cleitinho Azevedo, Senator for Minas Gerais.
- Carlos Viana, Senator for Minas Gerais
- Ciro Nogueira Lima Filho, Senator for Goias
- Esperidião Amin, Senator for Santa Catarina
- Marcos Pontes, Senator for São Paulo
- Márcio Bittar, Senator for Acre
- Nelson Trad Filho, Senator for Mato Grosso do Sul
- Laercio Oliveira, Senator for Sergipe
- Rogério Simonetti Marinho, Senator for Rio Grande do Norte
- Romário, Senator for Rio de Janeiro and former footballer
- Sergio Moro, Senator for Paraná
- Tereza Cristina, Senator for Mato Grosso do Sul and minister of Agriculture, Livestock and Food Supply (2019–2022)
- Wilder Morais, Senator for Goias

==== Municipal and local officials ====
- Antonio Denarium, former Governor of Roraima
- Álvaro Costa Dias, former Mayor of Natal
- Carlos Bolsonaro, former Councillor of Rio de Janeiro
- Celina Leão, Governor of the Federal District
- Cláudio Castro, former Governor of Rio de Janeiro
- Daniel Santos, Mayor of Ananindeua
- Daniel Vilela, Governor-elect of Goiás (second round)
- Douglas Ruas, President of the Legislative Assembly of Rio de Janeiro
- Eduardo Riedel, Governor of Mato Grosso do Sul
- Eduardo Pimentel, Mayor of Curitiba
- Gladson Cameli, former Governor of Acre
- Jorginho Mello, Governor of Santa Catarina
- João Doria, former Governor of São Paulo (second round)
- Lorenzo Pazolini, Mayor of Vitória, Espírito Santo
- Mailza Gomes, Vice Governor of Acre
- Mateus Simões, Governor of Minas Gerais
- Ricardo Nunes, Mayor of São Paulo
- Reinaldo Azambuja, former Governor of Mato Grosso do Sul
- Ronaldo Caiado, former Governor of Goiás and former president candidate (second round)
- Romeu Zema, former Governor of Minas Gerais and former presidential candidate (second round)
- Tarcísio de Freitas, Governor of São Paulo

==== Other politicians ====
- Augusto Cury, writer, psychiatrist and former presidential candidate (second round)
- Michelle Bolsonaro, former First Lady of Brazil
- Valdemar Costa Neto, President of the Liberal Party

=== International politicians ===
==== Heads of state and government ====
- Abelardo de la Espriella, President of Colombia (2026–present)
- Benjamin Netanyahu, Prime Minister of Israel (1996–1999, 2009–2021, 2022–present)
- Donald Trump, President of the United States (2017–2021, 2025–present)
- Guillermo Lasso, former President of Ecuador (2021–2023)
- Hwang Kyo-ahn, former President of South Korea (2016–2017) and Prime Minister of South Korea (2015–2017)
- Iván Duque, former President of Colombia (2018–2022)
- Javier Milei, President of Argentina (2023–present)
- Jamil Mahuad, former President of Ecuador (1998–2000)
- Jeanine Áñez, former President of Bolivia (2019–2020)
- Jorge Quiroga, former President of Bolivia (2001–2002)
- Juan Guaidó, Interim President of Venezuela (2019–2023)
- Luis Fortuño, former Governor of Puerto Rico (2009–2013)
- Mario Abdo Benítez, former President of Paraguay (2018–2023)
- Mauricio Macri, former President of Argentina (2015–2019)
- Mariano Rajoy, former Prime Minister of Spain (2011–2018)
- Vicente Fox, former President of Mexico (2000–2006)

==== Member of national parliaments ====
- André Ventura, Member of the Assembly of the Republic (2019–present) and president of Chega
- Carlos A. Gimenez, Member of the U.S. House of Representatives from Florida (2021–present)
- Dominik Tarczyński, Member of the Sejm (2015–2020) and Member of the European Parliament (2020–present)
- María Fernanda Cabal, Former member of the Senate of Colombia (2018–2026)
- Patricia Bullrich, National Senator of Argentina (2025–present) and Minister of National Security (2015–2019, 2023–2025)
- Santiago Abascal, Member of the Congress of Deputies (2019–present) and President of the Spanish party Vox (since 2014)

=== Non-political ===
==== Celebrities ====
- Amado Batista, singer
- Ana Castela, songwriter
- Gusttavo Lima, singer
- Leonardo, singer
- Durval Lélys, musician
- R. R. Soares, evangelist
- Silas Malafaia, televangelist
- Netinho, singer
- Penélope Nova, former MTV Brazil VJ

==== Athletes ====
- Dani Alves, former footballer
- Dunga, former footballer and coach (second round)
- Fagner, footballer
- Felipe Melo, footballer
- Felipe Massa, racing driver
- Lúcio, former footballer
- Neymar Jr., footballer
- Renato Gaúcho, former footballer and coach
- Rivaldo, former footballer

==== Public figures ====
- Agustín Laje, Argentine writer and political scientist
- Pablo Marçal, digital influencer
- Luciano Hang, businessman
- Roberto Justus, businessman
- Ricardo Salinas Pliego, Mexican billonarire businessman

=== Organizations ===
==== Political parties ====
- Brazil Union
- Progressistas
- New Party
- Republicans
- Podemos

==== International ====
- La Libertad Avanza

== Police investigation ==
In October 2026, supreme court justice Flávio Dino ordered the police to investigate potential connections between Bolsonaro's presidential campaign and the Rockbridge Network, a United States donor network co-founded by US vice president JD Vance. A political candidate accepting foreign funding or other foreign aid is a crime in Brazil. Rockbridge denied any connection.

== See also ==
- Bolsonarism
- Jair Bolsonaro 2018 presidential campaign
- Jair Bolsonaro 2022 presidential campaign
- Lula da Silva 2026 presidential campaign
- Ronaldo Caiado 2026 presidential campaign
- Brazil–United States diplomatic dispute
