= Ciro Gomes 2022 presidential campaign =

2022 Brazilian elections presidential campaign

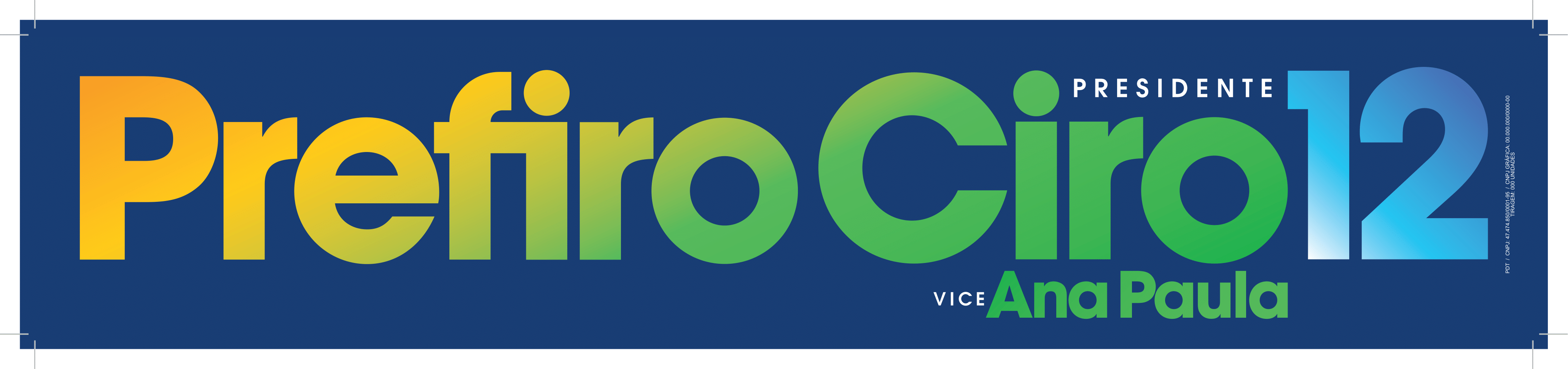
- Campaign: 2022 Brazilian general election
- Candidate: Ciro Gomes; Federal Deputy from Ceará; (2007–2011); Ana Paula Matos; Vice Mayor of Salvador; (2021–present)
- Affiliation: Democratic Labour Party
- Status: Announced: 21 January 2022; Official nominee: 20 July 2022; Official launch: 16 August 2022; Lost election: 2 October 2022
- Key people: João Santana (marketer)
- Slogan: I prefer Ciro

Website
- cirogomes.com.br

The Ciro Gomes 2022 presidential campaign was officialized on 20 July 2022. His running mate was Ana Paula Matos.

== Pre-candidacy ==
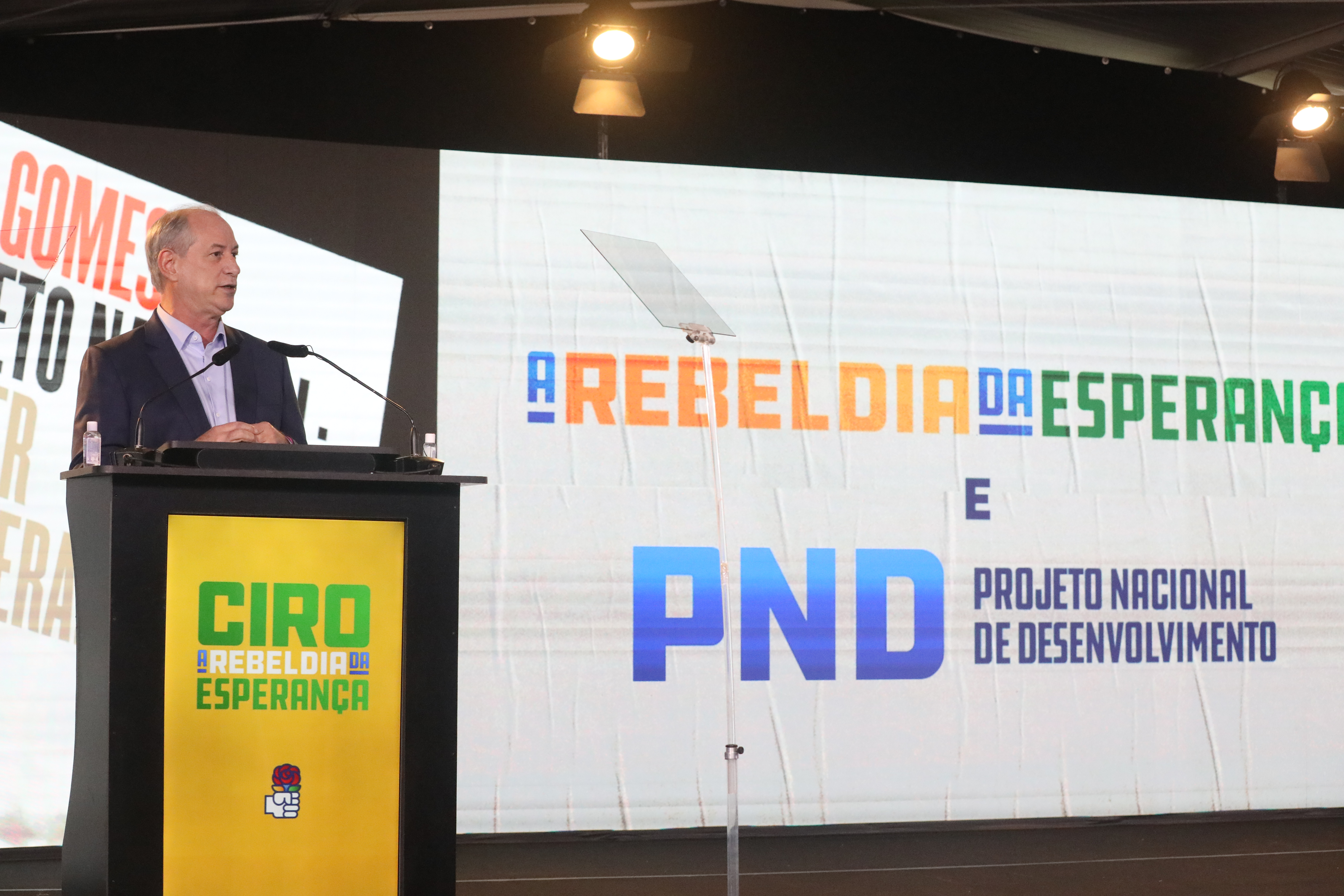
Ciro Gomes announcing his pre-candidacy on 21 January 2022 in Brasília.

On 21 January 2022, Ciro Gomes launched his pre-candidacy for President of Brazil in Brasília. On the event, he supported, among other proposals, the re-industrialization of Brazil and a tax policy to strengthen the State capacity to promp investments outside the debt ceiling.

== Candidate for President ==
The Democratic Labour Party (PDT) approved on 20 July 2022 the candidacy of former governor in the party's national convention in Brasília. Ciro Gomes ran for president for the fourth time. Some of the listed for his running mate were senator Leila Barros (Federal District) and former dean of the University of São Paulo Suely Vieira. On 5 August 2022, the party announced Ana Paula Matos, vice mayor of Salvador, Bahia, as Gomes' running mate.

With João Santana as his marketer, the campaign content gained repercussion due to strong critics as to the Workers' Party and candidate Luiz Inácio Lula da Silva, as to president Jair Bolsonaro.

On the eve of the election, there was a movement on social networks from part of politicians, artists and former allies asking for Ciro to withdraw his candidacy and endorse Lula on the first round, which was refused by the candidate.

Now, in the final stretch of the emptiest campaign in history, they package everything in the false argument of "useful votes". With this preaching, they want to eliminate people's freedom to vote.

— Ciro Gomes in a speech

== Candidates ==
The following politicians announced their candidacy. The political parties had up to 15 August 2022 to formally register their candidates.

Ciro Gomes	Ana Paula Matos
for President	for Vice President
Federal Deputy from Ceará (2007–2011)	Vice Mayor of Salvador (2021–present)

== Election result ==
Ciro Gomes (PDT) vote distribution

Election year	Candidate	Running mate	First round			Second round		
Election year	Candidate	Running mate	# of overall votes	% of overall votes	Position	# of overall votes	% of overall votes	Position
2022	Ciro Gomes	Ana Paula Matos	3,599,287	3.04	Third place	Did not participate		

== See also ==
- Jair Bolsonaro 2022 presidential campaign
- Lula da Silva 2022 presidential campaign
