= Pedro Guimarães =

Pedro Guimarães may refer to:

- Pedro Guimarães (economist), Brazilian economist
- Pedro Guimaraes (soccer) (born 2008), American soccer player
