= Jair Bolsonaro presidential campaign =

Jair Bolsonaro presidential campaign could refer to

- Jair Bolsonaro 2018 presidential campaign
- Jair Bolsonaro 2022 presidential campaign
