= Brazil–United States diplomatic dispute =

- Part of Foreign policy of the second Trump administration
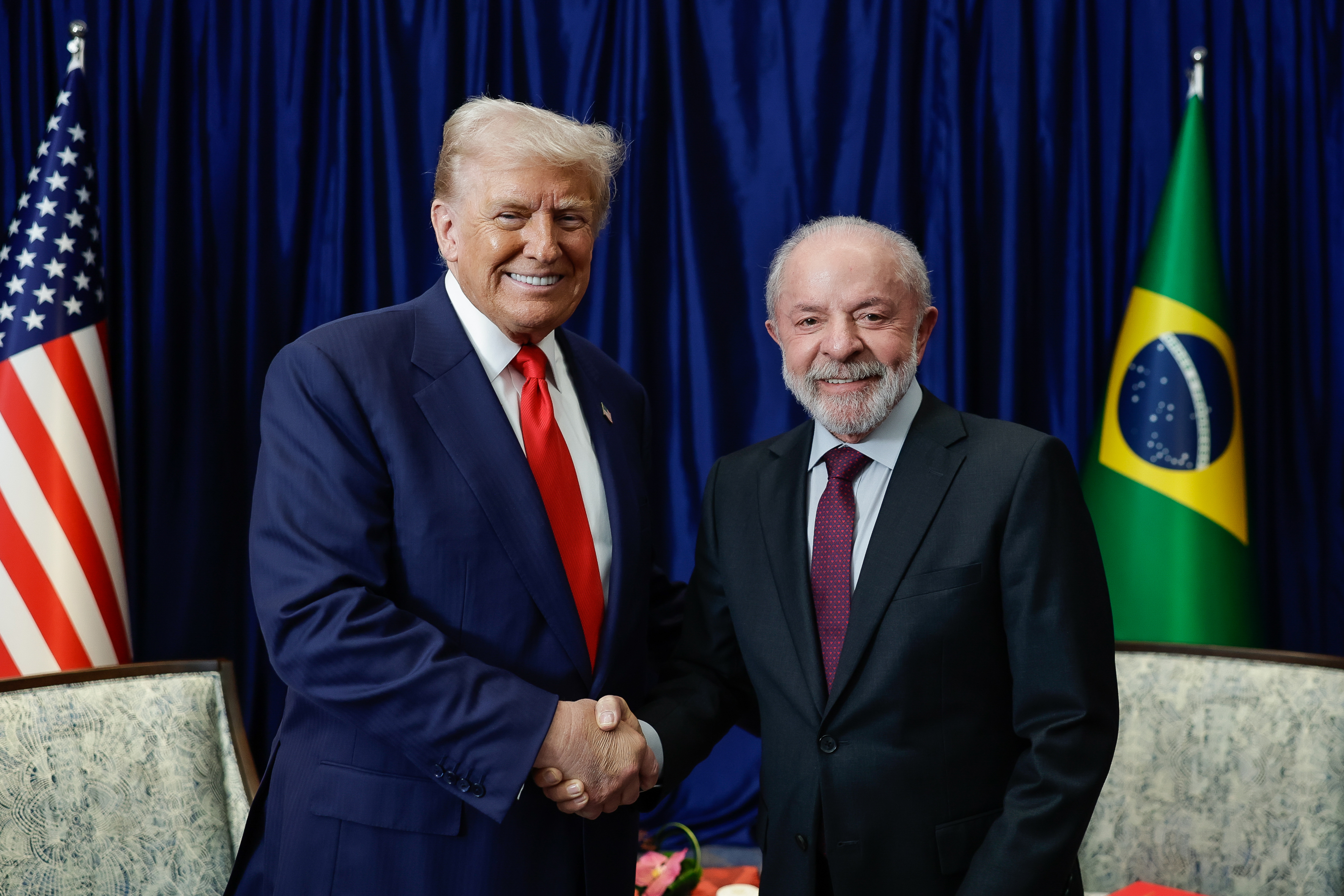
- Brazilian president Luiz Inácio Lula da Silva holds talks with US President Donald Trump in Kuala Lumpur, Malaysia.
- Date: First phase: 9 July – 12 December 2025 (5 months and 3 days); Second phase: Since 28 May 2026 (5 months, 3 weeks and 2 days)
- Caused by: Trial for the 2022–2023 Brazilian coup plot; Alleged unfair trade practices by Brazil
- Status: Ongoing: Imposition of tariffs on Brazilian exports; Application and subsequent removal of the Magnitsky Act against Justice Alexandre de Moraes; Classification of the PCC and CV as foreign terrorist organizations

Parties
Brazil	United States

Lead figures
(Brazil) Lula da Silva; (Brazil) Geraldo Alckmin; (Brazil) Mauro Vieira; (Brazil) Alexandre de Moraes	(United States) Donald Trump; (United States) JD Vance; (United States) Marco Rubio; (Brazil) Flávio Bolsonaro

The Brazil–United States diplomatic dispute is a period of increased tensions between the government of Brazil and the government of the United States that occurs since February 2025, when US president Donald Trump imposed 25% tariffs on steel and aluminum exports from Brazil. The dispute developed with Trump's imposition of a 50 percent tariff on Brazilian goods, as well as imposing the Magnitsky law against Brazilian Supreme Court Justice Alexandre de Moraes, the main judge behind the trial of the individuals involved in the 8 January Brasília attacks, and those involved in a coup plot after Jair Bolsonaro lost the 2022 Brazilian presidential election to Luiz Inácio Lula da Silva.

Other measures included revoking the US visas for 8 of the 11 justices of the Brazilian Supreme Court, officials involved in the program "Mais Médicos" (More Doctors)—a program that brought Cuban doctors to Brazil—including Brazilian Health minister Alexandre Padilha, as well as other Brazilian political figures. The Trump administration also targeted the Pix instant payment system managed by the Brazilian Central Bank, and also investigated accusations of piracy at the Rua 25 de Março (March 25th Street). It also looked into Brazil's role in BRICS.

In May 2026, United States Department of State declared Comando Vermelho (CV) and Primeiro Comando da Capital (PCC) as terrorist groups, following talks with Eduardo Bolsonaro, and Trump expressed support for Flávio Bolsonaro during 2026 Brazilian presidential election.

== History ==
=== Background ===
The US has run trade surpluses with Brazil since 2007, reaching $253 million in 2024. Nonetheless, Trump criticized the country as a "tremendous tariff maker" and pledged tariffs on its exports. Brazilian president Luiz Inácio Lula da Silva vowed to reciprocate. However, following Trump's 25% tariffs on steel and aluminum, Brazilian Institutional Affairs Minister Alexandre Padilha stated that Brazil would not retaliate.

On April 2, 2025, Donald Trump imposed the base 10% tariff on Brazil. The reaction from Brazilian exporters was mixed. Coffee exporters saw an opportunity to send more robusta beans to the US due to international rivals being initially hit with heavier charges, while other companies, such as Embraer, worried over rising complexity and costs for their US customers.

On April 3, 2025, Brazil's government stated that it would explore options including involving the World Trade Organization. The Brazilian National Congress passed a "Trade Reciprocity Law", enabling the government to respond to potential unilateral trade measures imposed against Brazilian goods and services. By May 2025, according to statements released by Brazilian Finance Minister Fernando Haddad, Brazil and the United States were negotiating the terms of an understanding on tariffs.

On July 9, 2025, Trump announced that the United States would impose a 50% tariff on Brazilian goods. He criticized the criminal prosecution of former Brazilian president Jair Bolsonaro, accused Brazil of being an unfair trading partner, and claimed the tariff was still less than what the U.S. needed for a "level playing field"—despite the US trade surplus with Brazil. This led to comparisons with federal prosecution of Donald Trump involving the scandal with Stormy Daniels, and Trump's eligibility after January 6 United States Capitol attack versus Bolsonaro's ineligibility after 8 January Brasília attacks. Several transnational newspapers, such as The Guardian and The New York Times, published articles pointing to growing Brazilian sovereignty and democracy.

In November 2026, Trump included Brazil in a list of restrictions for AI chips, such as Nvidia's, as a way to curb China's access. The list includes Singapore, Thailand, Malaysia, and Indonesia with risks to divert these chips to China, requiring a US export license for shipments of covered chips to those countries. The announcement comes just days after Jensen Huang's resignation at the helm of Nvidia, one of the largest chip makers used in artificial intelligence, and the American company. The executive stepped down a week later after revelations about his alleged extramarital relationship with Alice Huang, a former Singaporean company executive investigated on suspicion of facilitating Chinese access to American technologies. The scandal has widened pressure on President Trump's administration to bolster enforcement on the sale of advanced chips. American officials are being criticized for alleged flaws in combating Nvidia component smuggling and controlling access by Chinese companies to overseas data centers.

=== Tariff dispute ===
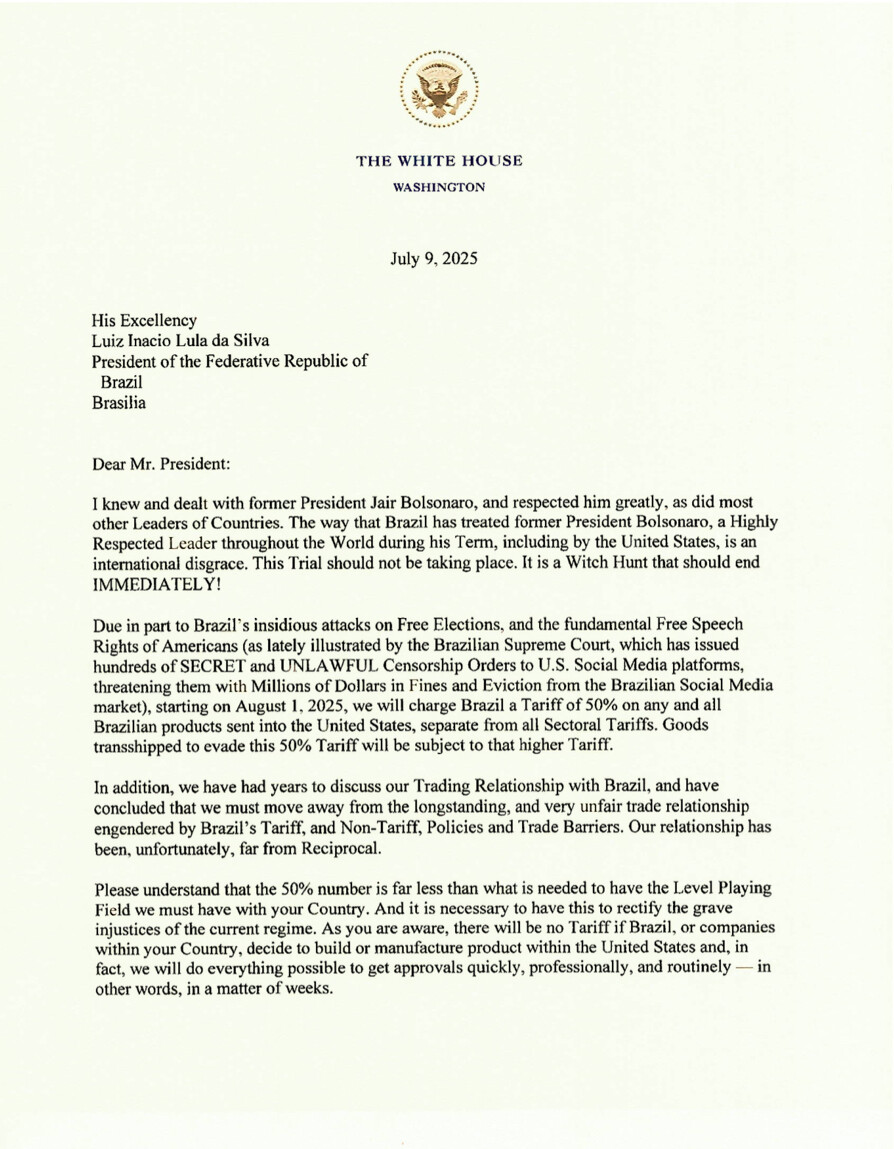
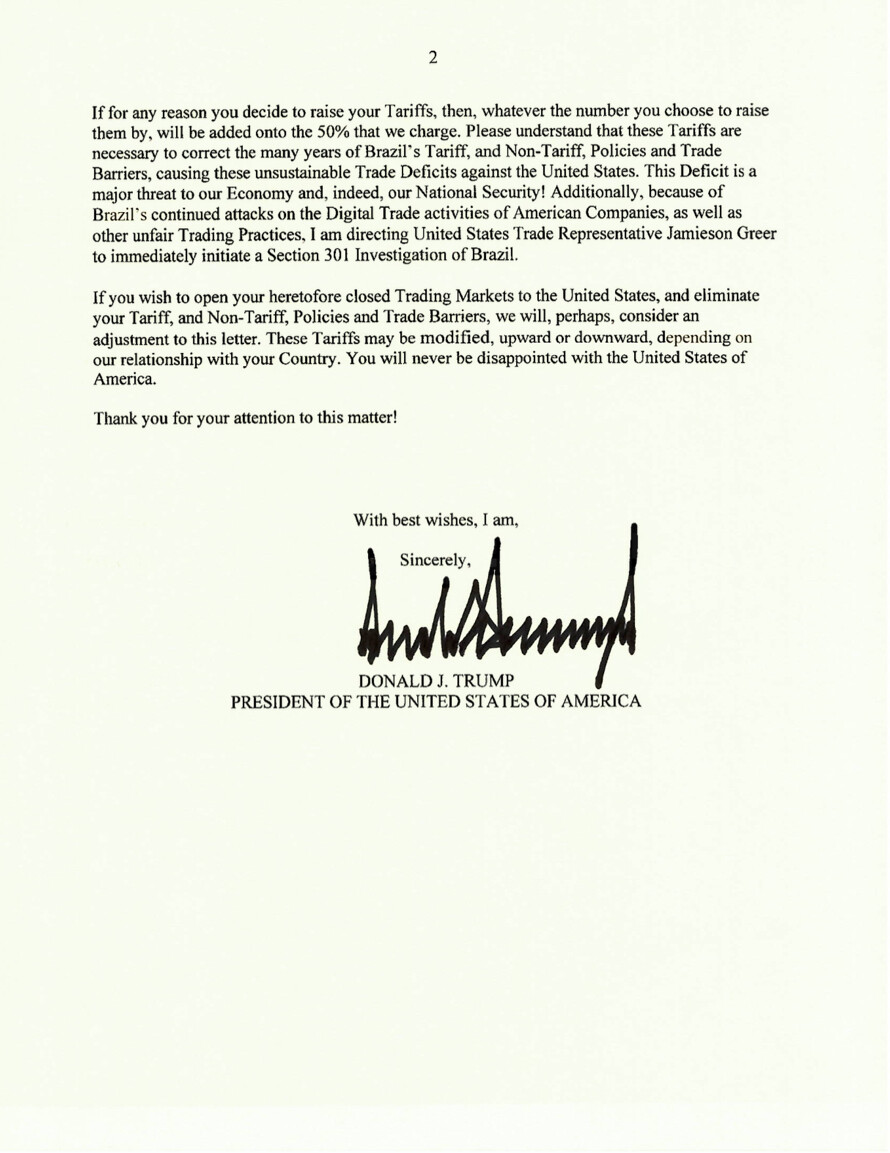
Trump letter to Lula

In a letter to Brazil on July 9, 2025, Trump threatened a 50% tariff while denouncing charges against Jair Bolsonaro, an ally facing trial for the 2022 Brazilian coup plot. On July 30, Trump declared Brazil’s actions a US "national emergency" and imposed an additional 40% tariff on top of a 10% baseline tariff, for a total tariff rate of 50%. The order exempted several Brazilian exports, notably airplanes, aeronautical components, iron ore, aluminum, natural gas, orange juice, fertilizers, petroleum and lumber. Other main Brazilian exports were not exempted.

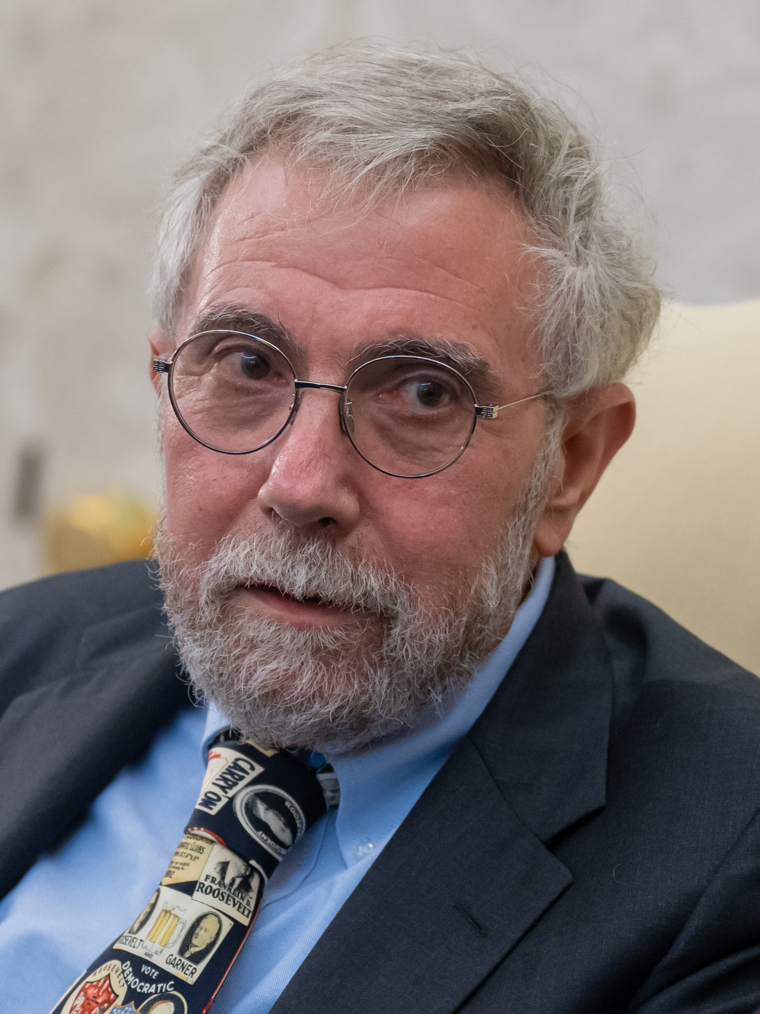
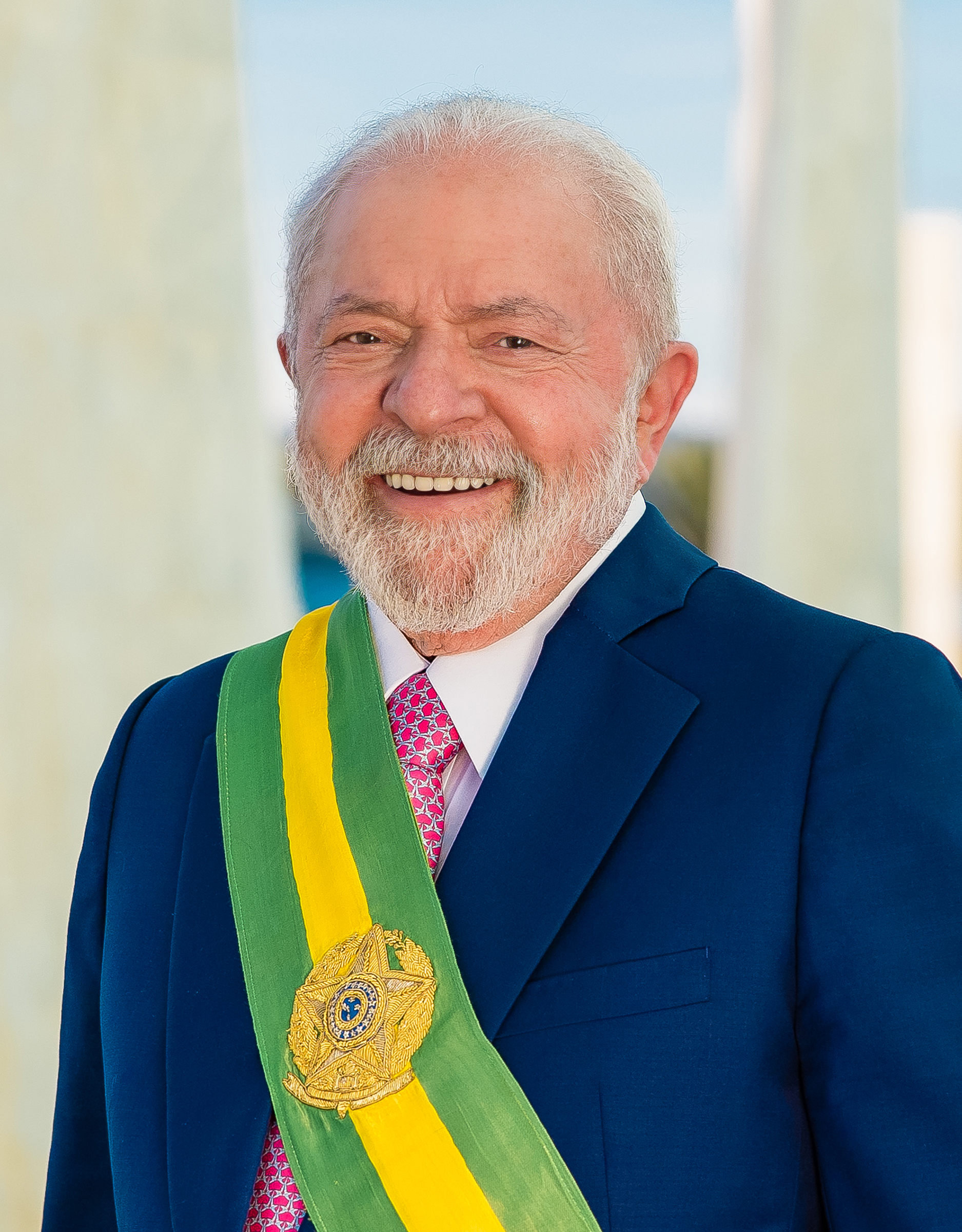
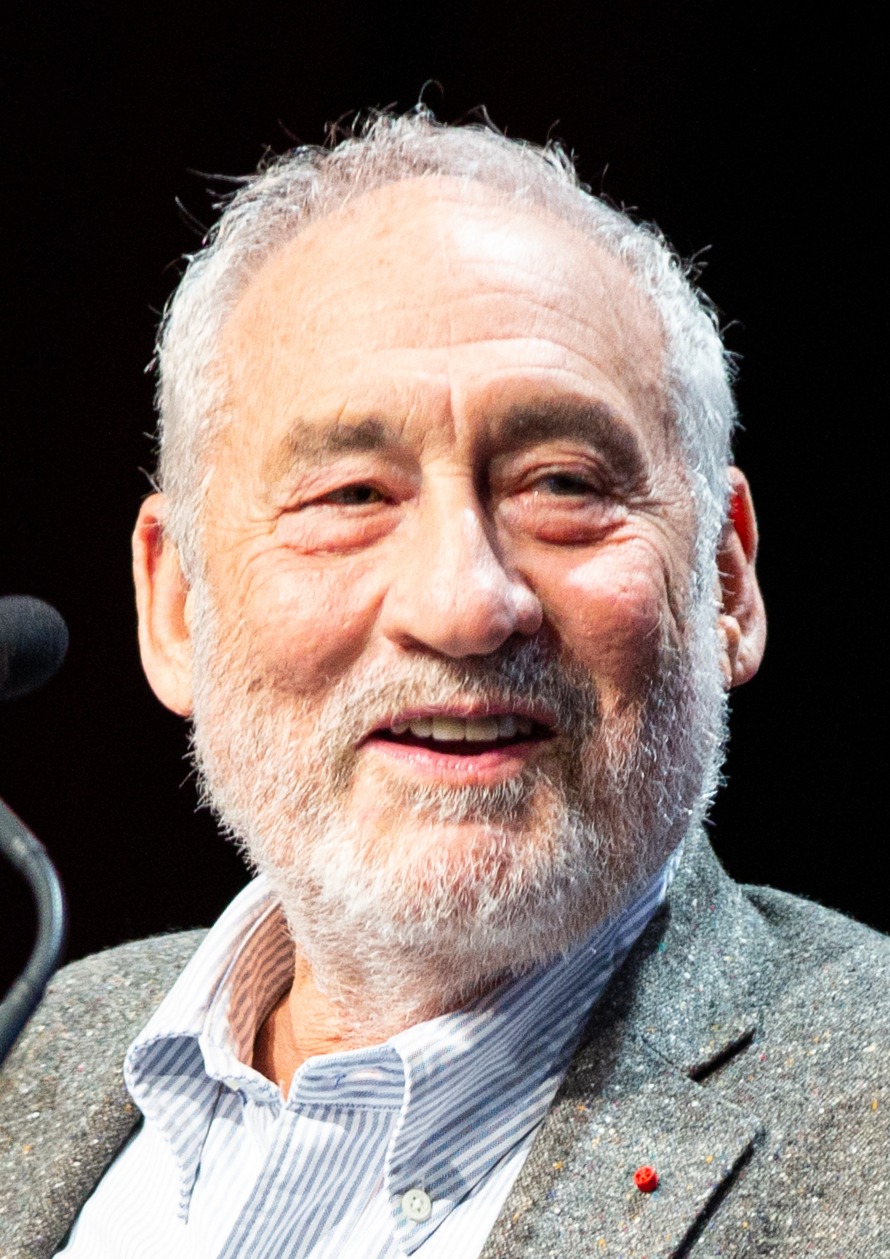
Paul Krugman (left) criticized Donald Trump's tariff on Brazilian goods, arguing it was meant to help "another wannabe dictator", while the stance of Luiz Inácio Lula da Silva (center) was praised by Joseph Stiglitz (right), who stated the Brazilian president stood up to Trump and "has defended his country's sovereignty".

Nobelist Paul Krugman criticized the tariff, stating that the tariff was reason enough to impeach the president. Fellow Nobelist Joseph Stiglitz stated that Brazilian president Luiz Inácio Lula da Silva, by refusing to submit to US intimidation, had "defended his country's sovereignty" in trade and in the regulation of American-controlled tech platforms. In the aftermath of the announcement, Brazilians adopted the phrase Trump Always Chickens Out (TACO) to mock the American president; the acronym became one of the seven most-used terms on X that week.

In August 2025, China authorized 183 Brazilian companies to export coffee under a five-year agreement, aiming to boost imports amid rising domestic demand. The move followed the US imposition of a 50% coffee tariff covering about 30% of US imports. Prices rose sharply for American roasters.

Faced with the tariffs, Lula attempted to diversify Brazil’s international partnerships and strengthening BRICS. In November 2025, Trump signed Executive Order 14361, "Modifying the Scope of Tariffs on the Government of Brazil", which exempts coffee, beef and certain other agricultural imports from the 40% tariff on imports from Brazil. On November 24, 2025, The New York Times published an article stating that "Brazil defied Trump and won", and that, five months after Trump's "furious letter", the American president "had pretty much admitted defeat" when he merely called the arrest of Jair Bolsonaro "a pity". The piece also argued that Luiz Inácio Lula da Silva came out of the episode "politically stronger" than when he entered.

On 17 September 2026, O Estado de S. Paulo revealed that, on 16 October 2025, the United States government attempted to impose a list of 21 demands on Brazil in exchange for removing the 50% tariff: These included, among other demands, a demand to free "political dissidents" (a thinly-veiled reference to Jair Bolsonaro), demands for unilateral commercial concessions and a demand for Brazil to not apply sanctions on U.S. citizens. These demands were considered unacceptable by the Brazilian government. On 9 January 2026, the United States government reduced the number of demands to 14, but these were also rejected. New negotiations started in late August 2026, and are expected to continue on 30 September 2026 at a G20 Ministerial meeting in Milwaukee, United States.

==== Pix dispute ====
In July 2025, the Office of the United States Trade Representative (USTR) launched an investigation focused on electronic payment services, preferential tariffs, and anti-corruption interference by Brazil. It alleged unfair advantaging of Brazilian payment service Pix over US competitors, such as Visa Inc. and Mastercard. Lula accused Trump of being "bothered by Pix" because it "will put an end to credit cards". Lula's administration has planned to launch a "massive" media campaign in defense of Pix, with the slogan "O Pix é do Brasil" [The Pix is Brazil's], in an effort to associate the system with national sovereignty.

Members of the Brazilian government accused the investigation of being born of lobbying by U.S. credit card companies and big tech firms. Economist Paul Krugman accused the U.S. of being pressured by the financial sector into the investigation. According to Fundação Getulio Vargas finance professor Fabio Gallo, Pix is inspiring other countries to develop their own solutions, thereby weakening the dollar and threatening the "end of the Western financial monopoly", in which the U.S. is no longer able to track, tax, or block transactions. Opinion polls indicate a 92% approval rating for the payment system among Brazilians. Furthermore, proposed alterations (flexibilização) to the system in response to United States pressure have faced significant opposition. A survey conducted before the imposition of tariffs found that 72% of the population favored maintaining the current system without changes, despite the threat of US tariffs.

On 15 July 2026, following the conclusion of the USTR investigation, the Trump administration imposed 25% tariffs on a range of Brazilian imports.

On 3 August 2026, Pix launched in 8 new countries: Argentina, Chile, France, Paraguay, Portugal, Spain, the United States, and Uruguay.

=== Trump administration sanctions ===
I understand that for American culture it is harder to grasp the fragility of democracy because there has never been a coup there. [...] But Brazil had years of dictatorship under [President Getúlio] Vargas, another 20 years of military dictatorship and innumerable coup attempts. When you're much more attacked by a disease, you form tougher antibodies, and you seek out a preventive vaccine.

— Justice Moraes to The Washington Post

On 18 July 2025, after authorizing an operation against Jair Bolsonaro, who was required to wear an electronic tag and be confined to his home at night and on weekends, Alexandre de Moraes was attacked by the Trump administration over his visa. The decision was announced by Secretary of State Marco Rubio and would have consequences for Moraes's family and "allies". According to Rubio, "the political prosecution of Brazilian judge Alexandre de Moraes against Jair Bolsonaro has created a complex of persecution and censorship so widespread that it not only violates the fundamental rights of Brazilians, but also transcends Brazil's borders and targets Americans." The American diplomat concluded the text by stating that he "ordered the immediate suspension of the visas of Alexandre de Moraes and his allies, as well as those of their immediate family members."

On 30 July 2025, Moraes was added to the sanctions list established by the US government under the Magnitsky Act, despite the fact that he has no accounts, investments, or assets in the US. As a result, the minister might even have difficulty receiving his salary, despite being paid by Banco do Brasil. Despite being a Brazilian institution, the bank maintains operational and financial ties to the international system, which could lead to certain services being restricted to avoid fines.

The leader of the campaign for the passage of the Magnitsky Act, Bill Browder, criticized the sanction against Moraes, calling it a "shameful moment" and stating the judge does not fit the criteria for such a measure, and claimed that the situation is the "first clear abuse" of Magnitsky. Browder argued Trump was attempting to address domestic political issues through legislation, while ignoring that the Magnitsky Act was meant to punish human rights abuses. Transparency International also criticized the application of the Magnitsky Act to Moraes, calling it "alarming and unacceptable", viewing it as politically motivated and warning of the risk of institutional instability in Brazil due to such "interference by a foreign government" that disrespects "national sovereignty and the separation of powers". The American non-governmental organization Human Rights First stated the enforcement of the Magnitsky Act shows Trump is seeking "impunity for close political allies"; according to a senior director of the organization, Trump would be willing to start a trade war and other "extreme" measures to protect Bolsonaro from proceedings related to the 8 January coup d'état attempt.

British magazine The Economist criticized the American decision, stating they were overreacting and highlighting the unprecedented nature of applying the Magnitsky Act in this case, arguing that it could backfire. According to the article, the measure would strengthen Luiz Inácio Lula da Silva's narrative that Bolsonaro and his allies are "traitors" to the nation. The Economist also noted Moraes acts within Brazilian law and portrayed the justice as "unshakable" in the face of pressure—having flown to São Paulo to watch a match of his team on the very same day the sanctions were announced. According to Fundação Getulio Vargas researcher and Ibmec professor Leonardo Paz Neves, the sanction against Moraes was a strategy by Trump to once again avoid the expression "Trump Always Chickens Out", since on the same day a decree was published listing nearly 700 items exempted from the tariff hike on Brazilian goods.

On 1 August, during the reopening session of the Supreme Federal Court, Moraes declared the Magnitsky Act would be ignored in his case and that he would remain the rapporteur of the criminal case regarding the coup d'état attempt in Brazil. Justices Luís Roberto Barroso and Gilmar Mendes also criticized the sanction and defended their colleague. Moraes stated that "pseudo-patriotic Brazilians" act "in a cowardly and treacherous manner" with the aim of subjecting the functioning of the Supreme Court "to the scrutiny of a foreign state", adding that these individuals "think they are dealing with people of their own kind, also militia members". On 4 August, justice Edson Fachin declared the application of the Magnitsky Act represents "undue interference" and a "threat" to judicial independence.

In an interview to The Washington Post, Moraes said: "we'll do what's right" and expressed his admiration for the constitutional history of the United States, but remained firm in upholding judicial decisions. He defends the legitimacy of his actions, stating that there is no need for adjustments in his conduct or in the way he carries out his work, and argued that the "accelerated pace of certain processes", such as the criminal action involving the coup plot, is justified by the presence of defendants in prison.

On 28 August, The Economist praised the Brazilian judiciary's performance in the Jair Bolsonaro case and highlighted the Donald Trump administration's numerous recent actions against Brazil in an attempt to free the "Trump of the Tropics" (Bolsonaro) from prosecution. Among the actions against the country, the newspaper highlighted the imposition of 50% tariffs on Brazilian products and the application of the Magnitsky Act against Minister Alexandre de Moraes. It concluded:

"Brazil offers a lesson in democracy for an America that is becoming more corrupt, protectionist, and authoritarian. [...] This recalls an ugly bygone era when the United States habitually destabilised Latin American countries. Fortunately, Mr Trump's interference is likely to backfire. [...] Unlike their counterparts in the United States, many of Brazil's mainstream politicians from all parties want to play by the rules and make progress through reform. Those are the hallmarks of political maturity. Temporarily at least, the role of the Western hemisphere's democratic adult has moved south."

On 12 December 2025, the US government lifted the sanctions it placed on Moraes and his wife.

==== United States Department of State report ====
On 12 August 2025, the Trump administration stated that the human rights situation in Brazil had deteriorated and accused the Judiciary of adopting measures that would undermine freedom of expression. Published by the United States Department of State, the report—which assesses the human rights situation worldwide—specifically named justice Alexandre de Moraes: "Court records reveal that he personally ordered the suspension of more than 100 user accounts on the social media platform X (formerly Twitter), disproportionately suppressing the speech of supporters of former president Jair Bolsonaro, instead of adopting narrower measures to penalize content that incited imminent illegal action or harassment".

The same report, which also mentioned a deterioration of human rights in South Africa, ignored the anti-democratic efforts of Hungary's government, omitted the humanitarian crisis in the Gaza Strip caused by Israel, and softened its tone on Nayib Bukele's El Salvador, ignoring accusations of human rights violations in that country. Critics claimed it was politically motivated; among them, former Department of State official Josh Paul, who noted that the document "demonstrates what happens when political agendas take precedence over facts". The previous year's report had found no significant changes in the human rights situation in either Brazil or South Africa. Established democracies in Europe were also criticized in this report by the Trump administration; according to the document, France and Germany had "credible reports of serious restrictions on freedom of expression".

The non-governmental organization Human Rights Watch accused the United States government of political manipulation and lies in the document; according to the organization, by ignoring violations in allied countries, there was an "exercise in cover-up and deception", turning the report into "a weapon that makes autocrats appear palatable and downplays the abuses that occur in those places". Human Rights Watch considered that the 2025 edition of the document undermined its credibility, also accusing Trump of manipulation in the case of Brazil.

=== Red Command and PCC ===
On June 1, 2026, the United States Trade Representative announced the conclusion of the investigation into Brazilian commercial practices considered unfair to American interests. As a result of the investigation, it was proposed the application of 25% tariffs on Brazilian goods. The agency included a list of exceptions for products considered strategic by the U.S., such as meat, fruit, coffee, aircraft, rare earths, among others. Before they came into effect, a series of public consultations must be held.

On May 26, 2026, the senator and presidential candidate Flávio Bolsonaro had a series of meetings with Donald Trump, JD Vance and Marco Rubio. During the meetings the senator asked that the U.S. not apply fees to Brazilian companies. The senator also requested that the criminal organizations Red Command and First Command of the Capital be designated as foreign terrorist organizations by the US. According to Flávio Bolsonaro, Donald Trump replied that he would analyze this classification. And, in May 28, the U.S. Department of State published the designation, generating speculation of possible military action or foreign intervention.

The U.S. government has again attacked Pix, saying it is a public system that favors Brazil over American companies such as Visa and Mastercard. In the midst of the crisis, Flávio Bolsonaro, who became known on social media as "Tariflávio", said he had asked Trump to back down from taxes, while his brother, Eduardo Bolsonaro, suggested the adoption of the American private system Zelle as an alternative, generating strong controversy and accusations of "vassage" and subordination to foreign interests. After the repercussion, the former deputy denied having suggested replacement of the Pix.

== See also ==
- 2025 in Brazil
- Brazil–United States relations
- Liberation Day tariffs
- Second presidency of Lula da Silva
- Tariffs in the second Trump administration
- Flávio Bolsonaro 2026 presidential campaign
- 2025–2026 Canada–United States trade war
- 2025–2026 Mexico–United States trade war
- China–United States trade war
