= Ricardo Guidi =

Brazilian politician (born 1977)

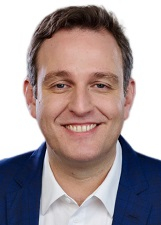
- Guidi in 2024

Member of the Chamber of Deputies
- Incumbent
- Assumed office 1 February 2019
- Constituency: Santa Catarina

Member of the Legislative Assembly of Santa Catarina
- In office 1 February 2015 – 1 February 2019
- Constituency: At-large

Personal details
- Born: Ricardo Zanatta Guidi; 28 September 1977 (age 49) Criciúma, Santa Catarina, Brazil
- Party: PL (2024–present)
- Other political affiliations: PPS (2014–2018); PSD (2018–2024)
- Relatives: Julia Zanatta (cousin)
- Education: Fundação Getulio Vargas

Ricardo Zanatta Guidi (born 28 September 1977) is a Brazilian politician serving as a member of the Chamber of Deputies since 2019. From 2015 to 2019, he was a member of the Legislative Assembly of Santa Catarina.
