= Daniella Marques =

Brazilian economist

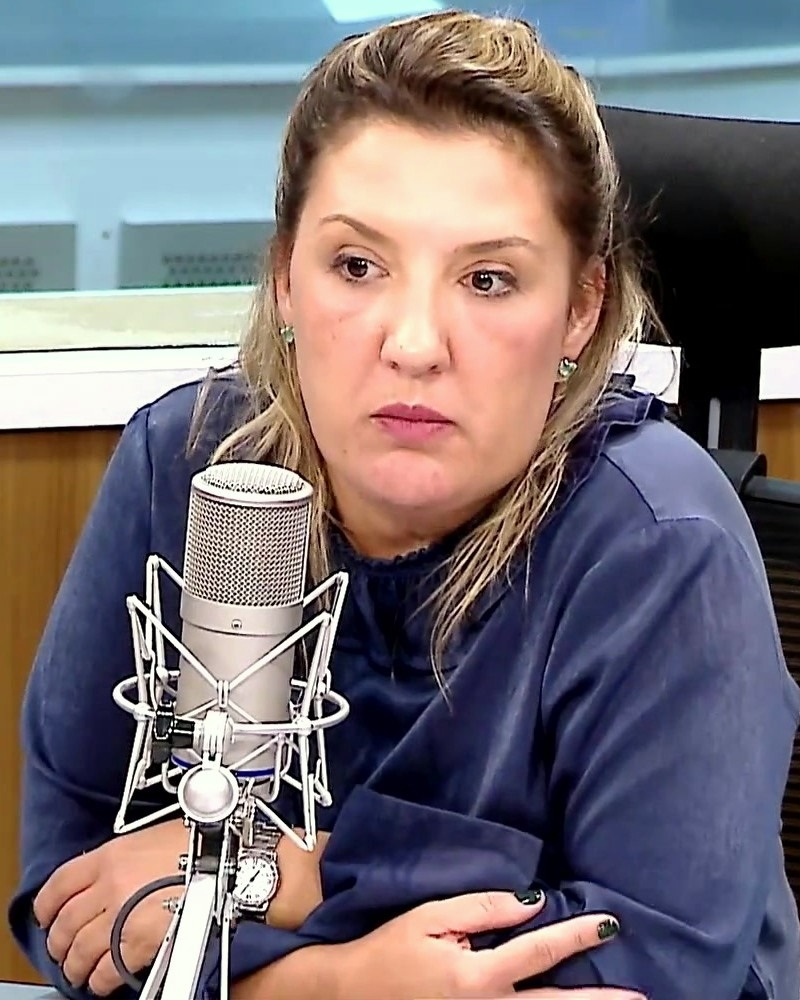

Chairwoman of Caixa Econômica Federal
- In office 1 July 2022 – 9 January 2023
- President: Jair Bolsonaro
- Preceded by: Pedro Guimarães
- Succeeded by: Maria Rita Serrano

Personal details
- Born: Daniella Marques Consentino; 16 October 1979 (age 47) Barra Mansa, Rio de Janeiro, Brazil
- Education: Pontifical Catholic University of Rio de Janeiro
- Occupation: Economist

Daniella Marques Consentino (born 16 October 1979) is a Brazilian administration graduate. She was part of the economic team of president Jair Bolsonaro until 29 June 2022, when she was nominated as chairwoman of the state-owned Caixa Econômica Federal. She became the bank's chairwoman on 5 July 2022, replacing Pedro Guimaraes. She was discharged by president Luiz Inácio Lula da Silva in January 2023.

Government offices
Preceded by Pedro Guimarães	Chairwoman of Caixa Econômica Federal; 2022–2023	Succeeded by Maria Rita Serrano
