= Lula da Silva 2022 presidential campaign =

2022 Brazilian elections presidential campaign

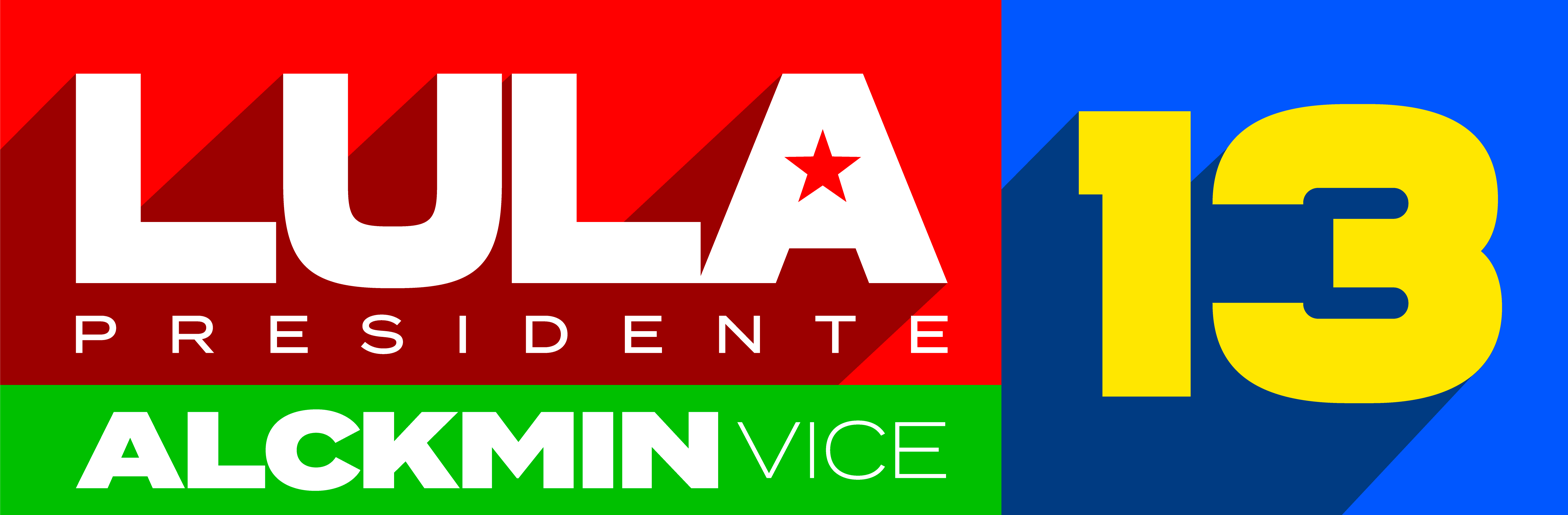
- Campaign: 2022 Brazilian general election
- Candidate: Luiz Inácio Lula da Silva; 35th President of Brazil; (2003–2010); Geraldo Alckmin; 60th Governor of São Paulo; (2011–2018)
- Affiliation: Brazil of Hope; Coalition partners: PSOL REDE Federation; Brazilian Socialist Party; Solidarity; Avante; Agir; Republican Party of the Social Order
- Status: Announced: 7 March 2022; Official nominee: 21 July 2022; Official launch: 16 August 2022; Qualified for run-off: 2 October 2022; Won election: 30 October 2022
- Key people: Gleisi Hoffmann (campaign chairwoman); Paulo Okamotto (chief coordinator); Jaques Wagner (political strategist); José Guimarães (political strategist); Wellington Dias (political strategist); Márcio Macêdo (treasurer)
- Slogan: Let's go together for Brazil

Website
- lula.com.br

Former president Luiz Inácio Lula da Silva's presidential campaign was officially approved on 21 July 2022 in São Paulo. His running mate is former governor of São Paulo Geraldo Alckmin. Lula was elected in 2002 for the first term and re-elected in 2006 for the second term and is a candidate for tri-election for the third term, after his successors, former president Dilma Rousseff, having been elected in 2010 for the first term and re-elected in 2014 for the second term and former mayor of São Paulo, Fernando Haddad, having been defeated in 2018.

== Pre-candidacy ==
On 20 May 2021, in an interview to French magazine Paris Match, Lula confirmed that he was pre-candidate for the next year elections.

The Workers' Party national committee, on 13 April 2022, approved the nomination of former governor of São Paulo Geraldo Alckmin (PSB) for Vice President. The ticket was officialized on 7 May, in a coalition formed by the Brazil of Hope Federation (formed by Workers' Party, Communist Party of Brazil and Green Party), Brazilian Socialist Party, Solidarity and PSOL REDE Federation. With the withdrawal of André Janones on 4 August, the ticket received official support of Avante and Agir.

== Candidacy for President ==
The Workers' Party approved on 21 July 2022 the candidacy of former President Lula in the party's national convention. Lula ran for President for the sixth time, his third term and the first candidate for President as member of a partisan federation. This modality of alliance was created in 2021.

== Political positions ==
=== Abortion ===
On 4 April 2022, having said "madam can get an abortion in Paris, go to Berlin, look for a good clinic", and openly defended that "'it should be made a public health issue and everyone has the right". In a letter to Brazilian evangelicals, Lula stated that he is "personally against abortion," but that abortion policy "is not an issue to be decided by the President of the Republic, but by Congress".

=== Education ===
On 21 October 2022, Lula promised the return of the government funding for private university students.

=== Environment ===
In his first days of government, Lula will seek to convene an international climate conference in Brazil with other global leaders, to regain trust in the face of global public and political opinion, and to present his new plans for the protection of the Amazon rainforest, as the return of the Amazon Fund, of approximately $3 billion reais together with Germany and Norway.

=== Foreign policy ===
On 29 October 2022, in an article written for the French newspaper Le Monde, Lula said that Brazil will return to its leading role in the international stage, especially in the fields of the environment and renewable energies, Lula will also continue to claim a permanent seat for Brazil in the UN Security Council. In his government program, Lula reinforced the return of cooperation with the nations of Latin America, the Caribbean and Africa, in addition to strengthening the relationship with Mercosur, Unasur, Celac and the BRICS.

He will also seek to formalize a Brazil-European Union strategic partnership, to serve as a counterweight to a "possible new cold war" between the United States and China.

=== Health ===
On 17 October 2022, Lula promised to reinforce the budget of the Ministry of Health and the Brazilian Unified Health System, known as SUS, in addition to reduce to zero the queues for consultations and exams, affected by the pressure caused by the COVID-19 pandemic in Brazil.

=== Infrastructure ===
On 10 September 2022, Lula promised the return of the Growth Acceleration Program, better known as PAC, and the Minha Casa Minha Vida program, to accelerate economic growth and creation of jobs through public investment.

== Endorsements ==
=== Brazilian Politicians ===
==== Former Presidents ====
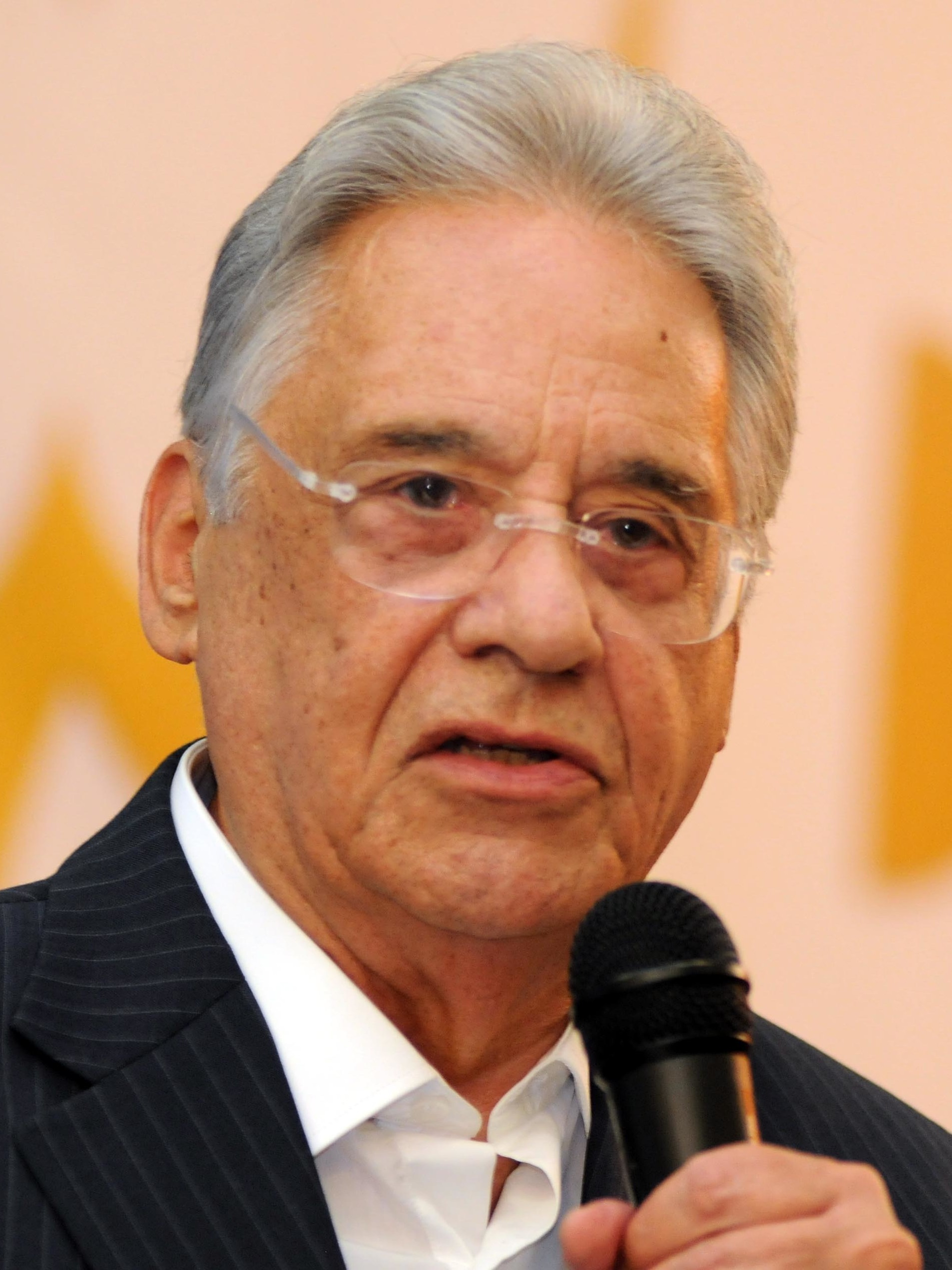
Fernando Henrique Cardoso

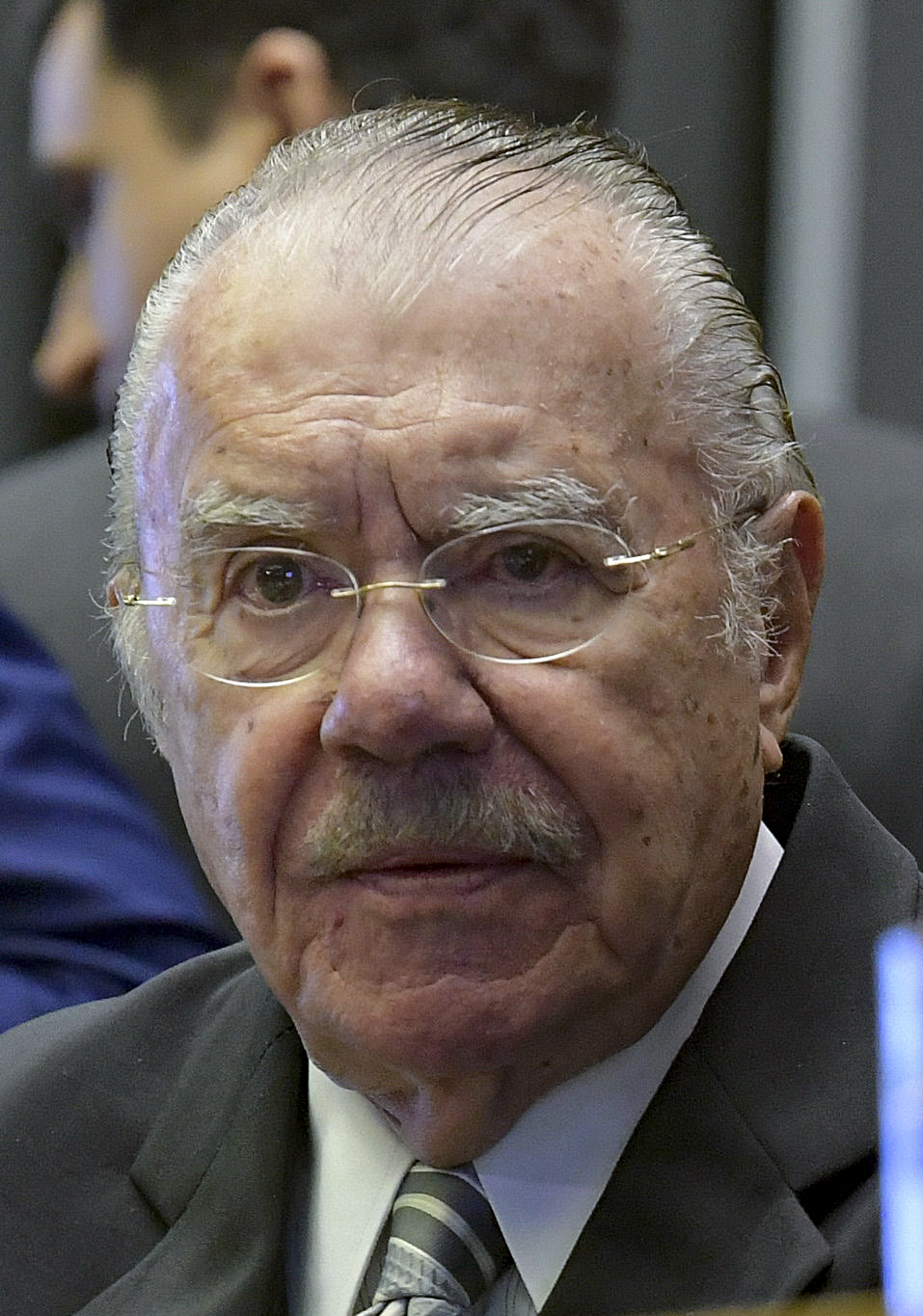
José Sarney

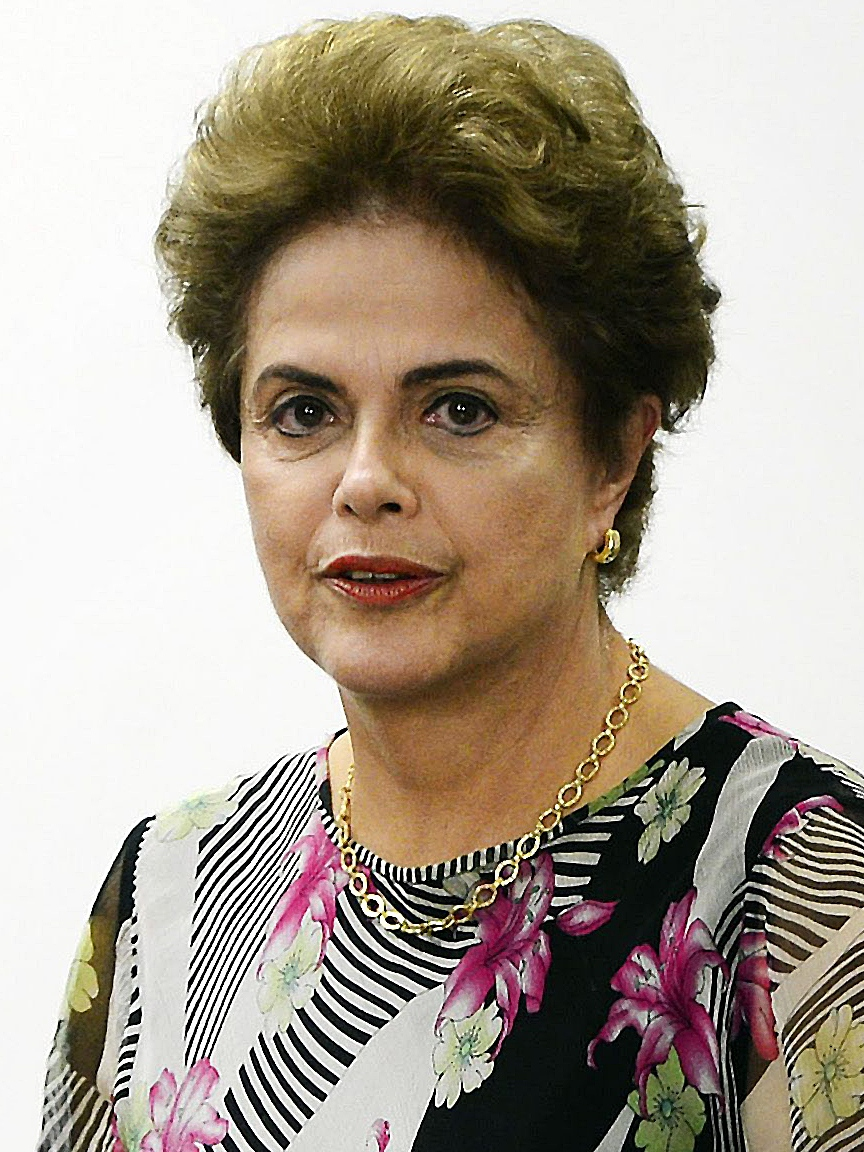
Dilma Rousseff

- Dilma Rousseff, 36th President of Brazil (2011–2016)
- Fernando Henrique Cardoso, 34th President of Brazil (1995–2003) (second round)
- José Sarney, 31st President of Brazil (1985–1990) & 20th Vice President of Brazil (1985) (second round)

==== Senators ====
- Alessandro Vieira, Senator for Sergipe
- José Serra, Senator for São Paulo, former Governor of São Paulo, and former Mayor of São Paulo (second round)
- Kátia Abreu, Senator for Tocantins and 2018 vice presidential candidate (second round)
- Marina Silva, former senator for Acre and former Ministry of the Environment
- Simone Tebet, Senator for Mato Grosso do Sul and 2022 presidential candidate (second round)
- Omar Aziz, Senator for Amazonas
- Tasso Jereissati, Senator for Ceará (second round)

==== Deputies ====
- Alexandre Frota, Federal Deputy from São Paulo (second round)
- Renan Calheiros, Senator for Alagoas and former president of the Federal Senate
- Rodrigo Maia, former President of the Chamber of Deputies

==== Governors and Mayors ====
- Helder Barbalho, Governor of Pará (second round)
- Fátima Bezerra, Governor of Rio Grande do Norte
- Eduardo Braga, Senator for Amazonas
- Carlos Brandão, Governor of Maranhão
- Ciro Gomes, former governor of Ceará and 2022 Presidential Candidate (second round)
- César Maia, former mayor of Rio de Janeiro
- Eduardo Paes, Mayor of Rio de Janeiro (second round)

==== Others ====
- Ayres Britto, former Justice of the Supreme Federal Court of Brazil
- Joaquim Barbosa, former Justice of the Supreme Federal Court of Brazil
- Leonardo Péricles, 2022 Presidential Candidate (second round)
- Roberto Freire, former Minister of Culture (second round)
- Sofia Manzano, President of Brazilian Communist Party and 2022 presidential candidate (second round)

=== International politicians ===
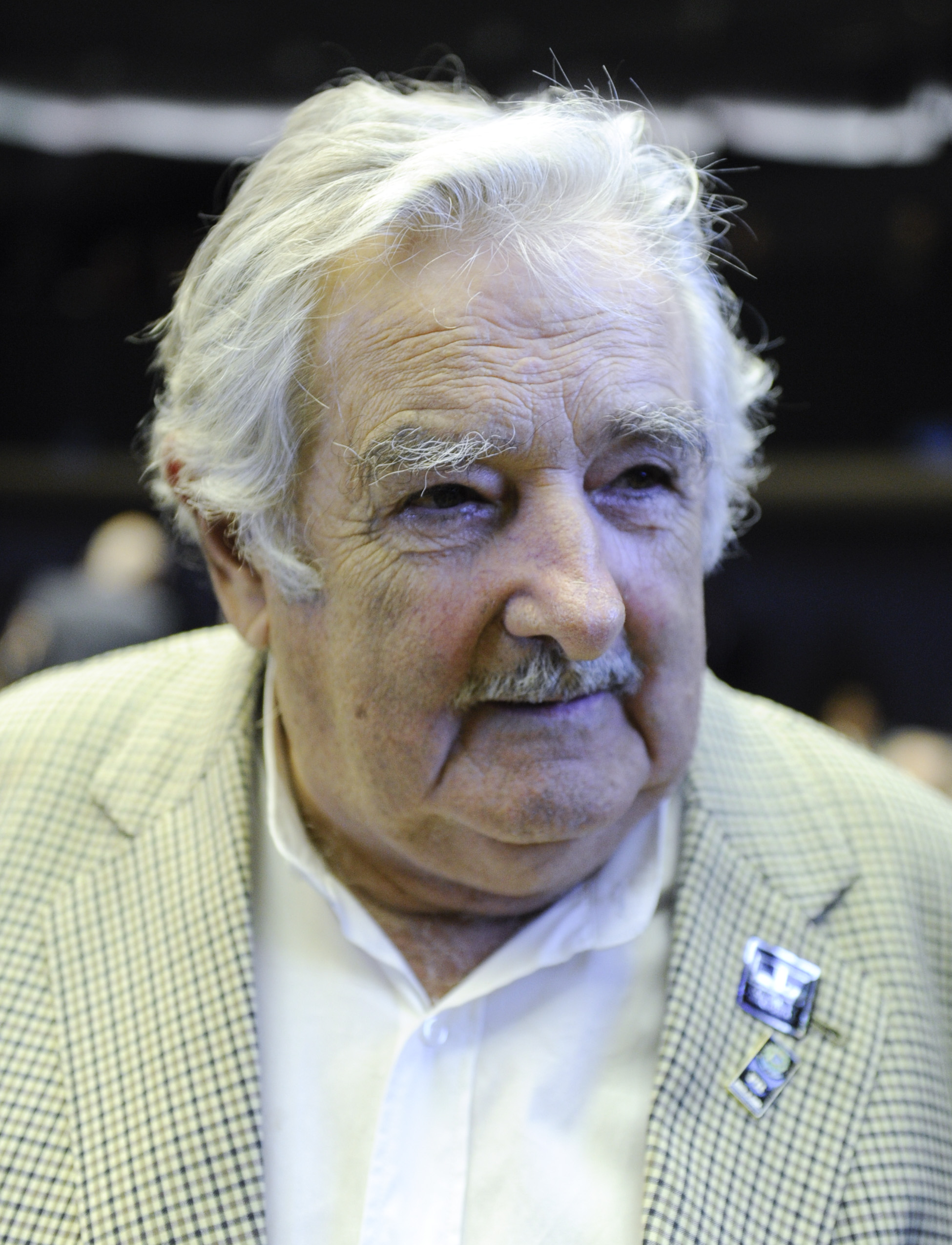
José Mujica

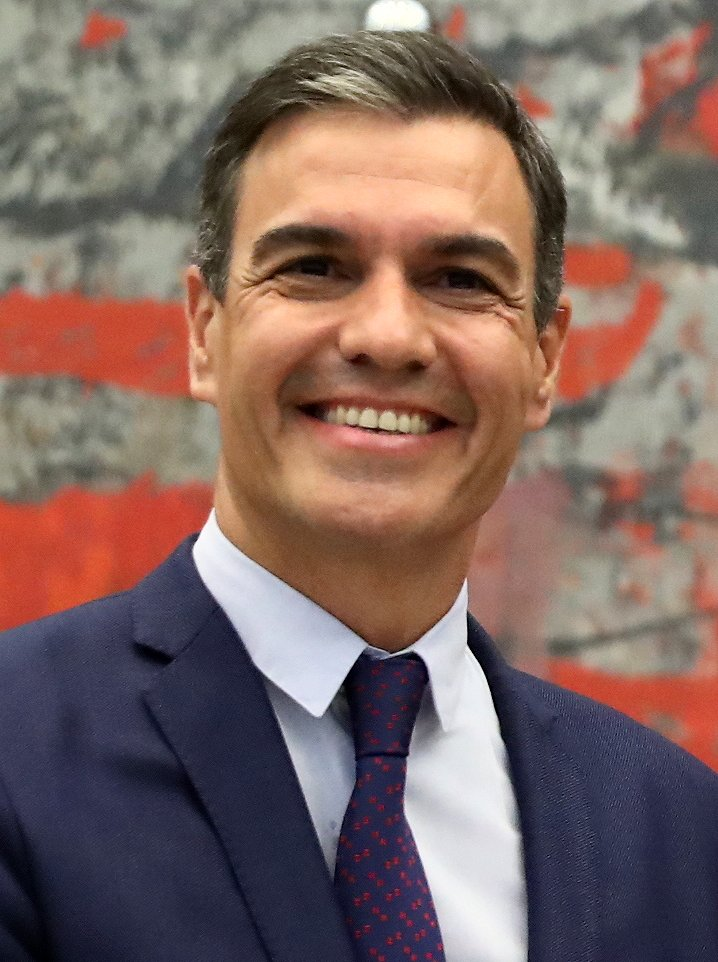
Pedro Sánchez

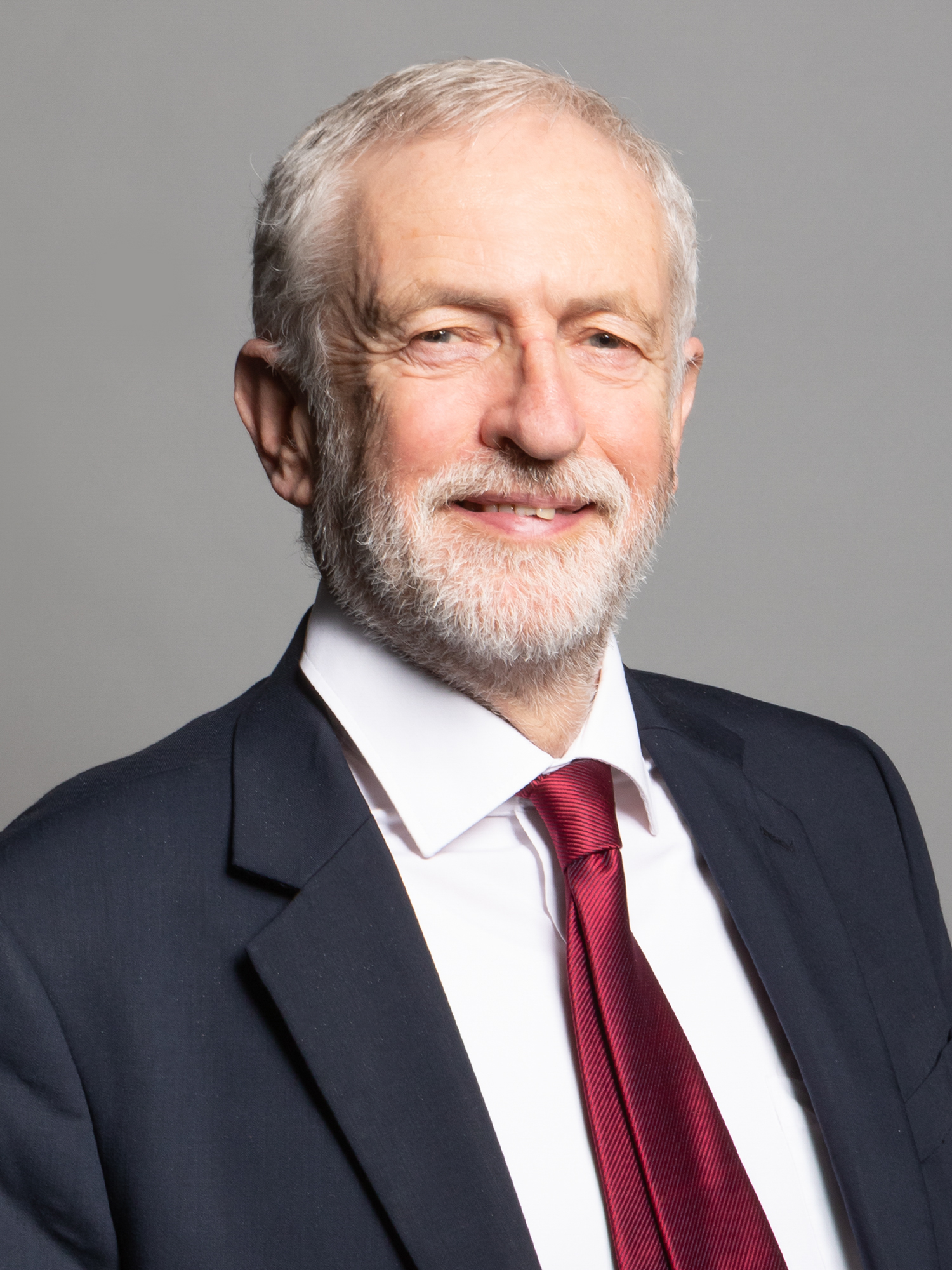
Jeremy Corbyn

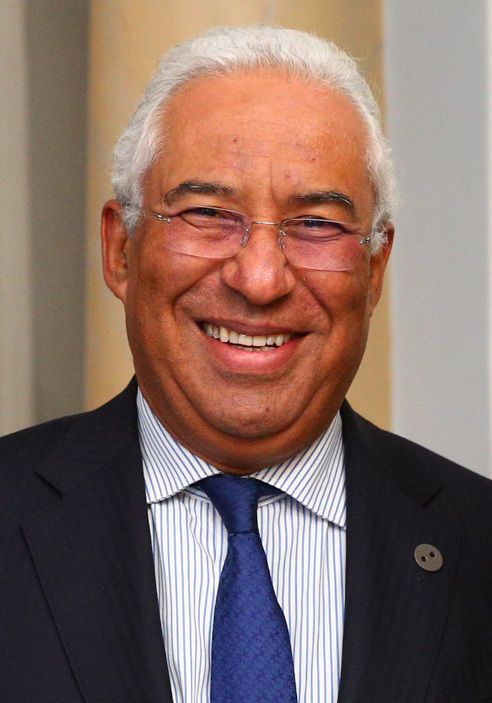
António Costa

==== Heads of state and government ====
- Alberto Fernández, President of Argentina (2019–2023)
- António Costa, Prime Minister of Portugal (2015–2024) (second round)
- Daniel Ortega, President of Nicaragua (2007–present) (second round)
- Dominique de Villepin, former Prime Minister of France (2005–2007)
- Enrico Letta, former Prime Minister of Italy (2013–2014)
- Elio Di Rupo, former Prime Minister of Belgium (2011–2014)
- Evo Morales, 65th President of Bolivia (2006–2019)
- François Hollande, former President of France (2012–2017)
- José Mujica, 40th President of Uruguay (2010–2015) (second round)
- José Luis Rodríguez Zapatero, former Prime Minister of Spain (2004–2011)
- Massimo D'Alema, former Prime Minister of Italy (1998–2000)
- Micheline Calmy-Rey former President of the Swiss Confederation (2003–2011)
- Rafael Correa, 45th President of Ecuador (2007–2017)
- Pedro Sánchez, Prime Minister of Spain (2018–present) (second round)

==== Other executive officials ====
- Amado Boudou, former Vice President of Argentina (2011–2015)
- Yolanda Díaz, Second Deputy Prime Minister of Spain (2021–present) (second round)

===== Members of national parliaments =====
- Jeremy Corbyn, Member of Parliament of the United Kingdom and former Leader of the Opposition (2015–2020)
- Piedad Córdoba, former Senator of Colombia (1994–2010)

==== Local officials ====
- Roberto Gualtieri, Mayor of Rome (2021–present) (second round)

=== Music ===
- Fernanda Abreu, singer
- Anavitória, musical duo
- Anitta, singer
- Arnaldo Antunes, singer
- Duda Beat, singer
- Inês Brasil, singer
- Carlinhos Brown, singer
- Gal Costa, singer
- Teresa Cristina, singer
- Djavan, singer
- Djonga, rapper
- Zélia Duncan, singer
- Emicida, rapper
- Finneas, American singer-songwriter (second round)
- Manu Gavassi, singer
- Gilberto Gil, composer and singer
- Grag Queen, singer and drag queen
- Gloria Groove, singer and drag queen
- Olivia Hime, singer
- Lenine, singer
- Letrux, singer
- Ludmilla, singer
- Ben McKee, American bassist (Imagine Dragons)
- Daniela Mercury, singer
- Paulo Miklos, musician
- Tom Morello, American guitarist (Rage Against the Machine & Audioslave)
- Diogo Nogueira, singer
- Zeca Pagodinho, singer
- Valesca Popozuda, singer
- Nando Reis, musician and producer
- Maria Rita, singer
- Racionais MC's, hip hop group
- Marisa Monte, singer
- Ivete Sangalo, singer (second round)
- Iza, singer
- Jão, singer
- Juliette, singer, lawyer and makeup artist
- Luísa Sonza, singer
- Fernanda Takai, singer
- Caetano Veloso, composer and singer
- Martinho da Vila, singer
- Pabllo Vittar, singer and drag queen
- Paulinho da Viola, singer
- Roger Waters, English singer (Pink Floyd)

=== Film and television ===
- Cláudia Abreu, actress
- José de Abreu, actor
- Karim Aïnouz, film director
- Juliana Alves, actress
- Tata Amaral, film director
- Jesuíta Barbosa, actor
- Alice Braga, actress
- Sonia Braga, actress
- Humberto Carrão, actor
- Deborah Evelyn, actress
- Vera Fischer, actress
- Bruno Gagliasso, actor
- Bruno Garcia, actor
- Danny Glover, American actor
- Mark Hamill, American actor
- Luciano Huck, television presenter (second round)
- Natália Lage, actress & television presenter
- Elisa Lucinda, actress
- Bruna Marquezine, actress
- Grazi Massafera, actress
- Luísa Mell, actress
- Kleber Mendonça, film director
- Jason Momoa, American actor (second round)
- Fernanda Montenegro, actress
- Drica Moraes, actress
- Camila Morgado, actress
- Wagner Moura, actor
- Felipe Neto, YouTuber
- Marisa Orth, actress and singer
- Silvero Pereira, actor
- Chico Pinheiro, newscaster
- Camila Pitanga, actress
- Zezé Polessa, actress
- Fabio Porchat, actor
- Maitê Proença, actress
- Mark Ruffalo, American actor
- Letícia Sabatella, actress
- Marcelo Serrado, actor
- Marieta Severo, actress
- Maisa Silva, television presenter and actress
- Xuxa, television presenter, actress, and singer

=== Businesspeople ===
- João Amoêdo, banker and founder of New Party (second round)
- Pérsio Arida, Former president of the Central Bank of Brazil (1995)
- Edmar Bacha, economist
- Otaviano Canuto, economist
- Arminio Fraga, Former president of the Central Bank of Brazil (1999–2003)

=== Sports ===
- Antônio Arroyo, professional MMA fighter
- Walter Casagrande, former professional footballer and pundit
- Juninho Fonseca, professional footballer
- Igor Julião, professional footballer
- Vanderlei Luxemburgo, former professional footballer and coach
- Joanna Maranhão, professional swimmer
- Marta, professional footballer
- Ana Moser, professional volleyballer
- Neto, professional footballer
- Paulinho, professional footballer
- Juninho Pernambucano, professional footballer
- Raí, professional footballer
- Reinaldo, professional footballer
- Diogo Silva, taekwondo athlete
- Carol Solberg, professional volleyballer
- Yuri, professional footballer

=== Philosophers ===
- Noam Chomsky, American linguist
- Vijay Prashad, Indian-American Marxist historian

=== Other ===
- Paola Carosella, Argentine chef
- Paulo Coelho, novelist
- Neil Gaiman, English writer
- Guilherme Leal, entrepreneur & majority shareholder of Natura (second round)
- Alan Moore, English writer
- Sebastião Salgado, photojournalist
- Edward Snowden, former employee of the NSA and CIA

=== Publications ===
- Jacobin, American political magazine
- Nature, British scientific journal
- The New York Times, American newspaper
- The Guardian, British newspaper

== Candidates ==
The following politicians announced their candidacy. The political parties had up to 15 August 2022 to formally register their candidates.

Lula da Silva	Geraldo Alckmin
for President	for Vice President
President of Brazil (2003–2011)	Governor of São Paulo (2011–2018)

== Election result ==
Lula (PT) vote distribution in the first round

Election year	Candidate	Running mate	First round			Second round		
Election year	Candidate	Running mate	# of overall votes	% of overall votes	Position	# of overall votes	% of overall votes	Position
2022	Luiz Inácio Lula da Silva	Geraldo Alckmin	57,258,115	48.43	First place	60,345,999	50.90%	First place

== See also ==
- Lulism
- 2002 Brazilian general election
- 2006 Brazilian general election
- Jair Bolsonaro 2022 presidential campaign
- Simone Tebet 2022 presidential campaign
