= Guilherme Leal =

Brazilian billionaire entrepreneur (born 1950)

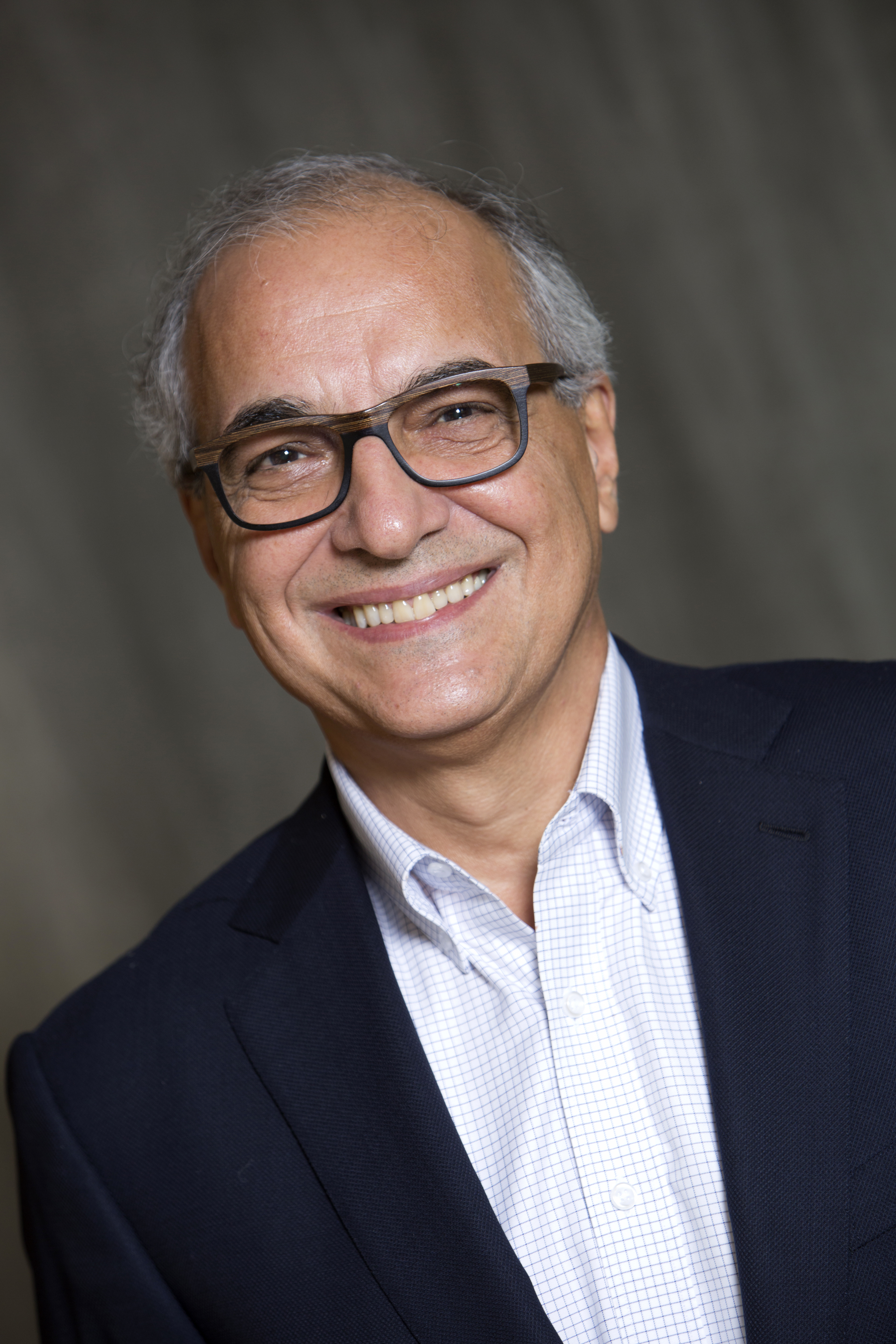
Guilherme Leal

Guilherme Peirão Leal (born in Santos on 22 February 1950) is a Brazilian businessman, social and environmental entrepreneur, and philanthropist. He is the co-founder of Natura Cosméticos (currently Natura &Co), one of the biggest beauty groups in the world, and currently co-chairs the Board of Directors of the company in which he holds an 11% stake and is a member of the board of Instituto Natura, which aims to improve Brazil’s public education system.

Over the last decades, Leal has become an investor in high-impact businesses, dedicating his time to the creation of a series of social organizations, such as the Abrinq Foundation for the Rights of Children and Adolescents, Ethos Institute for Business and Social Responsibility, and Akatu Institute for Conscious Consumption. In 2017, he co-founded the chocolate brand Dengo, which uses high quality cocoa produced by small family farmers in southern Bahia. He is also a member of the B Team, a group of global leaders who are driving better ways of doing business.

With a brief career in politics, Leal was the vice president candidate running with Marina Silva in the 2010 presidential election, for the Green Party (PV). They received over 20 million votes.

== Biography ==
Guilherme Leal was born in Santos (SP) in 1950. He is the youngest of four siblings and father of two. He holds a degree in Business Management from the University of São Paulo.

Leal worked in financial institutions and at Ferrovia Paulista S.A. (Fepasa). In 1979, after leaving Fepasa, he became a partner at Natura, when it was a small cosmetics shop located at Rua Oscar Freire, in São Paulo.

Alongside his partners, Luiz Seabra and Pedro Passos, Leal turned Natura into one of the biggest cosmetics companies in the world and a reference in sustainability. From the trio of founders, Leal was the one at the head of the initiative to invest in nature preservation and sustainable development, making the company adopt Brazilian biodiversity as a tool for cosmetics innovation and awareness about the Amazon.

The company established itself in the country’s northern region in the early 2000s, when it introduced Ekos, a cosmetics line based on the use of ingredients from Brazilian biodiversity. Carbon neutral since 2007, the company created a program to channel investments into the Amazon in 2011. Natura has become a case study not just for using raw material extracted from the native forest, but also for doing so while valuing and rewarding forest communities. For Leal, “companies must be agents that promote broad transformation in society and not mere means of wealth generation (...). The value and longevity of any business are connected to their ability to contribute to the evolution of society and its sustainable development.”

The businessman currently splits his time between philanthropic activities, other businesses, and investments, such as Dengo and Natura, where he has been co-chairman of the Board of Directors since 1998. Due to his work on sustainability, Leal is featured in the book Conversas com Líderes Sustentáveis (“Conversations with Sustainable Leaders”), in which he shares experiences and social and environmental stories.

In 2006, when Leal was included on the Forbes list of billionaires, his net worth was estimated at USD 1.4 billion. Four years later, he was part of the group of 18 Brazilians on the list with a net worth of USD 2.1 billion.

== Philanthropy ==
In addition to being the founder and former president of the Ethos Institute, created to help companies run their business in a socially responsible manner, Leal also participated in the creation and was a member of the board of the Abrinq Foundation, whose goal is to mobilize society for issues related to the defense of the rights of children and adolescents. He was a member of the board of WWF-Brazil and the Brazilian Biodiversity Fund (Funbio). In 2007, he co-founded the Our São Paulo Movement, whose objective is to organize several sectors of local society to create a better, fairer, more sustainable city. Leal usually says that “the new generation of philanthropists wants to deal with problem causes, not just their consequences.”

== Arapyaú Institute ==
In 2008, the businessman founded Institute Arapyaú, a non-profit organization focused on the sustainable development of the economy, the environment, politics, and society. The institution identifies opportunities and voluntarily channels funds and strategic resources to organizations, networks, and projects engaged in promoting sustainable development.

Since its foundation, Arapyaú has helped to create other networks like the Brazilian Coalition on Climate, Forests and Agriculture, a multi-sector movement that aims to promote the harmonic use of the land, and, most recently, the initiative Amazon Concertation, which brings together leaders from the public and private sectors, indigenous peoples, civil society, and the media to propose solutions for the region’s sustainable development. Another project supported by the Institute, Mapbiomas maps the coverage and soil use every year to make accessible information about transformations in the Brazilian territory.

== The revival of cocoa in southern Bahia ==
One of the programs created by Arapyaú, called Territorial Development in the South of Bahia, aspires to make the Cocoa Coast region an example of sustainable economy by leveraging its potential. The program, of which Leal is an enthusiast, fosters projects that strengthen the cocoa production chain and inclusive entrepreneurship, in addition to supporting local leaders to improve formal education and participative regional development.

The businessman’s relationship with southern Bahia started in 2006, when he bought a plot of land in the region for moments of relaxation. Leal got involved with the local community and started to develop there one of the biggest projects of revitalization of the region’s cocoa culture.

In the village of Serra Grande, in the municipality of Uruçuca, Arapyaú was born in 2008, inspired by the possibility of helping to make the struggling region a concrete example of sustainable development. Roughly 70% of the cocoa produced in Brazil comes from southern Bahia. This culture is based on an agroforestry system known as cabruca, in which the crops are planted in the shade of native Atlantic Forest trees. Strengthening the cocoa and chocolate chain is essential for local development.

In 2015, Arapyaú was one of the idealizers of the Cocoa Innovation Center (CIC), the first initiative from the Science and Technology Park of Southern Bahia (PCTSul). This Center was key to including Brazil on the international list of quality cocoa producing countries. One of the institute’s initiatives consists in facilitating access to credit to the region’s small cocoa producers, through the Agribusiness Receivables Certificate (CRA), which combines market investments and philanthropic contributions.

Leal’s commitment with the region and the transforming potential of cocoa made the businessman invest in a new business, the chocolate brand Dengo, founded in 2016. The company is committed to providing training to farmers in the region known as the Cocoa Coast, paying the highest rate in the market, and contributing to changing the life of each one of them. Dengo’s goal is to double the income of at least 3,000 cocoa producing families by 2030.

== Political activity ==
For Leal, “you can’t change the country without politics”. In 2019, he shared his vision on the subject at an event organized by the B System, a global movement that advances corporate social and environmental responsibility, held in Mendoza, Argentina. According to Leal, building a fairer, more egalitarian society is a collective responsibility. Even though companies are an important part of this process, they can’t do it alone. Society has to be present and governments have to do their part.

In 2010, Leal had a brief experience in politics. After joining the Green Party, on May 16, 2010, the businessman was officially nominated as the vice president pre-candidate with Marina Silva, on invitation from the presidential pre-candidate. The founder of Natura was the main campaign contributor, donating at the time R$11.85 million. This amount exceeds the donations made by construction company Andrade Gutierrez (R$1.1 million), Banco Itaú (R$1 million), and businessman Eike Batista (R$500,000). They received over 20 million votes.

After the 2012 elections, he decided to no longer directly engage in politics, left the Green Party, and, alongside other colleagues and social entrepreneurs, founded the Political Action Network for Sustainability (RAPS), which was born with the mission of fostering commitment with sustainability in politics by developing more responsible and democratic political leadership.

At the 2022 elections, after 10 years of activity, RAPS leaders received over 38 million votes, with a total of 55 elected officials, including governors, vice-governors, congressmen, state representatives, and senators.

== Commitment to democracy ==
Leal has affirmed he doesn’t intend to run for office again, while also making it clear he won’t shy away from politics. Over the past years, he has advocated for democracy on several occasions, which is one of his causes, next to social and environmental issues.

In 2018, he signed the “For democracy, for Brazil” manifesto, which was against Jair Bolsonaro’s candidacy. The document, supported by artists, lawyers, activists, and businesspeople, affirmed at the time that a movement against the PSL candidate’s antidemocratic project was necessary.

In August 2022, he was one of the signers of the “Letter to Brazilians in Defense of the Democratic Rule of Law,” a manifesto organized by the University of São Paulo Law School as a reaction to the recurrent attacks on the country’s electoral system by incumbent president Jair Bolsonaro (PL).
