= Guilherme Colombo =

Brazilian politician (born 1986)

Member of the Legislative Assembly of Santa Catarina
- Incumbent
- Assumed office 1 February 2027

Personal details
- Born: 2 November 1986 (age 40)
- Party: Liberal Party
- Spouse: Julia Zanatta (m. 2026)

Guilherme Horacio Colombo (born 2 November 1986) is a Brazilian politician who was elected member of the Legislative Assembly of Santa Catarina in 2026. He has been married to Julia Zanatta since 2026.
