= Rosana Valle =

Brazilian politician (born 1969)

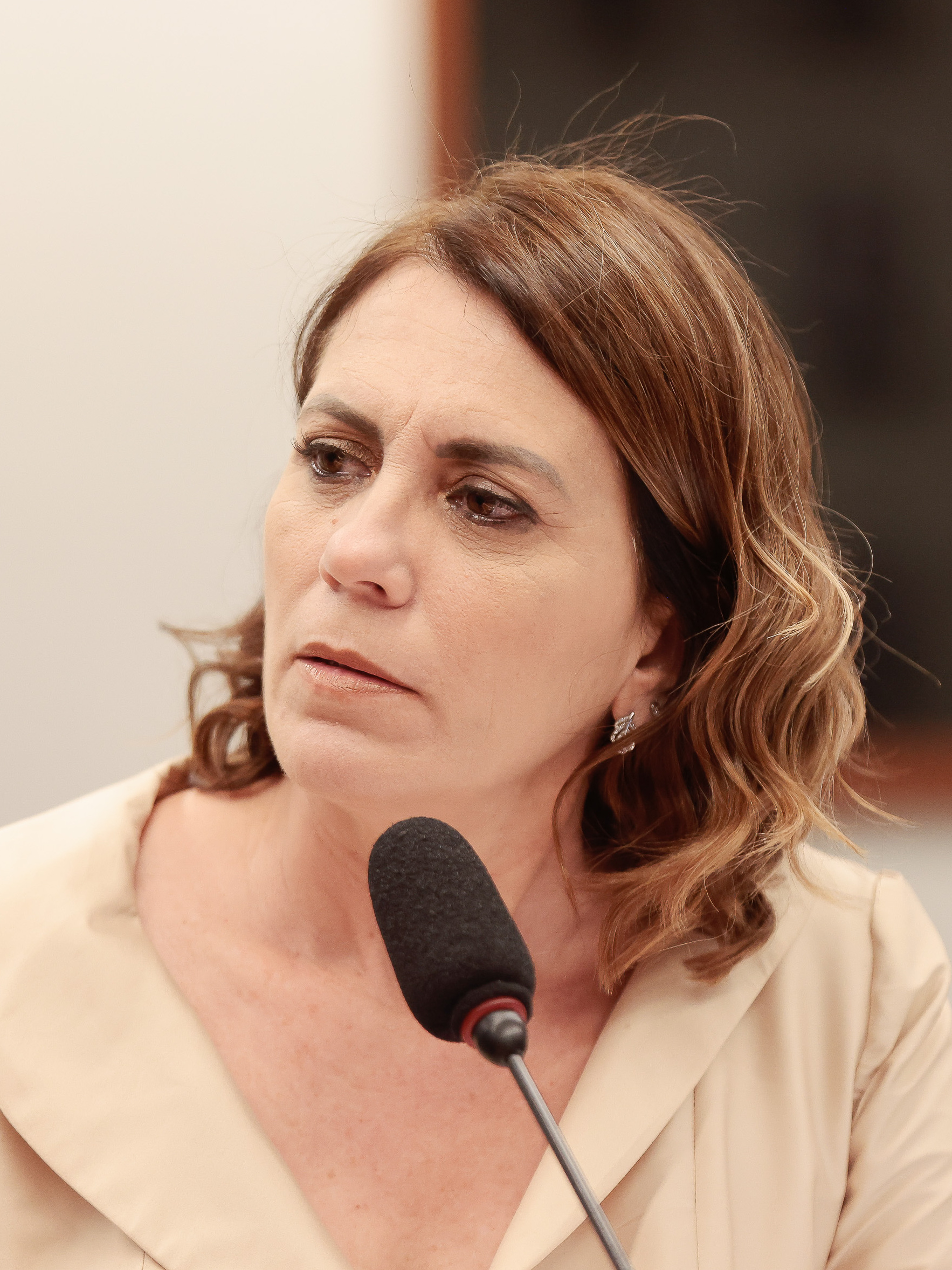
- Valle in 2022

Member of the Chamber of Deputies
- Incumbent
- Assumed office 1 February 2019
- Constituency: São Paulo

Personal details
- Born: Rosana de Oliveira Valle; 8 May 1969 (age 57)
- Party: Liberal (since 2022)

Rosana de Oliveira Valle (born 8 May 1969) is a Brazilian politician serving as a member of the Chamber of Deputies since 2019. In the 2024 municipal elections, she was a candidate for mayor of Santos.
