= Julia Zanatta =

Brazilian politician (born 1985)

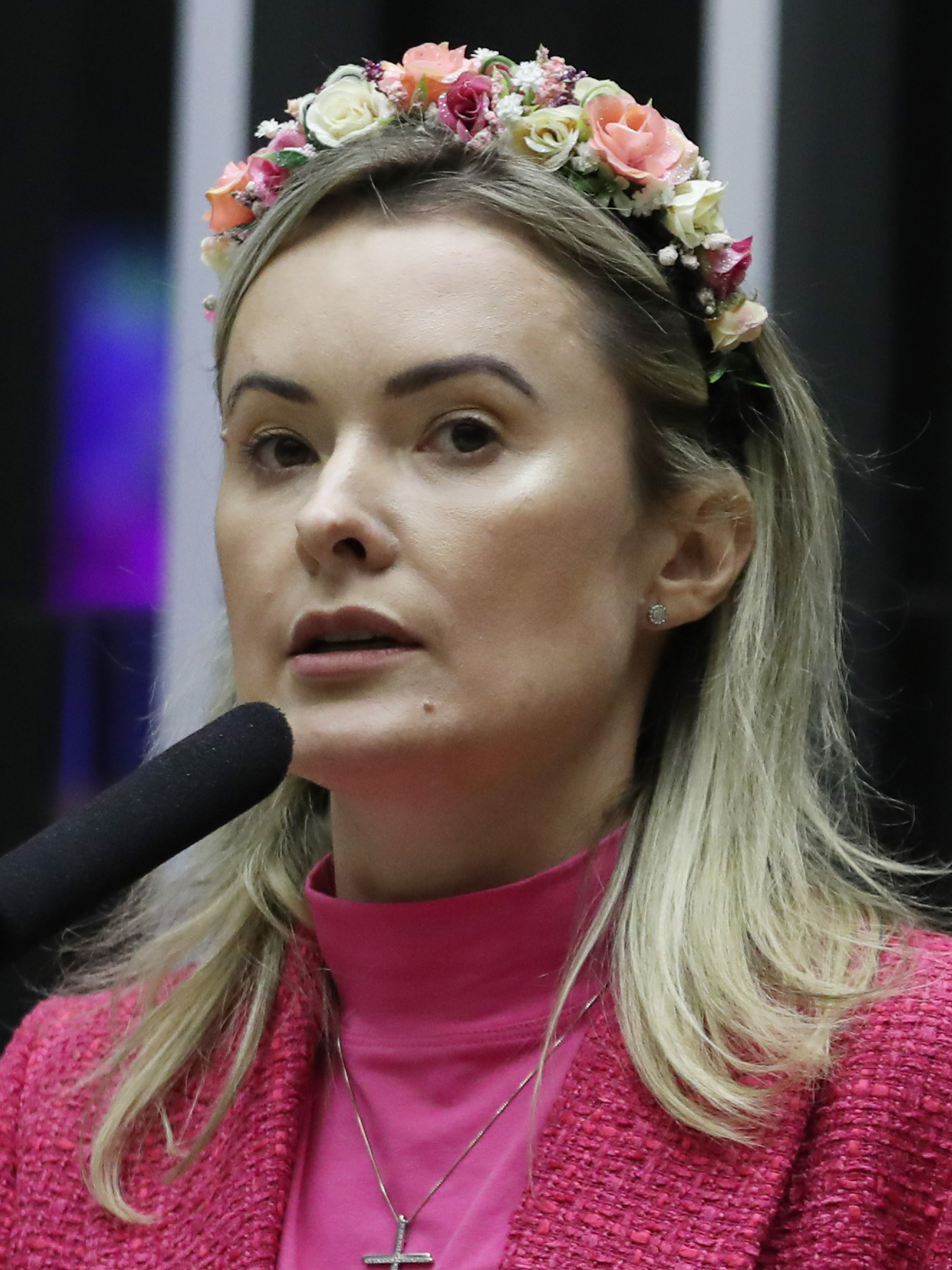
- Zanatta in 2023

Member of the Chamber of Deputies
- Incumbent
- Assumed office 1 February 2023
- Constituency: Santa Catarina

Personal details
- Born: Julia Pedroso Zanatta; 20 March 1985 (age 41) Criciúma, Santa Catarina, Brazil
- Party: PL (since 2022)
- Other political affiliations: PSD (2016–2020)
- Spouse: Guilherme Colombo (m. 2026)
- Relatives: Ricardo Guidi (cousin)

Julia Pedroso Zanatta (born 20 March 1985) is a Brazilian politician serving as a member of the Chamber of Deputies since 2023. In the 2020 municipal elections, she was a candidate for mayor of Criciúma.
