= Paulo Bilynskyj =

Brazilian politician (born 1987)

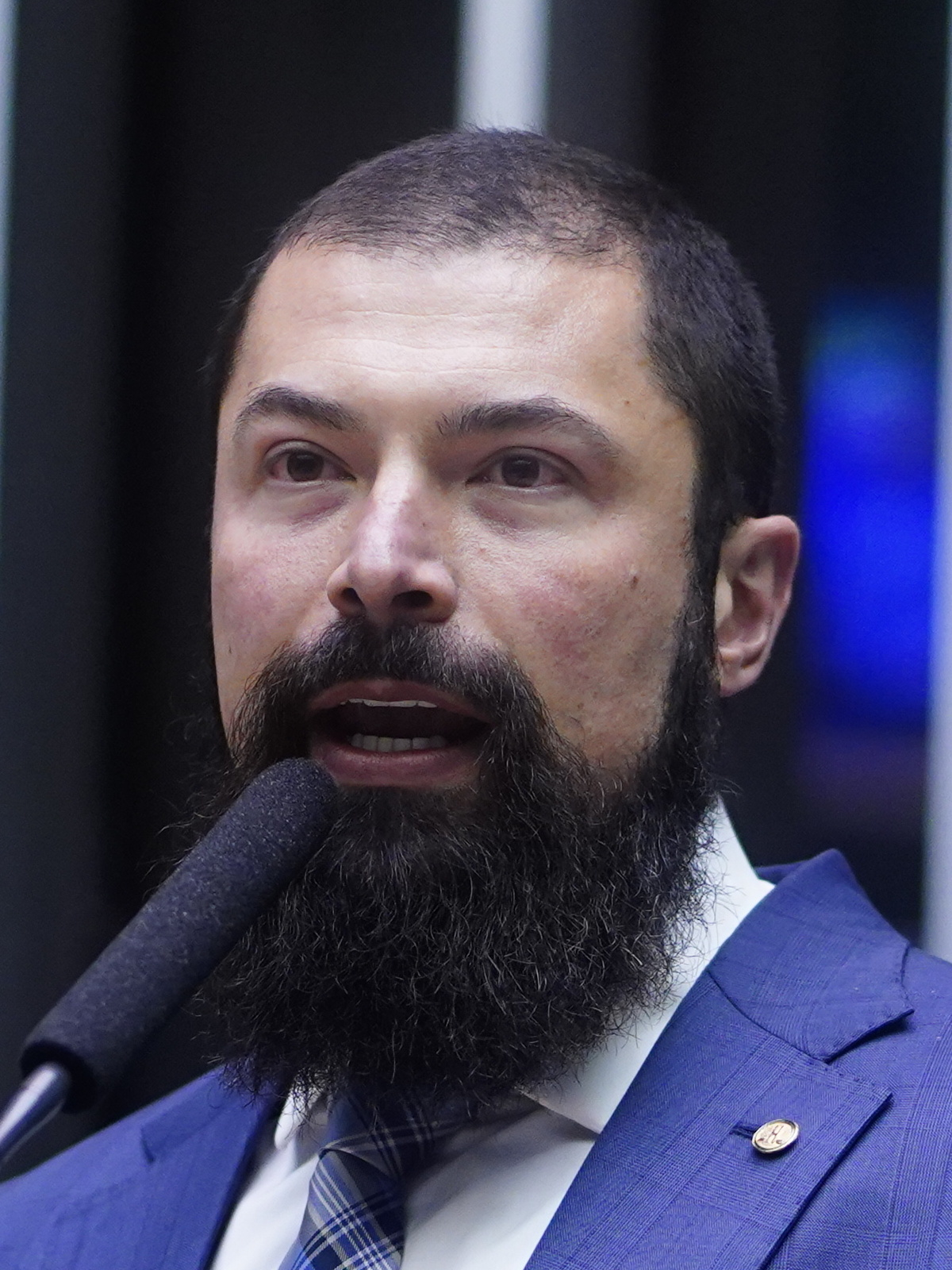
- Bilynskyj in 2023

Member of the Chamber of Deputies
- Incumbent
- Assumed office 1 February 2023
- Constituency: São Paulo

Personal details
- Born: Paulo Francisco Muniz Bilynskyj; 10 March 1987 (age 39) São Paulo, Brazil
- Party: PL (since 2022)
- Other political affiliations: PSDB (2018); PSL (2018–2019)
- Profession: Police officer
- Website: paulobilynskyj.com

Paulo Francisco Muniz Bilynskyj (born 10 March 1987) is a Brazilian politician serving as a member of the Chamber of Deputies since 2023. He has served as chairman of the public security committee since 2025.
