= Simone Marquetto =

Brazilian politician (born 1975)

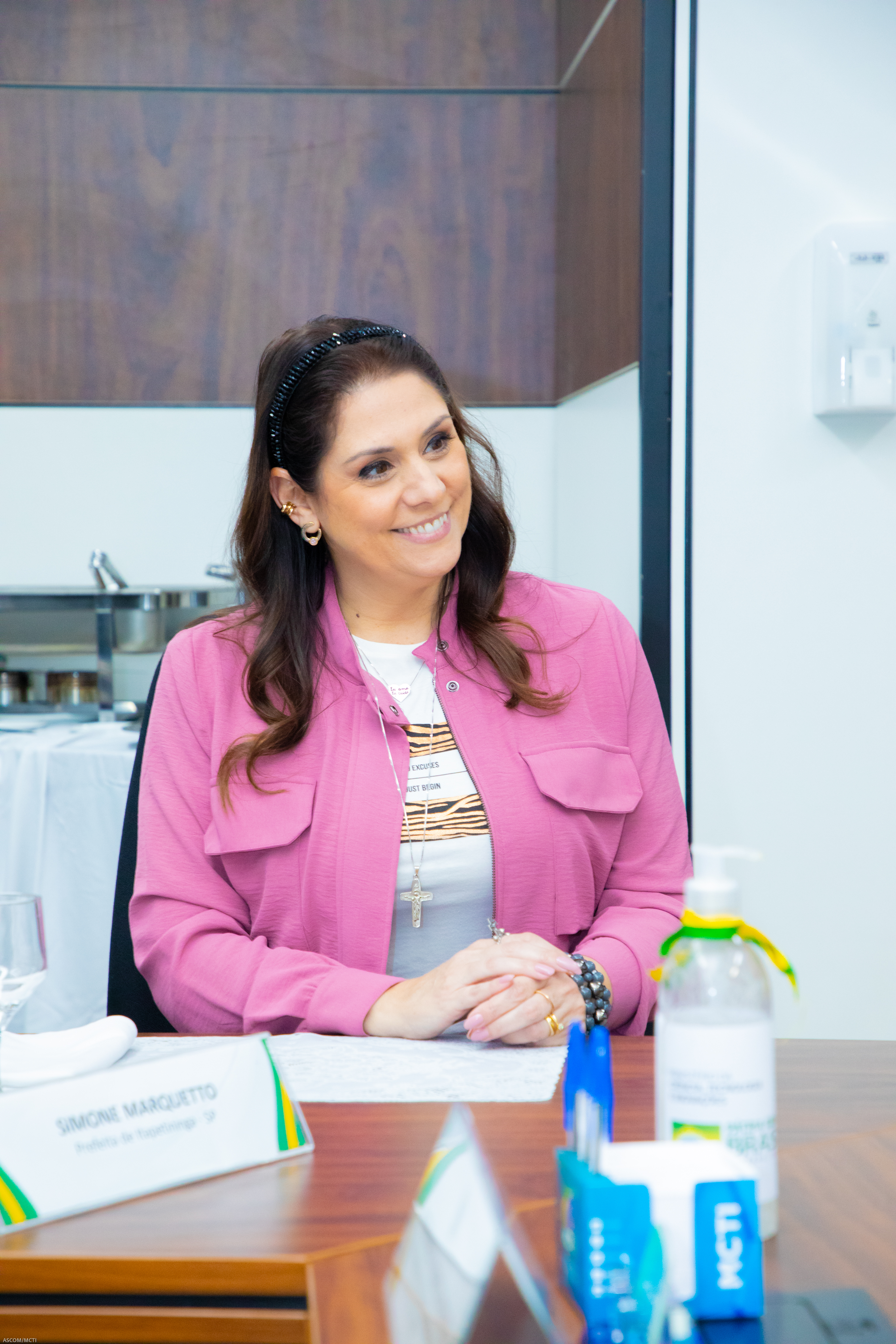
- Marquetto in 2021

Member of the Chamber of Deputies
- Incumbent
- Assumed office 1 February 2023
- Constituency: São Paulo

Personal details
- Born: 20 September 1975 (age 51)
- Party: Brazilian Democratic Movement (since 2015)

Simone Aparecida Curraladas dos Santos (born 20 September 1975), better known as Simone Marquetto, is a Brazilian politician serving as a member of the Chamber of Deputies since 2023. From 2017 to 2022, she served as mayor of Itapetininga.
