= Pedro Guimarães (economist) =

Brazilian economist

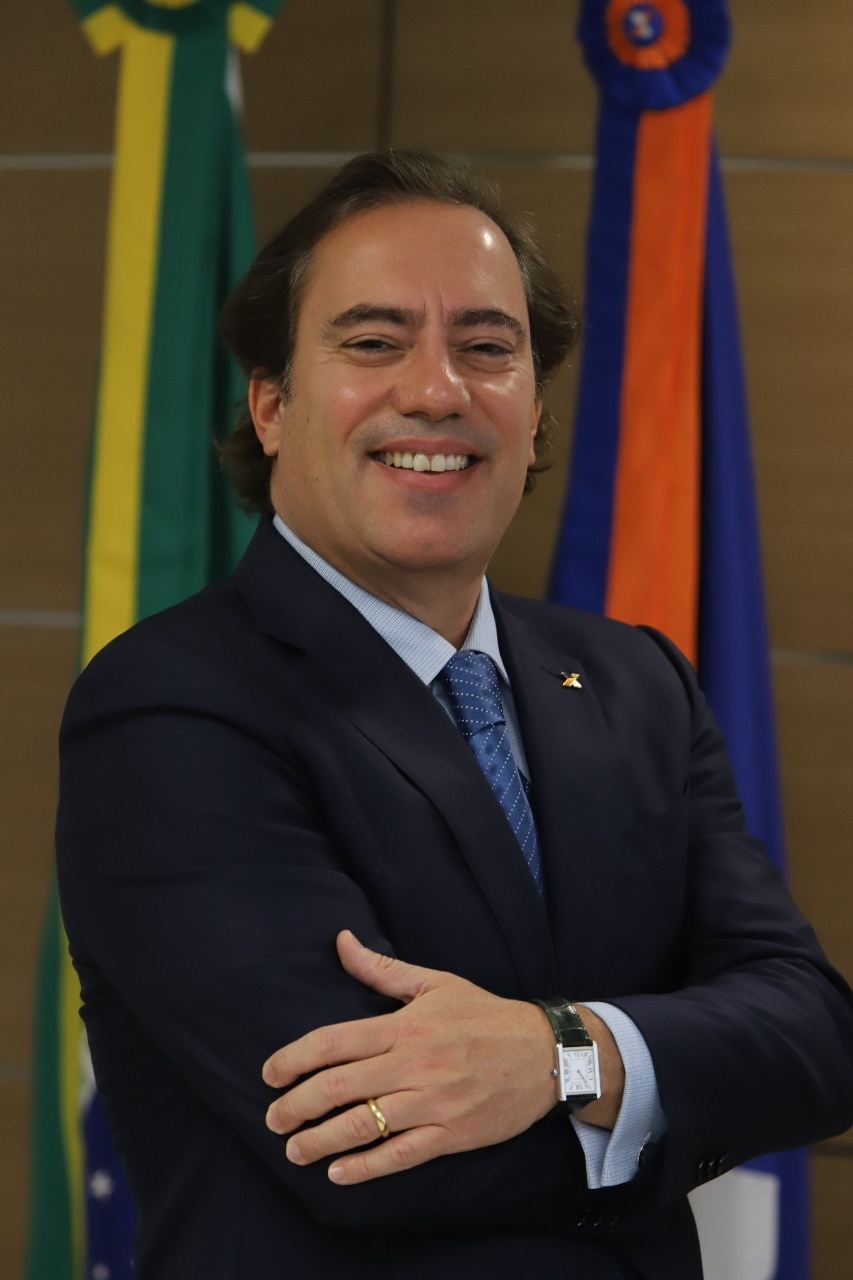

Chairman of the Federal Savings Bank
- In office 7 January 2019 – 29 June 2022
- President: Jair Bolsonaro
- Preceded by: Nelson de Souza

Personal details
- Born: Pedro Duarte Guimarães
- Education: Pontifical Catholic University of Rio de Janeiro (BEc); Fundação Getúlio Vargas (M.Ec); University of Rochester (Ph.D.)
- Occupation: Economist

Pedro Duarte Guimarães is a Brazilian economist. He had served as chairman of Caixa Econômica Federal from 2019 to 2022 and former partner of the investment bank Brasil Plural.

Guimarães resigned from office after accusations of sexual abuse against women employees of the state-owned bank were published by Metrópoles. The case is in a confidential investigation conducted by the Federal Public Prosecutor's Office since late 2021.

== Early life ==
He was born in Rio de Janeiro. He earned Pedro Guimarães a Ph.D. in economics from the University of Rochester, Master in Economics from Fundação Getúlio Vargas of Rio de Janeiro (FGV-RJ) and Bachelor of Economics from Pontifical Catholic University of Rio de Janeiro (PUC-Rio).

== Career ==
He specialized in privatizations in the U.S. and in Brazil and signaled that the bank expects to save R$3,5 billion in two years and revised deals to achieve this goal.

He was a member of the Board of Directors of Terra Brasis Resseguros and Eólicas do Sul.

He was an advisor for the Privatization programme in the Banespa, the oldest state bank of São Paulo.

== Sexual Harassment ==
On June 28, 2022, the Brazilian website Metrópoles published an article with multiple reports from Caixa's female employees stating that Pedro Guimarães would, in several occasions, sexually harassed them, trying to force his employees to initiate sexual relations with him. The employees' initiative resulted in a formal investigation from Ministério Público Federal, this being the first public case of sexual harassment involving a high rank employee from Jair Bolsonaro's government.

According to O Globo journal, Pedro Guimarães would have already been reported for sexual harassment by a colleague in another bank. Such case was supposedly concluded after the payment of a fine by the company to the other party.

Government offices
Preceded by Nelson de Souza	Chairman of the Federal Savings Bank; 2019–2022	Vacant
