= Jair Bolsonaro 2022 presidential campaign =

2022 Brazil presidential campaign

- Campaign: 2022 Brazilian general election
- Candidate: Jair Bolsonaro; 38th President of Brazil; (2019–2023); Walter Braga Netto; 13th Minister of Defence; (2021–2022)
- Affiliation: Liberal Party; Coalition partners: Republicanos; Progressistas
- Status: Announced: 27 March 2022; Official nominee: 24 July 2022; Official launch: 16 August 2022; Qualified for run-off: 2 October 2022; Lost election: 30 October 2022
- Key people: Walter Braga Netto (campaign coordinator); Flávio Bolsonaro (campaign coordinator); Valdemar Costa Neto (campaign coordinator); Ciro Nogueira (campaign coordinator); Fabio Wajngarten (communications director); Carlos Bolsonaro (social media coordinator); Luiz Eduardo Ramos (senior advisor)
- Slogan: For the good of Brazil

The Jair Bolsonaro 2022 presidential campaign was officialized on 24 July 2022 in Rio de Janeiro. His running mate was former Minister of Defence Walter Braga Netto. Incumbent president Jair Bolsonaro, elected in 2018 for the first term, ran for re-election and a second term but ultimately lost to Lula da Silva.

== Background ==
On 26 June 2022, President Jair Bolsonaro (PL) announced in an interview in Jovem Pan News program Programa 4x4 that he would nominate Walter Braga Netto (PL) as his running mate for the 2022 presidential election. On 24 July 2022, the Liberal Party confirmed both Bolsonaro and Braga Netto candidacies. It was held in Maracanãzinho Gymnasium, North Side of Rio de Janeiro.

== Campaign ==
On 8 August, Bolsonaro was interviewed in Flow Podcast, where he criticized the Supreme Federal Court and Petrobras. The streaming reached a peak of more than 558,000 viewers.

== Endorsements ==
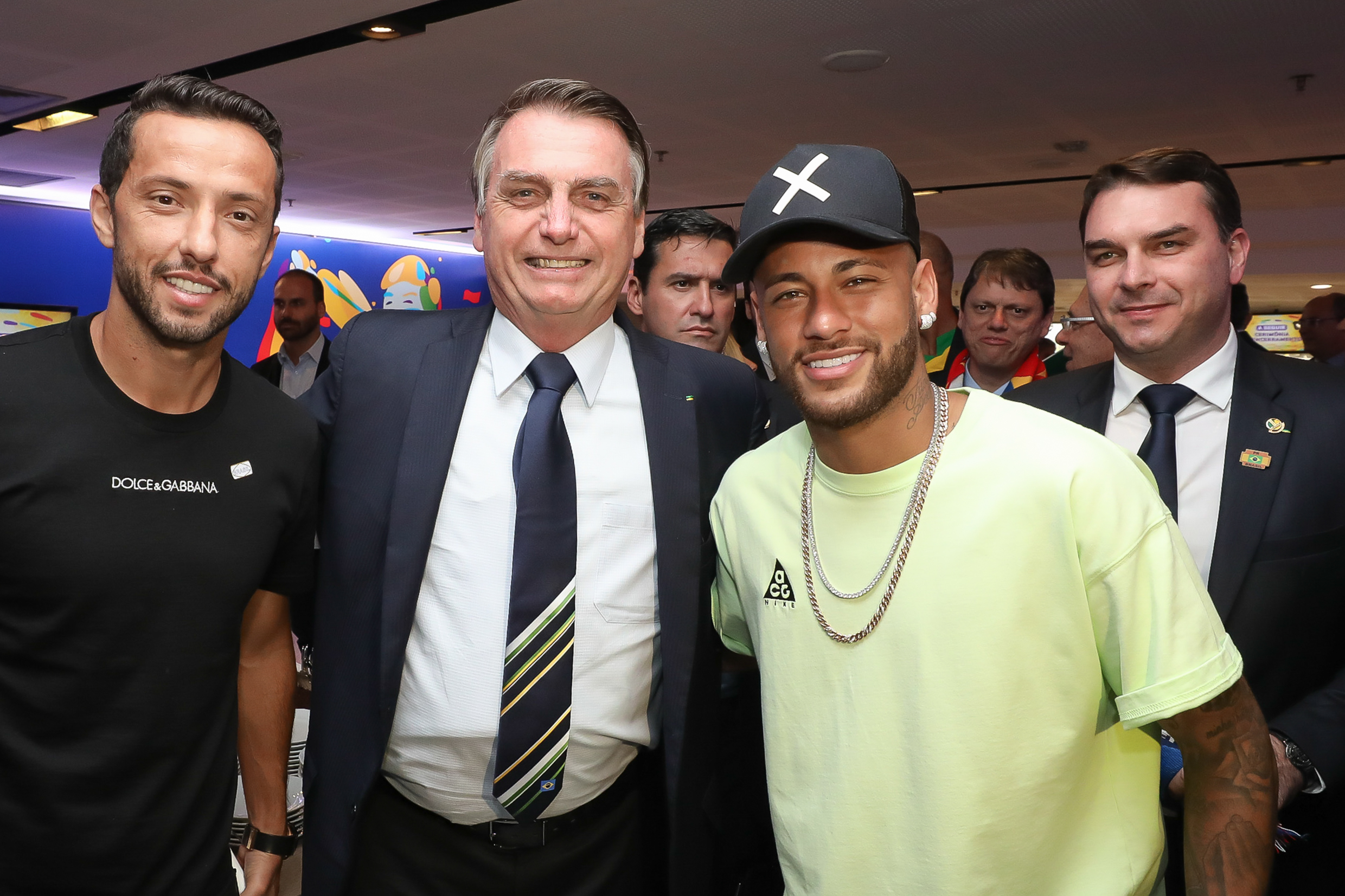
In September 2022, Brazilian football star Neymar announced his support for Jair Bolsonaro in the 2022 Brazilian general election.

=== Brazilian politicians ===
==== Former presidents ====
- Fernando Collor de Mello, 32nd President of Brazil (1990–1992) & Senator for Alagoas

==== Senators ====
- Carlos Portinho, Senator for Rio de Janeiro
- Carlos Viana, Senator for Minas Gerais
- Eduardo Girão, Senator for Ceará
- Flávio Bolsonaro, Senator for Rio de Janeiro & eldest son of Jair Bolsonaro
- Luiz Philippe of Orléans-Braganza, politician and former ruling House of Orléans-Braganza (second round)
- Marcos Rogério, Senator for Rondônia
- Romário, Senator for Rio de Janeiro and former professional footballer
- Sergio Moro, Former Federal Judge and Senator-elect for Paraná
- Wellington Fagundes, Senator for Mato Grosso
- Zequinha Marinho, Senator for Pará

==== Deputies ====
- Eduardo Cunha, former President of the Chamber of Deputies (2015-2016)
- Deltan Dallagnol, Federal Deputy-elect from Paraná and former lead prosecutor of Operation Car Wash
- Mário Frias, Federal Deputy from São Paulo (assumes in 2023) and actor
- Marcel van Hattem, Federal Deputy from Rio Grande do Sul

==== Governors and local officials ====
- Antonio Denarium, Governor of Roraima
- Cláudio Castro, Governor of Rio de Janeiro
- Fernando Holiday, City Counselor of São Paulo (second round)
- Gladson Cameli, Governor of Acre
- Ibaneis Rocha, Governor of the Federal District (second round)
- Mauro Mendes, Governor of Mato Grosso
- Romeu Zema, Governor of Minas Gerais
- Rodrigo Garcia, Governor of São Paulo (second round)
- Ronaldo Caiado, Governor of Goiás (second round)
- Ratinho Júnior, Governor of Paraná
- Reinaldo Azambuja, Governor of Mato Grosso do Sul (second round)
- Wilson Lima, Governor of Amazonas (second round)

=== International politicians ===
==== Heads of state and government ====
- Benjamin Netanyahu, former Prime Minister of Israel (1996–1999, 2009–2021)
- Donald Trump, 45th President of the United States (2017–2021)
- Juan Guaidó, Interim President of Venezuela (2019–2023)
- Viktor Orbán, Prime Minister of Hungary (1998–2002, 2010–2026)

==== Member of national parliaments ====
- André Ventura, Member of the Assembly of the Republic (2019–present) and president of Chega
- José Antonio Kast, former Member of the Chamber of Deputies of Chile (2002–2018)
- Javier Milei, Member of the Argentine Chamber of Deputies (2021–2023)
- María Fernanda Cabal, Member of Senate of Colombia (2018–present)
- Santiago Abascal, Member of the Congress of Deputies (2019–present) and President of the Spanish party Vox

==== Others politicians ====
- Donald Trump Jr., political activist and son of Donald Trump
- Malik Obama, Kenyan-American businessman, politician, and older half-brother of Barack Obama (second round)

=== Athletes ===
- José Aldo, professional MMA fighter
- Dani Alves, professional footballer
- Rafael dos Anjos, professional mixed martial artist
- Vitor Belfort, professional mixed martial artist
- Bruno, professional footballer
- Romero Cavalcanti, Brazilian Jiu-Jitsu master and the founder of Alliance Jiu Jitsu (second round)
- Júlio César, professional footballer
- Ana Paula Connelly, professional volleyball player
- Paulo Costa, professional mixed martial artist
- Cris Cyborg, professional mixed martial artist
- Dagoberto, professional footballer
- Lucas di Grassi, racing driver
- Ederson, professional footballer
- Falcão, professional futsal player
- Acelino Freitas, former professional boxer
- Emerson Fittipaldi, former Formula One and Indianapolis 500 champion
- Renato Gaucho, professional football coach
- Royce Gracie, retired professional mixed martial artist
- Fábio Gurgel, 4x World Jiu-Jitsu Champion
- Marcos, professional footballer
- Felipe Melo, professional footballer
- Lucas Moura, professional footballer
- Nenê, professional basketballer
- Neymar, professional footballer
- Natália Pereira, professional volleyball player
- Nelson Piquet, former racecar driver
- Rafael, professional footballer
- Rivaldo, professional footballer
- Robinho, professional footballer
- Ronaldinho, professional footballer
- Maurício Rua, professional mixed martial artist
- Thiago Santos, professional mixed martial artist
- Thiago Silva, professional footballer
- Wanderlei Silva, professional mixed martial artist
- Wallace de Souza, professional volleyball player
- Maurício Souza, professional volleyball player
- João Victor, professional footballer
- Fabrício Werdum, professional mixed martial artist

=== Celebrities ===
- Patricia Abravanel, television presenter
- Amado Batista, singer
- Zezé Di Camargo, singer
- Nana Caymmi, singer
- Regina Duarte, actress
- Chitãozinho, singer
- Leonardo, singer
- Bruno, singer
- Fernando & Sorocaba, Sertanejo duo
- Felipe Folgosi, actor
- Latino, singer
- Gusttavo Lima, singer
- Mario Vargas Llosa, Peruvian novelist
- Silas Malafaia, televangelist
- Humberto Martins, actor
- Marrone, singer
- Sula Miranda, singer
- Netinho, singer
- Ratinho, television presenter
- Sérgio Reis, singer
- Malvino Salvador, actor
- Andressa Urach, model
- Ana Paula Valadão, gospel singer (second round)

=== Business ===
- Luciano Hang, entrepreneur, co-founder of the Havan department store chain
- Roberto Justus, investor & businessman (second round)
- Flávio Rocha, CEO and Chairman of Lojas Riachuelo
- Silvio Santos, media tycoon, founder of SBT & TV presenter

=== Journalism ===
- Rodrigo Constantino, political commentator
- Tiago Leifert, journalist and television presenter
- Leda Nagle, journalist and television presenter

== Candidates ==
The following politicians announced their candidacy. The political parties had up to 15 August 2022 to formally register their candidates.

Liberal Party ticket
Jair Bolsonaro	Walter Braga Netto
for President	for Vice President
President of Brazil (2019–2023)	Minister of Defence (2021–2022)

== Election result ==
Jair Bolsonaro (PL) vote distribution in the first round

Election year	Candidate	Running mate	First round		Second round	
Election year	Candidate	Running mate	# of overall votes	% of overall vote	# of overall votes	% of overall vote
2022	Jair Bolsonaro	Braga Netto	51,071,277	43.20 #2	58,206,354	49.10% #2

== See also ==
- Bolsonarism
- Jair Bolsonaro 2018 presidential campaign
- 2018 Brazilian general election
- Flávio Bolsonaro 2026 presidential campaign (Son's run)
- Lula da Silva 2022 presidential campaign
- Simone Tebet 2022 presidential campaign
- Controversies involving Jair Bolsonaro
