= João Goulart Filho 2018 presidential campaign =

- Campaigned for: 2018 Brazilian general election
- Candidate: João Goulart Filho (President); Léo Alves; Vice
- Affiliation: PPL; Purebred
- Status: Official nominee: August 5, 2018; Lost in the first round: October 7, 2018
- Slogan: Quem gosta do Brasil vota nele (Who likes Brazil votes for him)
- Website: www.joaogoulartfilho54.com.br Wayback Machine

João Goulart Filho's presidential campaign in 2018 was made official on August 5, 2018 having as vice president Léo Alves, a professor of Catholic University of Brasília. The platform was purebred and competed for the PPL.

== Proposals ==
João Goulart Filho advocated for increasing public investments, doubling the minimum wage in up to 4 years, was opposed to privatization, labor and social security reforms.

== Motto ==
João Goulart Filho's campaign motto was "Who likes Brazil votes for him".

== Election result ==
=== Presidential elections ===
Election year	Candidate	First round		Second round	
Election year	Candidate	# of overall votes	% of overall vote	# of overall votes	% of overall vote
2018	João Goulart Filho	30.176	0.03	Did not qualify	Did not qualify

== See also ==
- Ciro Gomes 2018 presidential campaign
- Fernando Haddad 2018 presidential campaign
- Geraldo Alckmin 2018 presidential campaign
- Guilherme Boulos 2018 presidential campaign
- Jair Bolsonaro 2018 presidential campaign
- João Amoêdo 2018 presidential campaign

== Notes ==
1. Purebred plate is one formed by members of the same party.
