= Centrão =

Group of political parties in Brazil

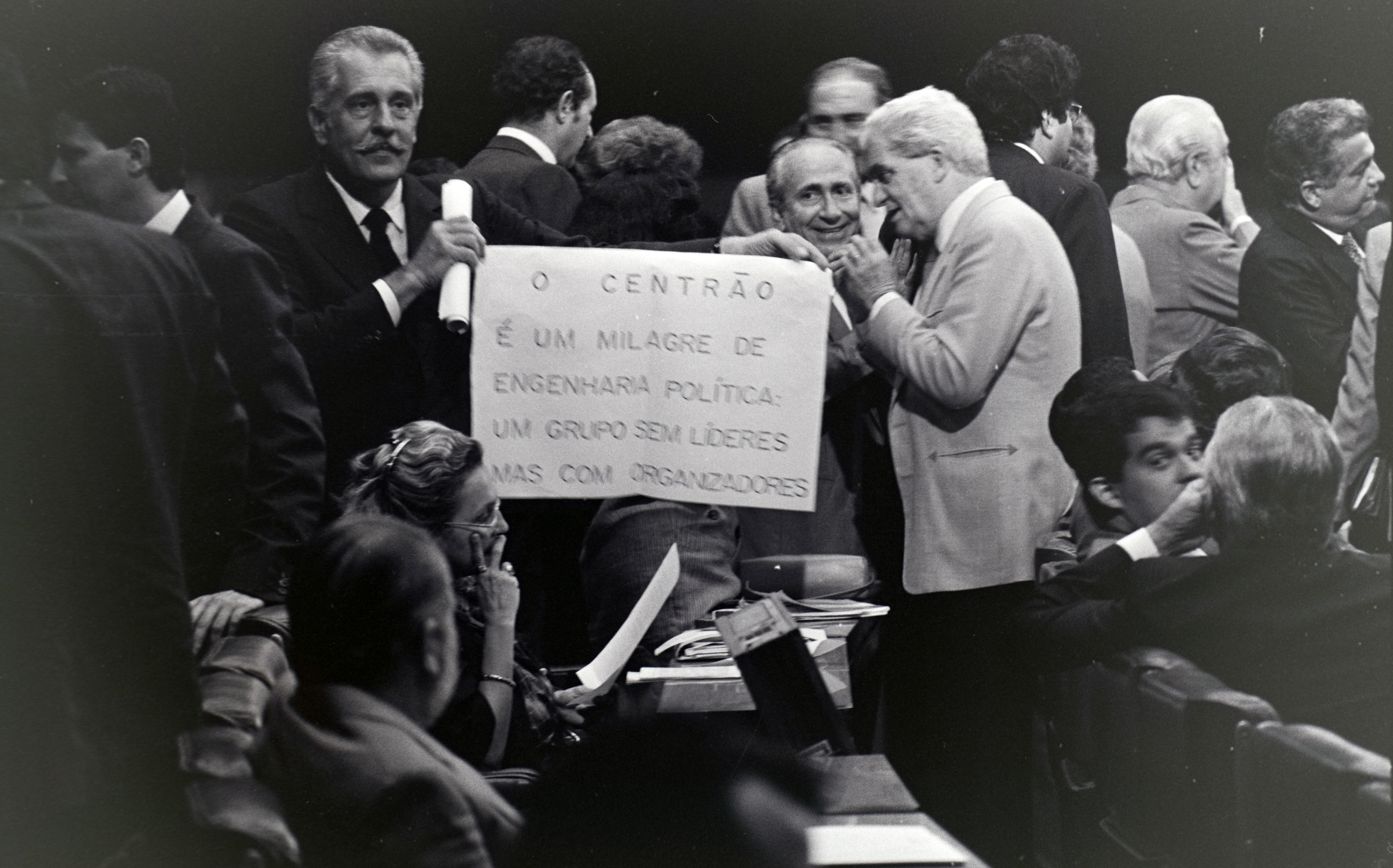
Federal Deputies Ricardo Fiúza and Amaral Netto carry a sign during the 1987 National Constituent Assembly, which reads: "O Centrão é um milagre de engenharia política. Um grupo sem líderes mas com organizadores". ("The Centrão is a miracle of political engineering. A group without leaders but with organizers.")

In Brazilian politics, the Centrão ([se᷉'tɾɐ᷉w᷉], lit. 'big centre') refers to a group of political parties that do not have a specific or consistent ideological orientation and aim at ensuring proximity to the executive branch in order to guarantee advantages and allow them to distribute privileges through clientelistic networks. Despite its name, the Centrão is not a centrist political group, generally composed of congress members from the "lower clergy" and big tent parties, who act according to their own interests, linked to cronyism and logrolling, instead of a clear ideological program. Over the years, the Centrão has become the political kingmaker in Brazil.

== History ==
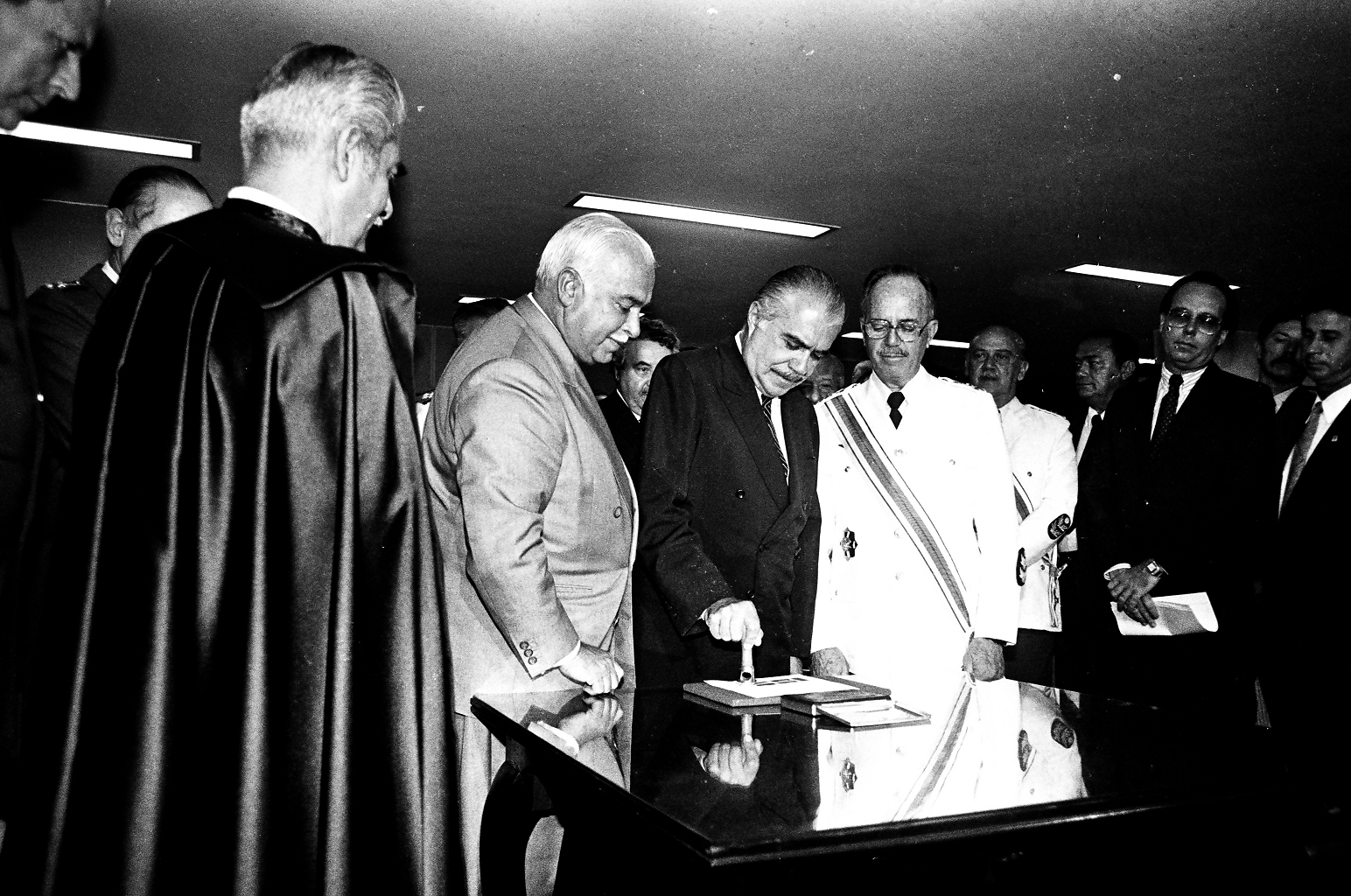
President of the Federal Senate and the Liberal Front Party (PFL) — successor of ARENA — Antônio Carlos Magalhães signs the Constitution of Brazil together with President of Brazil José Sarney from the Brazilian Democratic Movement Party (PMDB)

The term has its origin in the 1987 Constituent Assembly, being used to designate a group of parties with a center-right profile that united to support then-president José Sarney with the objective of fighting the proposals of Ulysses Guimarães' supporters — accused of being progressive — for the text of the new Constitution. Five parties made up the Centrão at that time: the PFL, PL, PDS, PDC and PTB, as well as parts of the PMDB. The centrist congressmen managed to change the way the text was approved by negotiating support in exchange for positions and benefits. On June 2, 1988, they also managed to approve Sarney's five-year term.

The Centrão would gain prominence again with the formation of the "blocão" (big bloc), a group created in 2014 by Eduardo Cunha, then leader of the PMDB, due to the dissatisfaction of the ruling base deputies with President Dilma Rousseff, who paid little attention to political articulation with the parliamentarians. The blocão brought together eight parties (PSC, PP, PROS, PMDB, PTB, PR, and Solidarity), which totaled 242 congressmen (47% of the Chamber). Cunha's influence over this group of deputies would result in his election in first round to the presidency of the Chamber of Deputies in February 2015. The group would become the main political force in the Chamber of Deputies and a grouping for the so-called "BBB Bench".

From then on, the Centrão would play a key role in the impeachment of Dilma Rousseff, removed from office in May 2016, and in making important decisions for the Michel Temer government. During the impeachment process the group would count on thirteen parties: PP, PR, PSD, PTB, PRB, PSC, PROS, SD, PEN, PTN, PHS, PSL, and AVANTE; all of them, except the SD, were part of the base of support to the Dilma Rousseff government, and most of them had ministers in the PT governments. In Temer's government, on the other hand, the group would act to block the two criminal charges against the president, avoid a probable removal from office, and approve his reforms through bargaining, such as the distribution of positions and promises of ministries, the release of parliamentary amendments, funds and bills, and other benefits.

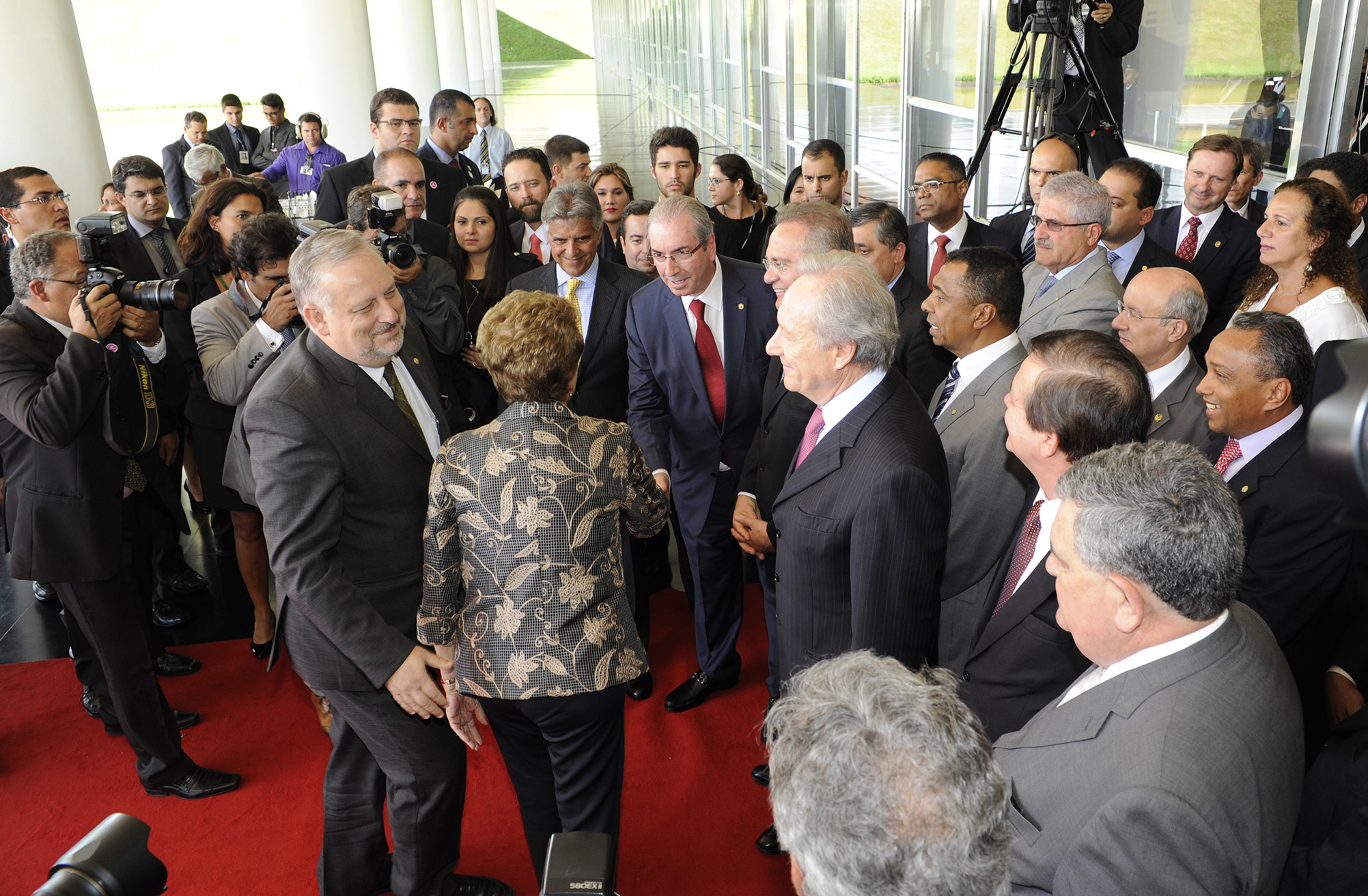
President Dilma Rousseff (PT) shakes hands with President of the Chamber of Deputies Eduardo Cunha (PMDB-RJ)

=== 2018 elections ===
In the 2018 elections, the PSDB presidential candidate, Geraldo Alckmin, put together a coalition with parties from the Centrão to get more time for electoral propaganda.

After the elections, one of the parties of the Centrão, the MDB (formerly PMDB), had a reduction in Federal Senate seats. The former president, Eunício Oliveira, came third in Ceará, Senator Edison Lobão, and former Ministers of Mines and Energy, Garibaldi Alves, former Minister of Tourism, and Romero Jucá did not get reelected.

In the Chamber of Deputies, with the influence of presidential candidate Jair Bolsonaro, the PSL managed to elect 52 federal deputies, which caused a considerable change in the composition of the Chamber. The MDB, until then the leader of the bloc, lost almost half of its seats compared to the 2014 election (from 66 to 34).

The centrists have reorganized themselves around the figures of congressman and mayor Rodrigo Maia (DEM-RJ), majority leader Aguinaldo Ribeiro (PP-PB), and the leader of the Progressives, congressman Arthur Lira (PP-AL). In June 2020, Arthur published an article in Folha de S.Paulo describing the Centrão as a moderating force and a guarantee of institutional predictability and governability.

Due to the significant shrinking of the bench, the PSDB (from 54 to 29) is now part of the group, joining the Democrats.

In May 2019, the Chamber of Deputies banned the use of the name "Centrão" on Chamber radio and TV, as it considered the term pejorative.

== Members ==
The following parties have generally been considered to be or have been part of the Centrão.

Party	TSE number	Coalition participation	Sources
Republicans (REP)	10	Founded in 2004 by dissidents from the Liberal Party close to Vice President José Alencar. It participated in the Lula, Rousseff, Temer and Bolsonaro governments. Supported Bolsonaro's re-election campaign in 2022. Nominally right-wing.	
Progressives (PP)	11	Founded in 1995 as a merger between the PPR and the PP as the Brazilian Progressive Party, it is the direct descendant of the National Renewal Alliance and the Social Democratic Party. It supported the Cardoso, Lula, Rousseff and Bolsonaro governments. Supported Bolsonaro's re-election campaign in 2022. Nominally centre-right/right-wing.	
Brazilian Labour Party (PTB)	14	Founded in 1979 to continue the line of the former PTB against the PDT after redemocratization. It participated in the Figueiredo, Sarney, Cardoso, Lula, Temer and Bolsonaro governments. Originally centrist, the party shifted strongly to the right since the government of Bolsonaro. It did not endorse Bolsonaro in the first round of the 2022 election, but did endorse him in the second round. Announced plans to merge with Patriota later in the year, with the merger made official in November 2023.	
Brazilian Democratic Movement (MDB)	15	Founded in 1980 as a big tent liberal-democratic movement against the military dictatorship, it participated in the Sarney, Franco, Cardoso, Lula, Rousseff and Temer governments. It adopted a formal position of independence from the Bolsonaro government, even with affiliates in the leadership of the parliamentary government benches. Supported Simone Tebet's campaign in 2022, but was neutral for the second round between Lula and Bolsonaro.	
We Can (PODE)	19	Founded in 1995 as the National Labor Party, it was part of the Rousseff and Bolsonaro governments. Supported Simone Tebet's campaign in 2022, but was neutral for the second round after her elimination. Nominally centre-right.	
Social Christian Party (PSC)	20	Founded as a centre-right Christian-democratic party in 1985, it participated in the Collor, Rousseff and Bolsonaro governments. It shifted further to the right during the term of the Bolsonaro government. It did not endorse Bolsonaro in the first round of the 2022 election, but did endorse him in the second round. Merged into Podemos in 2023.	
Liberal Party (PL)	22	Founded in 2006 as the Party of the Republic by a merger between the PL and the PRONA, it participated in the Sarney, Lula, Rousseff, Temer and Bolsonaro governments. Now Bolsonaro's primary party, and became the largest party in Congress in 2022. Nominally right-wing.	
Act (AGIR)	36	Founded in 1985 as the Youth Party, it elected President Fernando Collor de Mello under the name "National Reconstruction Party" and participated in his government. Renamed the Christian Labor Party, it participated in the Rousseff government and, in 2021, attempted to gain the affiliation of Bolsonaro prior to his re-election campaign. It took on its current name in 2022. During the 2022 election, it endorsed Lula's candidacy. Nominally centre-right.	
Brazil Union (UNIÃO)	44	Founded in 2021 as a merger between Democratas and PSL. In terms of the Democratas, while still called the Liberal Front Party, it supported the Sarney, Collor, Itamar, Cardoso and Temer governments. The PSL sheltered the social-liberal Livres movement until Jair Bolsonaro joined the party in 2017, remaining with it until 2019. Both parties went on to be in a formal position of independence from the government, even with affiliates in ministries and in the leadership of parliamentary government benches. Supported Soraya Thronicke's candidacy in 2022 and stayed neutral for the second round. Nominally centre-right/right-wing.	
Patriot (PATRI)	51	Founded in 2011 as the National Ecologist Party in an attempt to attract Marina Silva's group. It joined the Muda Brasil coalition led by Aécio Neves in 2014. During the 2020 municipality elections, it hosted candidacies linked to the MBL, such as that of Arthur do Val. In 2021, attempted to gain the affiliation of Bolsonaro prior to his re-election campaign. Originally a centre-right green conservative party, it has since shifted sharply to the right and away from environmentalism during the Bolsonaro government. Did not support any candidate in 2022. Announced plans to merge with the Brazilian Labour Party later in the year, with the merger made official in November 2023.	
Social Democratic Party (PSD)	55	Founded in 2011 by Democratas and Brazilian Democratic Movement Party dissidents led by São Paulo Mayor Gilberto Kassab. It supported the Rousseff and Temer governments. It adopted a formal position of independence from the Bolsonaro government, even with affiliates in ministries. Did not support any candidate in 2022. Nominally centrist.	
Forward (AVANTE)	70	Founded in 1989 as the Labour Party of Brazil by dissidents from the PTB. It joined the Muda Brasil coalition led by Aécio Neves in 2014 and supported Ciro Gomes' presidential candidacy in 2018 and Lula's candidacy in 2022.	
Solidarity (SD)	77	Founded in 2012 by PDT dissidents led by federal deputy Paulo Pereira da Silva. It was part of the Muda Brasil coalition led by Aécio Neves in 2014 and supported the presidential candidacy of Geraldo Alckmin in 2018 and Lula's candidacy in 2022. Nominally centrist/centre-left.	
Republican Party of the Social Order (PROS)	90	Founded in 2010, later joined by brothers Ciro and Cid Gomes. It participated in the Rousseff government and supported Fernando Haddad's presidential candidacy in 2018 and Lula's candidacy in 2022. Centrist. Merged into Solidarity in 2023.	
