= 2018 Brazilian general election =

- Presidential election
- 7 October 2018 (first round); 28 October 2018 (second round)
- Opinion polls
- Turnout: 79.67% (first round, ▼0.94 pp); 78.70% (second round, ▼0.20 pp)
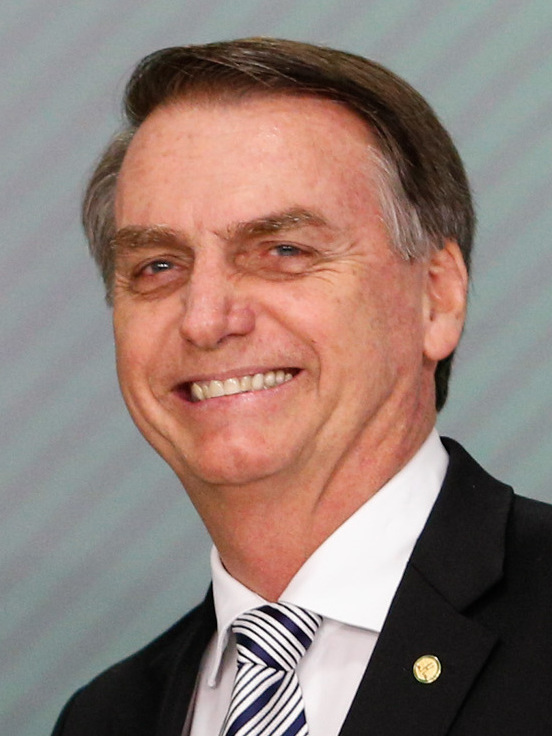

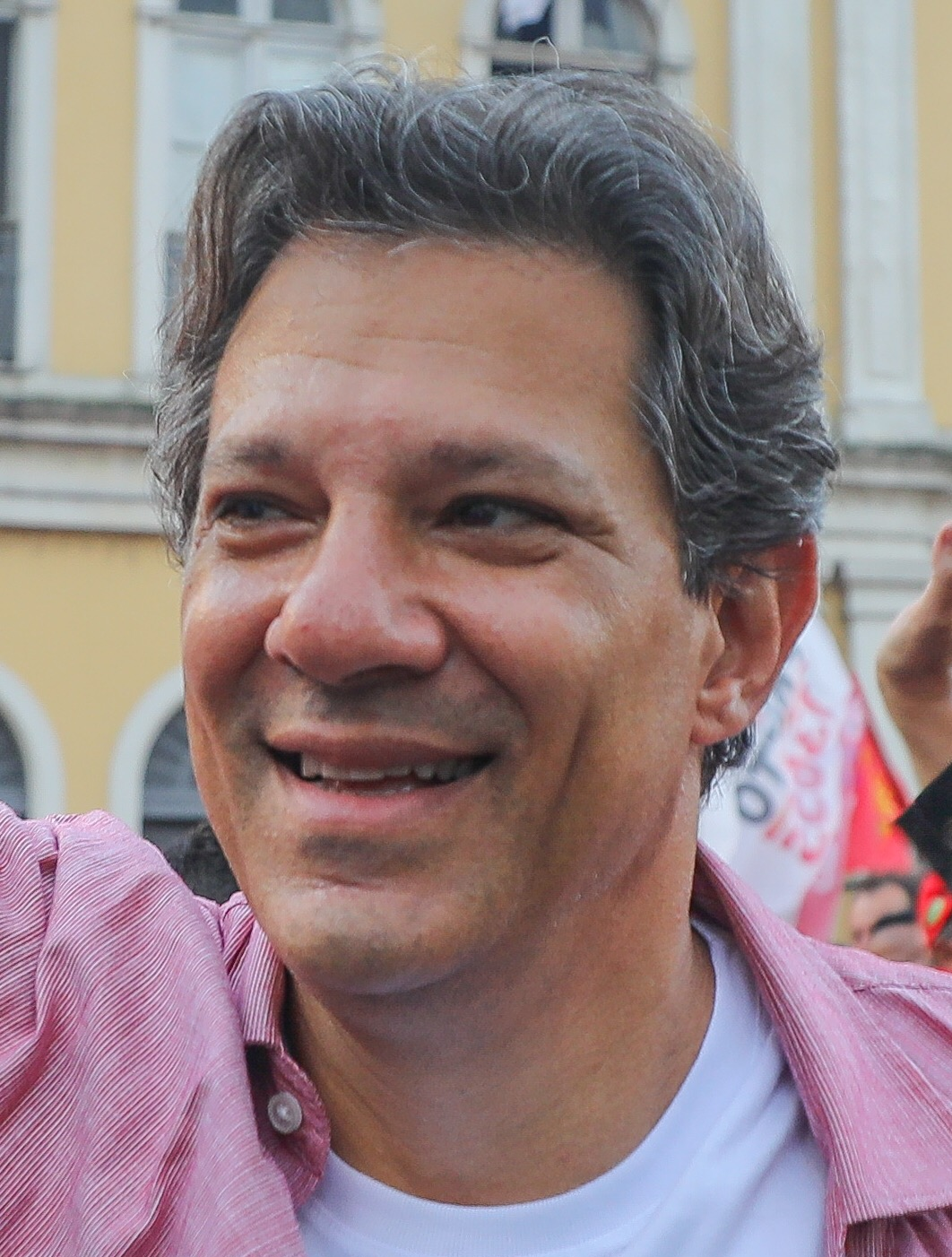
Candidate	Jair Bolsonaro	Fernando Haddad
Party	PSL	PT
Alliance	Brazil Above Everything, God Above Everyone	The People Happy Again
Running mate	Hamilton Mourão (PRTB)	Manuela d'Ávila (PCdoB)
Popular vote	57,797,847	47,040,906
Percentage	55.13%	44.87%
- Presidential election results
President before election
Michel Temer
MDB
Elected President
Jair Bolsonaro
PSL
- Chamber of Deputies
- All 513 seats in the Chamber of Deputies; 257 seats needed for a majority
Party	Leader	Vote %	Seats	+/–
PSL	Fernando Francischini	11.65	52	+51
PT	Paulo Pimenta	10.30	56	−13
PSDB	Nilson Leitão	6.01	29	−25
PSD	Domingos Neto	5.85	34	−2
PP	Arthur Lira	5.57	37	−1
MDB	Baleia Rossi	5.53	34	−32
PSB	Tadeu Alencar	5.48	32	−2
PR	José Rocha	5.31	33	−1
PRB	Celso Russomanno	5.08	30	+9
DEM	Rodrigo Garcia	4.66	29	+8
PDT	André Figueiredo	4.61	28	+9
PSOL	Chico Alencar	2.83	10	+5
NOVO	None	2.79	8	New
PODE	Diego Garcia	2.28	11	+7
PROS	Felipe Bornier	2.08	8	−3
PTB	Jovair Arantes	2.06	10	−15
Solidariedade	Wladimir Costa	1.99	13	−2
Avante	Luis Tibé	1.88	7	+6
PSC	Gilberto Nascimento	1.80	8	−5
PV	José Luiz Penna	1.62	4	−4
PPS	Alex Manente	1.62	8	−2
Patriota	Júnior Marreca	1.46	5	+3
PHS	Marcelo Aro	1.45	6	+1
PCdoB	Orlando Silva	1.35	9	−1
PRP	None	0.87	4	+1
REDE	João Derly	0.83	1	New
PMN	None	0.64	3	0
PTC	None	0.61	2	0
PPL	Uldurico Júnior	0.39	1	+1
DC	None	0.38	1	−1
This lists parties that won seats. See the complete results below.
Chamber of Deputies election result
- Senate
- 54 of the 81 seats in the Senate
Party	Leader	Vote %	Seats	+/–
PT	Lindbergh Farias	14.46	6	−6
PSDB	Paulo Bauer	11.85	8	−2
PSL	None	11.33	4	New
MDB	Simone Tebet	7.47	12	−6
DEM	Ronaldo Caiado	5.38	6	+1
PSB	Antônio Carlos Valadares	4.80	2	−5
PSD	Omar Aziz	4.79	7	+4
PDT	Acir Gurgacz	4.52	5	−3
PP	Ana Amélia Lemos	4.39	6	+1
REDE	Randolfe Rodrigues	4.18	5	New
PODE	Alvaro Dias	3.21	5	+5
PHS	None	2.47	2	New
PSC	None	2.41	1	+1
Solidariedade	None	2.34	1	0
PR	Vicente Alves	1.83	2	−2
PPS	Cristovam Buarque	1.72	2	New
PRP	None	1.15	1	+1
PTB	Armando Monteiro	1.11	3	0
PCdoB	Vanessa Grazziotin	0.98	0	−1
PRB	Eduardo Lopes	0.88	1	0
PROS	Hélio José	0.80	1	0
PTC	Fernando Collor	0.13	1	+1
This lists parties that won seats. See the complete results below.
Senate election result

Official 2018 elections logo

General elections were held in Brazil on 7 October 2018 to elect the president, National Congress and state governors. As no candidate in the presidential election (and for the gubernatorial election in some states) received more than 50% of the vote in the first round, a runoff round was held of those offices on 28 October. On that day, right-wing outsider candidate Jair Bolsonaro defeated leftist Fernando Haddad and was elected President of Brazil.

The election occurred during a tumultuous time in Brazilian politics. Narrowly re-elected in 2014, President Dilma Rousseff of the centre-left Workers' Party (PT), which had dominated Brazilian politics since 2002, was impeached in 2016. Replacing her was her Vice President, Michel Temer of the centre-right Brazilian Democratic Movement Party. Temer, whose age of 75 at inauguration made him the oldest to ever take office, broke sharply with his predecessor's policies and amended the constitution to freeze public spending. He was extraordinarily unpopular, reaching an approval rating of 7% versus 76% in favor of his resignation. Despite mass demonstrations against his governance, including a 2017 general strike and a 2018 truck drivers' strike, Temer refused to step down and served the duration of his term in office. Due to being convicted of breaking campaign finance laws, Temer was ineligible to run in 2018.

The candidacy of Jair Bolsonaro, a controversial federal deputy from Rio de Janeiro known for his far-right politics and defense of the former Brazilian military dictatorship, overshadowed other conservative candidates. Noted for his vehement opposition to abortion and same-sex marriage, Bolsonaro joined the small Social Liberal Party (PSL) to mount his bid for the presidency, shifting the party's ideology in favor of social conservatism and nationalism. Bolsonaro benefited from opposition to the former PT government and ran in favor of expanding gun ownership in response to high crime, legalizing the death penalty, and the privatization of state-owned companies. For the position of Vice President, Bolsonaro chose Hamilton Mourão, a conservative retired general in the Brazilian Army. During the campaign, Bolsonaro was the subject of widespread protests for his homophobic, racist, and misogynistic beliefs. Former Governor of São Paulo Geraldo Alckmin, who ran as a member of the previously dominant centre-right Brazilian Social Democracy Party (PSDB), received the worst result for a presidential nominee of his party in Brazilian history.

Former president Lula da Silva, who left office in 2011 with high approval ratings, intended to run for president as the candidate of the PT with former mayor of São Paulo Fernando Haddad as his running-mate. Polling taken during the campaign found Lula as the favorite in both the first and second rounds of the election. However, Lula's 2017 conviction on corruption charges barred him from running. Haddad, who was largely unknown to Brazilian voters at the time, was chosen to run in his place, with Communist Party of Brazil (PCdoB) deputy Manuela d'Avila of Rio Grande do Sul serving as his running mate. His major opponent on the left was Ciro Gomes, a mainstay of Brazilian politics who ran a centre-left campaign as a member of the Democratic Labour Party (PDT). Following Haddad's advancement to the second round, Ciro did not endorse his campaign, though he did signal opposition to Bolsonaro.

The campaign was marked by political violence, with Bolsonaro being a victim of a stabbing attack at a campaign rally in Minas Gerais and supporters of both Haddad and Bolsonaro falling victim to politically-motivated attacks. Fake news spread on popular messaging app WhatsApp was a focal point of election coverage, with disinformation spread on the app being blamed for influencing voting intentions. In the first round of the election, Bolsonaro received approximately 46% of the vote to Haddad's 29%, with Ciro coming in third place with over 12% of the vote. In the second round, Bolsonaro defeated Haddad by approximately ten percentage points, with the deputy receiving over 55% of the vote to less than 45% for Haddad. Bolsonaro took office on 1 January 2019 as President of Brazil. As of 2026, it is the only presidential election in the 21st century that the PT has lost.

== Background ==
The 2014 elections saw Workers' Party candidate Dilma Rousseff reelected as President in the second round with 51.6% of the vote, defeating Aécio Neves of the Brazilian Social Democracy Party who received 48.4% of the vote. Rousseff had first been elected in the 2010 elections, succeeding her political mentor, Luiz Inácio Lula da Silva, who was in office from 2003 until 2011.

However, on 3 December 2015, impeachment proceedings against Rousseff were officially accepted by the Chamber of Deputies. On 12 May 2016, the Federal Senate temporarily suspended Rousseff's powers and duties for up to six months or until the Senate reached a verdict: to remove her from office if found guilty or to acquit her from the crimes charged. Vice President Michel Temer, of the Brazilian Democratic Movement Party, assumed her powers and duties as Acting President of Brazil during the suspension. On 31 August 2016, the Senate voted 61–20 in favor of impeachment, finding Rousseff guilty of breaking budgetary laws and removing her from office. Critics of the impeachment saw it as a legislative coup d'état. Vice President Temer succeeded Rousseff as the 37th President of Brazil. His government implemented policies that contradicted the platform on which Rousseff's Workers Party had been elected, in one of the most controversial and heated political periods of modern Brazilian history.

Temer was barred from running for a full term in 2018. He had been convicted of campaign law violations in 2016, and was banned from holding any political office for eight years. He was likely ineligible for a full term in any case due to the manner in which constitutional provisions on term limits are worded. The constitution stipulates that if the Vice President becomes Acting President for any reason, it counts toward the limit of two consecutive terms. This applies even when the Vice President becomes Acting President whenever the President is abroad.

== Electoral system ==
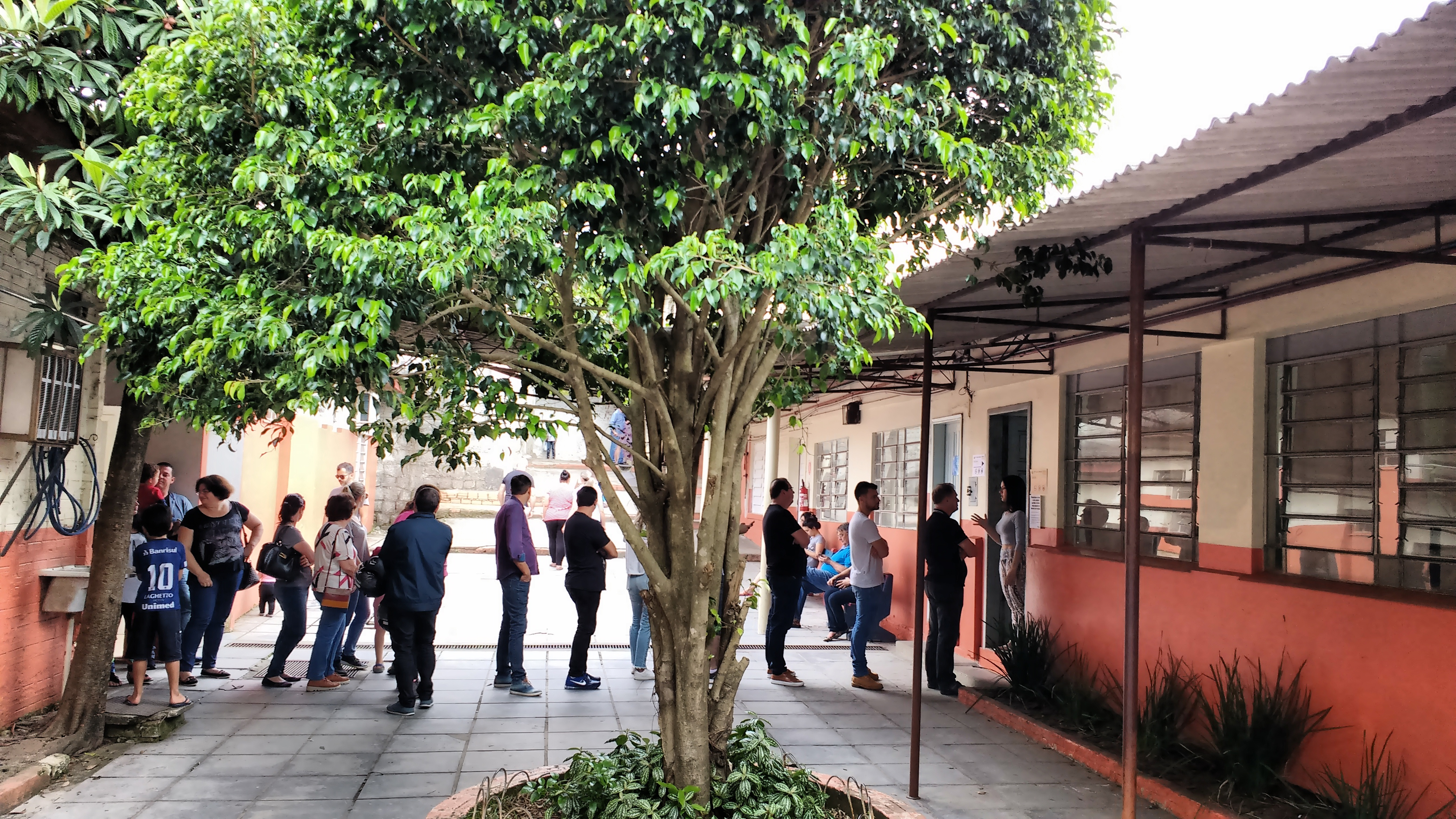
Voters lined up waiting for their turn to vote in Santa Maria, Rio Grande do Sul

Voting in Brazil is allowed for citizens over 16 years of age and mandatory for those between 18 and 70 years of age. Those who do not vote in an election and do not later present an acceptable justification (such as being away from their voting location at the time) must pay a fine of 3.51 BRL (equivalent to 0.90 USD in October 2018). Brazilian citizens residing abroad only vote for president.

=== Presidential elections ===
The president and the vice president of Brazil are elected using the two-round system. Citizens may field their candidacies for the presidency, and participate in the general elections, which are held on the first Sunday in October (in this instance, 7 October 2018). Candidates receiving more than 50% of the overall vote are declared elected. If the 50% threshold is not met by any candidate, a second round of voting is held on the last Sunday in October (in this instance, 28 October 2018). In the second round, only the two most-voted candidates from the first round may participate. The winner of the second round is elected President of Brazil. Candidates for president run for office jointly with a candidate for vice-president, and the vice-president is elected as a consequence of the election of the president.

=== Gubernatorial elections ===
The governors and vice governors of all states and of the Federal District are elected in the same way as the president, using two rounds of voting if necessary.

=== Congressional elections ===
==== Federal Senate elections ====
In 2018, two-thirds of the 81 members of the Federal Senate were elected for a term of 8 years in office, the other third having been elected in 2014. Two candidates are elected from each of the states and Federal District using majority block voting, with voters able to cast two votes each.

==== Chamber of Deputies elections ====
All 513 members of the Chamber of Deputies (federal deputies) are elected, with candidates elected from 27 multi-member constituencies corresponding to the states and Federal District, varying in size from eight to 70 seats. The Chamber elections are held using open list proportional representation, with seats allocated using the simple quotient.

=== Legislative Assemblies elections ===
All members of the State Legislative Assemblies (state deputies) and of the Federal District Legislative Chamber (district deputies), varying in size from 24 to 94 seats, will be elected. These elections are also held using open list proportional representation, with seats allocated using the simple quotient.

== Presidential candidates ==
=== Candidates in runoff ===
Party	Presidential candidate		Vice presidential candidate (Note: Same party as the presidential candidate, unless mentioned in parentheses)		Coalition
Workers' Party (PT 13)	Fernando Haddad	Fernando Haddad (campaign); Mayor of São Paulo (2013–2017); Minister of Education (2005–2012)	Manuela d'Ávila	Manuela d'Ávila (PCdoB); State Deputy of Rio Grande do Sul (2015–2019); Federal Deputy for Rio Grande do Sul (2007–2015)	The People Happy Again: Workers' Party; Communist Party of Brazil (PCdoB); Republican Party of the Social Order (PROS)
Social Liberal Party (PSL 17)	Jair Bolsonaro	Jair Bolsonaro (campaign); Federal Deputy for Rio de Janeiro (1991–2019)	Hamilton Mourão	Hamilton Mourão (PRTB)	Brazil Above Everything, God Above Everyone: Social Liberal Party (PSL); Brazilian Labour Renewal Party (PRTB)

=== Candidates failing to make runoff ===
Party	Presidential candidate		Vice presidential candidate		Coalition
Democratic Labour Party (PDT 12)	Ciro Gomes	Ciro Gomes (campaign); Federal Deputy for Ceará (2007–2011); Minister of National Integration (2003–2006); Governor of Ceará (1991–1994)	Kátia Abreu	Kátia Abreu; Minister of Agriculture, Livestock and Supply (2015–2016); Senator for Tocantins (2007–2023)	Sovereign Brazil: Democratic Labour Party (PDT); Avante
Brazilian Democratic Movement (MDB 15)	Henrique Meirelles	Henrique Meirelles; Minister of Finance (2016–2018); President of the Central Bank (2003–2011)	Germano Rigotto	Germano Rigotto; Governor of Rio Grande do Sul (2003–2007)	This is the Solution: Brazilian Democratic Movement (MDB); Humanist Party of Solidarity (PHS)
United Socialist Workers' Party (PSTU 16)	Vera Lúcia Salgado	Vera Lúcia Salgado	Hertz Dias	Hertz Dias	—N/a
Sustainability Network (REDE 18)	Marina Silva	Marina Silva; Minister of Environment (2003–2008); Senator for Acre (1995–2011)	Eduardo Jorge	Eduardo Jorge (PV); Federal Deputy for São Paulo (1986–2003)	United to Transform Brazil: Sustainability Network (REDE); Green Party (PV)
Podemos (PODE 19)	Alvaro Dias	Alvaro Dias; Senator for Paraná (1999–2023)	Paulo Rabello de Castro	Paulo Rabello de Castro (PSC); Chair of the Brazilian Development Bank (2017–2018)	Real Change: Podemos (PODE); Social Christian Party (PSC); Christian Labour Party (PTC); Progressive Republican Party (PRP)
Christian Democracy (DC 27)	José Maria Eymael	José Maria Eymael; Federal Deputy for São Paulo (1986–1995)		Hélvio Costa	—N/a
New Party (NOVO 30)	João Amoêdo	João Amoêdo (campaign)	Christian Lohbauer	Christian Lohbauer	—N/a
Brazilian Social Democracy Party (PSDB 45)	Geraldo Alckmin	Geraldo Alckmin (campaign); Governor of São Paulo (2003–2006; 2011–2018)	Ana Amélia Lemos	Ana Amélia Lemos (PP); Senator for Rio Grande do Sul (2011–2019)	To Unite Brazil: Brazilian Social Democracy Party (PSDB); Progressistas (PP); Democrats (DEM); Party of the Republic (PR); Brazilian Republican Party (PRB); Solidariedade; Brazilian Labour Party (PTB); Social Democratic Party (PSD); Popular Socialist Party (PPS)
Socialism and Liberty Party (PSOL 50)	Guilherme Boulos	Guilherme Boulos (campaign)	Sônia Guajajara	Sônia Guajajara	Let's Go Without Fear of Changing Brazil: Socialism and Liberty Party (PSOL); Brazilian Communist Party (PCB)
Patriota (Patriota 51)	Cabo Daciolo	Cabo Daciolo; Federal Deputy for Rio de Janeiro (2015–2019)	Suelene Balduino	Suelene Balduino	—N/a
Free Fatherland Party (PPL 54)	João Goulart Filho	João Goulart Filho (campaign)	Léo Alves	Léo Alves	—N/a

=== Lost in primaries or conventions ===
==== Brazilian Social Democracy Party (PSDB) ====
- Arthur Virgílio Neto, Mayor of Manaus (1989–1992, 2013–2021)

==== Democrats (DEM) ====
- Ronaldo Caiado, Senator for Goiás (2015–2023)
- Antônio Carlos Magalhães Neto, Mayor of Salvador (2013–2022); President of the Democrats (2018–)
- Mendonça Filho, Minister of Education (2016–2018)

==== Party of National Mobilization (PMN) ====
- Valéria Monteiro, journalist, model, actress, and television presenter

==== Social Democratic Party (PSD) ====
- Guilherme Afif Domingos, former Vice Governor of São Paulo (2011–15)

==== Socialism and Liberty Party (PSOL) ====
- Plínio de Arruda Sampaio Jr., economist and professor at University of Campinas; son of late 2010 nominee Plínio de Arruda Sampaio.
- Hamilton Assis, former leader of Central Única dos Trabalhadores of Bahia (1993–1996)
- Nildo Ouriques, economist and professor at UFSC
- Sônia Guajajara, indigenous activist and militant ecosocialist
Declined to be candidates

Brazilian Democratic Movement (MDB)

- Roberto Requião, Senator for Paraná (1995–2002 and 2011–2023)
- Germano Rigotto, former governor of Rio Grande do Sul (2003–07)

Brazilian Labour Renewal Party (PRTB)

- Levy Fidelix, President of the PRTB (1994–) and nominee for President in 2010 and 2014
- Antônio Hamilton Mourão, Brazilian Army general

Brazilian Republican Party (PRB)

- Flávio Rocha, CEO and Chairman of Lojas Riachuelo (2005–) and former Federal Deputy for Rio Grande do Norte (1987–95)

Brazilian Social Democracy Party (PSDB)

- João Doria, former Mayor of São Paulo (2017–18)
- Aécio Neves, Senator for Minas Gerais (2010–2018) and nominee for President in 2014
- José Serra, Senator for São Paulo (1996–1998, 2002–03, 2015–16 and 2017–2023) and nominee for President in 2002 and 2010

Brazilian Socialist Party (PSB)

- Joaquim Barbosa, former Minister of the Supreme Federal Court (2003–14)

Christian Labour Party (PTC)

- Fernando Collor de Mello, former president of Brazil (1990–92) and Senator for Alagoas (2007–2023)

Communist Party of Brazil (PCdoB)

- Manuela d'Ávila, former Federal Deputy for Rio Grande do Sul (2007–2015)
- Flávio Dino, Governor of Maranhão (2015–)

Democrats (DEM)

- Rodrigo Maia, President of the Chamber of Deputies (2016–) and Federal Deputy for Rio Grande do Sul (1999–)

Green Party (PV)

- Eduardo Jorge, former Federal Deputy for São Paulo (1987–2003)

Party of the Republic (PR)

- Josué Gomes, President of the Coteminas Company
- Magno Malta, Senator for Espírito Santo (2003–2019)

Patriota (PATRI)

- Roberto Rey, former Vice President of PATRI (2015–17)

Popular Socialist Party (PPS)

- Cristovam Buarque, Senator for the Federal District (2003–2019) and nominee for President in 2006

Progressive Party (PP)

- Blairo Maggi, Minister of Agriculture (2016-)

Social Christian Party (PSC)

- Paulo Rabello de Castro, former president of the Brazilian Development Bank (2017–18) and the Brazilian Institute of Geography and Statistics (2016–17)

Socialism and Liberty Party (PSOL)

- Chico Alencar, Federal Deputy for Rio de Janeiro (2003–)
- Marcelo Freixo, State Deputy of Rio de Janeiro (2007–)
- Luciana Genro, former Federal Deputy for Rio Grande do Sul (2003–11) and nominee for President in 2014

Solidarity (SD)

- Aldo Rebelo, former president of the Chamber of Deputies (2005–2007) and member of the Rousseff cabinet (2011–16)

Workers' Party (PT)

- Fernando Pimentel, Governor of Minas Gerais (2015–)

Other

- Silvio Santos, Owner of Grupo Silvio Santos (1958–)
- Pedro Parente, former president of Petrobras (2016–18)
- Roberto Justus, television presenter and Chairman of Grupo Newcomm (1998–)
- Luciano Huck, television presenter
- Luís Roberto Barroso, Minister of the Supreme Federal Court (2013-)

== Campaign ==
=== Rejection of Lula's candidacy for re-election ===
On 1 September, the Superior Electoral Court voted 6–1 to reject Lula's candidacy for what would be his third term based on the Lei da Ficha Limpa and his conviction on corruption charges, but approved the PT-PCdoB-PROS coalition "The People Happy Again" and the candidacy of Fernando Haddad. The Workers' Party replaced Lula with Haddad and announced former presidential candidate Manuela d'Ávila as his running mate.

=== Stabbing of Jair Bolsonaro ===
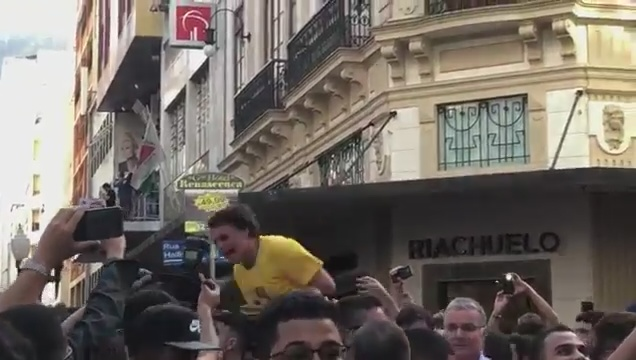
Bolsonaro being stabbed at a Juiz de Fora rally

Jair Bolsonaro was stabbed on 6 September 2018 while campaigning in the city of Juiz de Fora, Minas Gerais and interacting with supporters. Bolsonaro's son, Flávio, stated that his father's wounds were only superficial and he was recovering in hospital. Police arrested and identified the attacker as Adelio Bispo de Oliveira, who claimed that he was "ordered by God to carry out the attack". Flávio Bolsonaro later stated that the wounds inflicted seemed worse than initially thought. He tweeted about his father's condition, explaining that the perforation reached part of the liver, the lung and part of the intestine. He also stated that Bolsonaro had lost a large amount of blood, arriving at the hospital with a pressure of 10/3, but had since stabilized. Most of the other candidates in the presidential race as well as and the then-Brazilian president, Michel Temer, condemned the attack. After being stabbed, Bolsonaro did not attend any further debates.

=== Debates ===
Two debates were held on 9 and 17 August, featuring eight presidential candidates: Bolsonaro, Alckmin, Silva, Gomes, Dias, Meirelles, Boulos, and Daciolo. Lula was unable to participate in the debates. The 9 August debate was moderated by Ricardo Boechat, and the 17 August debate was moderated by Amanda Klein, Boris Casoy and Mariana Godoy.

A debate scheduled for 27 August was canceled after Jair Bolsonaro expressed his uncertainty about participating in the debates and the Workers' Party insisted on the participation of Lula, prohibited by the Electoral Justice. Bolsonaro did not participate in further debates after he was attacked on 6 September.

After a debate on 9 September moderated by Maria Lydia Flândoli, Fernando Haddad participated in all remaining debates. These occurred on 20 September (moderated by Joyce Ribeiro), 26 September (moderated by Carlos Nascimento), 30 September (moderated by Adriana Araújo and Celso Freitas), and 4 October (moderated by William Bonner).

A vice presidential debate was held on 5 September featuring four candidates; Fernando Haddad did not attend.

While several debates were scheduled for the second round, none were held. Debates planned for 12 October, 14 October, and 15 October were cancelled due to Bolsonaro's health issues. A debate scheduled for 21 October was cancelled after the campaigns were unable to agree to terms.

== Results ==
=== President ===
First Round results Municipalities won by Jair Bolsonaro: Municipalities won by Fernando Haddad: Municipalities won by Ciro Gomes:

Second Round results Municipalities won by Jair Bolsonaro: Municipalities won by Fernando Haddad:

Second round results (shaded)

Candidate	Running mate	Party	First round		Second round	
Candidate	Running mate	Party	Votes	%	Votes	%
Jair Bolsonaro	Hamilton Mourão (PRTB)	Social Liberal Party	49,277,010	46.03	57,797,847	55.13
Fernando Haddad	Manuela d'Ávila (PCdoB)	Workers' Party	31,342,051	29.28	47,040,906	44.87
Ciro Gomes	Kátia Abreu	Democratic Labour Party	13,344,371	12.47		
Geraldo Alckmin	Ana Amélia (PP)	Brazilian Social Democracy Party	5,096,350	4.76		
João Amoêdo	Christian Lohbauer	New Party	2,679,745	2.50		
Cabo Daciolo	Suelene Balduino	Patriota	1,348,323	1.26		
Henrique Meirelles	Germano Rigotto	Brazilian Democratic Movement	1,288,950	1.20		
Marina Silva	Eduardo Jorge (PV)	Sustainability Network	1,069,578	1.00		
Alvaro Dias	Paulo Rabello de Castro (PSC)	Podemos	859,601	0.80		
Guilherme Boulos	Sônia Guajajara	Socialism and Liberty Party	617,122	0.58		
Vera Lúcia	Hertz Dias	United Socialist Workers' Party	55,762	0.05		
José Maria Eymael	Hélvio Costa	Christian Democracy	41,710	0.04		
João Vicente Goulart	Léo Dias	Free Fatherland Party	30,176	0.03		
Total			107,050,749	100.00	104,838,753	100.00
Valid votes			107,050,749	91.21	104,838,753	90.43
Invalid/blank votes			10,313,159	8.79	11,094,698	9.57
Total votes			117,363,908	100.00	115,933,451	100.00
Registered voters/turnout			147,306,295	79.67	147,306,294	78.70
Source: TSE

=== By state ===
==== First round ====
Federative unit	Bolsonaro		Haddad		Gomes		Alckmin		Others	
Federative unit	Votes	%	Votes	%	Votes	%	Votes	%	Votes	%
Acre	262,508	62.24%	78,170	18.53%	21,809	5.17%	33,115	7.85%	26,176	6.21%
Alagoas	528,355	34.40%	687,247	44.75%	155,457	10.12%	58,580	3.81%	106,107	6.92%
Amapá	166,935	40.74%	134,287	32.77%	50,553	12.34%	19,241	4.70%	38,741	9.45%
Amazonas	805,902	43.48%	746,998	40.30%	138,997	7.50%	29,190	1.57%	132,504	7.15%
Bahia	1,725,140	23.41%	4,441,955	60.28%	693,273	9.41%	172,900	2.35%	335,277	4.55%
Ceará	1,061,075	21.74%	1,616,492	33.12%	1,998,597	40.95%	53,157	1.09%	150,834	3.10%
Federal District	936,494	58.37%	90,508	11.87%	266,272	16.60%	53,640	3.34%	157,603	9.82%
Espírito Santo	1,122,131	54.76%	495,868	24.20%	195,553	9.54%	79,049	3.86%	156,547	7.64%
Goiás	1,868,686	57.24%	713,535	21.86%	280,864	8.60%	146,440	4.49%	255,264	7.81%
Maranhão	817,511	24.28%	2,062,592	61.26%	282,467	8.39%	50,653	1.50%	153,648	4.57%
Mato Grosso	981,119	60.04%	404,604	24.76%	91,344	5.59%	67,498	4.13%	89,571	5.48%
Mato Grosso do Sul	769,116	55.06%	333,407	23.87%	112,296	8.04%	90,897	6.51%	91,229	6.52%
Minas Gerais	5,308,047	48.31%	3,037,957	27.65%	1,278,819	11.64%	506,490	4.61%	856,301	7.79%
Pará	1,499,294	36.19%	1,714,822	41.39%	415,593	10.03%	229,122	5.53%	283,904	6.86%
Paraíba	677,718	31.30%	984,398	45.46%	362,775	16.75%	51,334	2.37%	89,319	4.12%
Paraná	3,496,448	56.89%	1,210,974	19.70%	510,541	8.31%	220,744	3.59%	706,982	11.51%
Pernambuco	1,444,685	30.57%	2,309,104	48.87%	640,860	13.56%	77,987	1.65%	252,580	5.35%
Piauí	346,944	18.76%	1,172,147	63.40%	211,240	11.42%	47,974	2.59%	70,638	3.83%
Rio de Janeiro	5,107,735	59.79%	1,255,425	14.69%	1,300,292	15.22%	208,325	2.44%	671,616	7.86%
Rio Grande do Norte	541,448	30.21%	738,165	41.19%	399,766	22.31%	40,405	2.25%	72,469	4.04%
Rio Grande do Sul	3,353,623	52.63%	1,453,291	22.81%	724,429	11.37%	350,800	5.50%	490,293	7.69%
Rondônia	538,311	62.24%	176,107	20.36%	52,118	6.03%	37,048	4.28%	61,317	7.09%
Roraima	174,306	62.97%	49,406	17.85%	14,838	5.36%	19,231	6.95%	19,007	6.87%
Santa Catarina	2,603,665	65.82%	598,578	15.13%	264,312	6.68%	154,068	3.89%	335,160	8.48%
São Paulo (state)	12,378,012	53.00%	3,833,982	16.42%	2,650,440	11.35%	2,224,049	9.52%	2,266,296	9.71%
Sergipe	310,310	27.21%	571,234	50.09%	148,526	13.02%	45,978	4.03%	64,332	5.65%
Tocantins	337,782	44.64%	311,212	41.12%	54,262	7.17%	21,666	2.86%	31,838	4.21%
Diaspora	113,690	58.79%	19,540	10.10%	28,073	14.52%	6,668	3.45%	25,410	13.14%
Source: G1

==== Second round ====
Federative unit	Bolsonaro		Haddad	
Federative unit	Votes	%	Votes	%
Acre	294,899	77.22%	86,977	22.78%
Alagoas	610,093	40.08%	912,034	59.92%
Amapá	185,096	50.20%	183,616	49.80%
Amazonas	885,401	50.27%	875,845	49.73%
Bahia	2,060,382	27.31%	5,484,901	72.69%
Ceará	1,384,591	28.89%	3,407,526	71.11%
Federal District	1,080,411	69.99%	463,340	30.01%
Espírito Santo	1,276,611	63.06%	747,768	36.94%
Goiás	2,124,739	65.52%	1,118,060	34.48%
Maranhão	886,565	26.74%	2,428,913	73.26%
Mato Grosso	1,085,824	66.42%	549,001	33.58%
Mato Grosso do Sul	872,049	65.22%	465,025	34.78%
Minas Gerais	6,100,107	58.19%	4,382,952	41.81%
Pará	1,742,188	45.19%	2,112,769	54.81%
Paraíba	782,143	35.02%	1,451,293	64.98%
Paraná	4,224,416	68.43%	1,948,790	31.57%
Pernambuco	1,661,163	33.50%	3,297,944	66.50%
Piauí	422,095	22.95%	1,417,113	77.05%
Rio de Janeiro	5,669,059	67.95%	2,673,386	32.05%
Rio Grande do Norte	652,562	36.59%	1,131,027	63.41%
Rio Grande do Sul	3,893,737	63.24%	2,263,171	36.76%
Rondônia	594,968	72.18%	229,343	27.82%
Roraima	183,268	71.55%	72.872	28.45%
Santa Catarina	2,966,242	75.92%	940,724	24.08%
São Paulo (state)	15,306,023	67.97%	7,212,132	32.03%
Sergipe	364,860	32.46%	759,061	67.54%
Tocantins	356,684	48.98%	371,593	51.02%
Diaspora	131,671	71.02%	53,730	28.98%
Source: G1

==== Voter demographics ====
Demographic group	Bolsonaro	Haddad	% of total vote
Total vote	55	45	100
Gender
Men	60	40	47
Women	50	50	53
Age
16–24 years old	50	50	15
25–34 years old	56	44	21
35–44 years old	56	44	21
45–59 years old	54	46	24
60 and older	56	44	19
Education
Less than high school	44	56	33
High school diploma	58	42	43
Bachelor's degree or more	61	39	24
Family income
Under 2x min wage	42	58	40
2-5x min wage	61	39	38
5-10x min wage	69	31	12
Over 10x min wage	67	33	10
Region
Southeast	63	37	44
South	65	35	15
Northeast	32	68	27
Central-West	66	34	7
North	55	45	7
Source: Datafolha

=== Chamber of Deputies ===
Party	Votes	%	Seats	+/–
Social Liberal Party	11,457,878	11.65	52	+51
Workers' Party	10,126,611	10.30	56	–13
Brazilian Social Democracy Party	5,905,541	6.01	29	–25
Social Democratic Party	5,749,008	5.85	34	–2
Progressistas	5,480,067	5.57	37	–1
Brazilian Democratic Movement	5,439,167	5.53	34	–32
Brazilian Socialist Party	5,386,400	5.48	32	–2
Party of the Republic	5,224,591	5.31	33	–1
Brazilian Republican Party	4,992,016	5.08	30	+9
Democrats	4,581,162	4.66	29	+8
Democratic Labour Party	4,545,846	4.62	28	+9
Socialism and Liberty Party	2,783,669	2.83	10	+5
New Party	2,748,079	2.79	8	New
Podemos	2,243,320	2.28	11	+7
Republican Party of the Social Order	2,042,610	2.08	8	–3
Brazilian Labour Party	2,022,719	2.06	10	–15
Solidariedade	1,953,067	1.99	13	–2
Avante	1,844,048	1.88	7	+6
Social Christian Party	1,765,226	1.80	8	–5
Green Party	1,592,173	1.62	4	–4
Popular Socialist Party	1,590,084	1.62	8	–2
Patriota	1,432,304	1.46	5	+3
Humanist Party of Solidarity	1,426,444	1.45	6	+1
Communist Party of Brazil	1,329,575	1.35	9	–1
Progressive Republican Party	851,368	0.87	4	+1
Sustainability Network	816,784	0.83	1	New
Brazilian Labour Renewal Party	684,976	0.70	0	–1
Party of National Mobilization	634,129	0.64	3	0
Christian Labour Party	601,814	0.61	2	0
Free Fatherland Party	385,197	0.39	1	+1
Christian Democracy	369,386	0.38	1	–1
Brazilian Woman's Party	228,302	0.23	0	New
Brazilian Communist Party	61,343	0.06	0	0
United Socialist Workers' Party	41,304	0.04	0	0
Workers' Cause Party	2,785	0.00	0	0
Total	98,338,993	100.00	513	0
Valid votes	98,338,993	83.97		
Invalid/blank votes	18,771,737	16.03		
Total votes	117,110,730	100.00		
Registered voters/turnout	146,750,529	79.80		
Source: Election Resources

=== Senate ===
Party	Votes	%	Seats		
Party	Votes	%	Won	Total	+/–
Workers' Party	24,785,670	14.46	4	6	–6
Brazilian Social Democracy Party	20,310,558	11.85	4	9	–1
Social Liberal Party	19,413,869	11.33	4	4	New
Brazilian Democratic Movement	12,800,290	7.47	7	12	–6
Democrats	9,218,658	5.38	4	6	+1
Brazilian Socialist Party	8,234,195	4.80	2	2	–5
Social Democratic Party	8,202,342	4.79	4	7	+4
Democratic Labour Party	7,737,982	4.52	2	4	–4
Progressistas	7,529,901	4.39	5	5	0
Sustainability Network	7,166,003	4.18	5	5	New
Podemos	5,494,125	3.21	1	5	+5
Socialism and Liberty Party	5,273,853	3.08	0	0	–1
Humanist Party of Solidarity	4,228,973	2.47	2	2	New
Social Christian Party	4,126,068	2.41	1	1	+1
Solidariedade	4,001,903	2.34	1	1	0
New Party	3,467,746	2.02	0	0	New
Party of the Republic	3,130,082	1.83	1	2	–2
Popular Socialist Party	2,954,800	1.72	2	2	New
Progressive Republican Party	1,974,061	1.15	1	1	+1
Brazilian Labour Party	1,899,838	1.11	2	3	0
Communist Party of Brazil	1,673,190	0.98	0	0	–1
Brazilian Republican Party	1,505,607	0.88	1	1	0
Republican Party of the Social Order	1,370,513	0.80	1	1	0
Green Party	1,226,392	0.72	0	0	–1
Brazilian Labour Renewal Party	886,267	0.52	0	0	0
Avante	731,379	0.43	0	0	0
Free Fatherland Party	504,209	0.29	0	0	0
United Socialist Workers' Party	413,914	0.24	0	0	0
Party of National Mobilization	329,973	0.19	0	0	0
Brazilian Communist Party	256,655	0.15	0	0	0
Christian Labour Party	222,931	0.13	0	1	+1
Christian Democracy	154,068	0.09	0	0	0
Patriota	60,589	0.04	0	0	0
Brazilian Woman's Party	51,027	0.03	0	0	New
Workers' Cause Party	38,691	0.02	0	0	0
Independent	0	0.00	0	1	+1
Total	171,376,322	100.00	54	81	0
Total votes	117,111,478	–			
Registered voters/turnout	146,750,529	79.80			
Source: Election Resources, G1

== Aftermath and reactions ==
=== Americas ===
==== Argentina ====
- President Mauricio Macri congratulated Bolsonaro on his election victory, stating that, "I hope we will work together soon for the relationship between our countries and the welfare of Argentines and Brazilians."

==== Bolivia ====
- President Evo Morales expressed his congratulations, "we greet the brother people of Brazil for their democratic participation in the second round of presidential elections in which Jair Bolsonaro was elected, to whom we extend our recognition. Bolivia and Brazil are brother peoples with deep integration ties."

==== Chile ====
- President Sebastián Piñera expressed his congratulations on Twitter, "congratulations to the Brazilian people for a clean and democratic election. I congratulate Jair Bolsonaro for your great electoral triumph."

==== Colombia ====
- President Iván Duque praised Bolsonaro on Twitter. "Congratulations to Jair Bolsonaro, the new democratically elected president of Brazil. Our wish for this new stage of the neighboring country to be one of well-being and unity. We look forward to continuing our fellowship relationship to strengthen political, commercial and cultural ties."

==== Costa Rica ====
- President Carlos Alvarado using his official Twitter account expressed: "Costa Rica ratifies its willingness to work with Brazil in favor of inclusion, economic growth and respect for the rights of all people, as well as to achieve the sustainable development of the region."

==== Ecuador ====
- President Lenín Moreno expressed on Twitter, "More congratulations to the Brazilian people for this new democratic feat. Best wishes for new President Jair Bolsonaro."

==== Mexico ====
- President Enrique Peña Nieto praised Bolsonaro on Twitter. "On behalf of the people and the Government of Mexico, I congratulate Jair Bolsonaro for his election as President of the Federative Republic of Brazil, on an exemplary day that reflects the democratic strength of that country."

==== Paraguay ====
- President Mario Abdo Benítez expressed on Twitter, "congratulations to the people of Brazil and their elected president Jair Bolsonaro for this election! We want to work together for stronger democracies in the region, with strengthened institutions and always looking for the prosperity of our peoples!"

==== Peru ====
- President Martín Vizcarra congratulated Bolsonaro on his election, "I congratulate Jair Bolsonaro for his election as president of Brazil and I wish him the greatest success in his administration. I express my willingness to work together to deepen our fraternal bilateral relationship."

==== United States ====
- President Donald Trump congratulated Bolsonaro on his election victory. Trump and Bolsonaro both agreed to work side-by-side to improve the lives of the people of the United States and Brazil, and as regional leaders, of the Americas.

=== Asia ===
==== China ====
- President Xi Jinping congratulated Bolsonaro on his election, and said that his country was willing to "respect the fundamental interests" of both nations. He also congratulated the statements made by Bolsonaro shortly after winning the elections, in which he assured that Brazil will maintain ties with China, its main trading partner, regardless of its ideological differences.

=== Europe ===
==== France ====
- President Emmanuel Macron congratulated Bolsonaro on his election victory, added that France would look to continue to cooperate with Brazil on areas including environmental issues. "France and Brazil have a strategic partnership based around common values of respect and the promotion of democratic principles," added Macron in his statement.
- President of the National Rally Party Marine Le Pen praised Bolsonaro on his election victory, "Brazilians just punished the widespread corruption and terrifying crime that thrived during far left governments. Good luck to President Bolsonaro who will have to re-establish Brazil's very compromised economic, security and democratic situation."

==== Germany ====
- According to an official publication, the Chancellor Angela Merkel said she "hopes that their cooperation will continue to be based on democratic values and the rule of law. Two countries have long been linked by friendly relations and common interests."

==== Russia ====
- According to an official publication from the Kremlin, President Vladimir Putin: "praised the significant experience of mutually beneficial bilateral cooperation in various spheres that Russia and Brazil have acquired as part of their strategic collaboration" and "expressed confidence in the further promotion of the entire complex of Russian-Brazilian ties as well as constructive cooperation in the framework of the United Nations, the G20, BRICS and other multilateral organisations in the interests of the Russian and Brazilian people."

==== Italy ====
- Deputy Prime Minister Matteo Salvini praised Bolsonaro on Twitter. "In Brazil citizens expelled the left! Good job for President Bolsonaro, the friendship between our peoples and government will be even stronger".

==== Spain ====
- Prime Minister Pedro Sánchez expressed on Twitter, "The Brazilian people have decided their future for years to come. The challenges will be huge. Brazil will always count on Spain to achieve a more egalitarian and fairer Latin America, the hope that will illuminate the decisions of any ruler."

=== Middle East ===
==== Israel ====
- Prime Minister Benjamin Netanyahu congratulated Bolsonaro on his election victory, stating that, "I am confident that your election will bring great friendship between the two peoples and strengthen the ties between Brazil and Israel."

== See also ==
- Ele Não movement – protests against the candidacy of Bolsonaro
- 2018 in Brazil
- 2018 São Paulo gubernatorial election
- 2018 Rio de Janeiro gubernatorial election
- 2018 Espírito Santo gubernatorial election
