= Nildo Ouriques =

Brazilian economist

Personal details
- Born: 1959 (age 66–67) Joaçaba, Santa Catarina, Brazil
- Party: PSOL - United Socialist Workers' Party (current Brazilian Revolution)
- Other political affiliations: PT (formerly)
- Education: National Autonomous University of Mexico (doctorate)

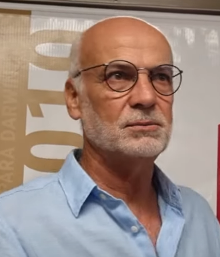
Niles Ouriques

Nildo Domingos Ouriques (born 1959) is a Brazilian economist and academic. He has served as president of the Institute for Latin American Studies (IELA) at the Federal University of Santa Catarina and as a professor of economics at the same university. Throughout his academic career, he has taught at institutions across the world, including the National University of Tucumán in Argentina, the University of Padua in Italy, the National Autonomous University of Mexico (UNAM), the Bolivarian University of Venezuela, and Simón Bolívar University in Quito, Ecuador. In 2020, Ouriques was included on a list of so-called "government detractors" in academia and journalism.

== Life and academic career ==
Ouriques was born in Joaçaba, Santa Catarina, Brazil, and lived in the city until the age of 17, when he finished high school. During his youth, Ouriques was active in the student movement against the military dictatorship. Ouriques holds a doctorate in economics from the National Autonomous University of Mexico (UNAM) and a post-doctorate degree from the University of Buenos Aires. Much of Ouriques' work focuses on the relationship between Marxism and nationalism, as well as the Marxist theory of dependence more generally.

== Political activity and views ==
Ouriques, who was a member of the left-wing Workers' Party (PT) for two decades, left the party, citing his displeasure with what he referred to as the "petucan system" (a portmanteau of petista, a member of the PT, and tucano, a member of the centre-right Brazilian Social Democracy Party, or PSDB). According to Ouriques, though the PT was born out of "workers' protest against the dictatorship", the party had succumbed to the "bourgeois order" in power. Ouriques criticized Luiz Inácio Lula da Silva for not working closely enough with President Hugo Chávez of Venezuela to create an anti-imperialist "cohesive regional bloc" during his presidency.

Ouriques is a staunch critic of the presidency of Jair Bolsonaro, arguing that Brazil's foreign policy had become that of a banana republic under his rule. He has argued that the PT and the "liberal left" are unequipped to face the threats posed by Bolsonaro's rule. Ouriques has compared Bolsonaro to Augusto Pinochet, the right-wing dictator of Chile from 1974 to 1990. Additionally, Ouriques has argued that the Bolsonaro Administration has destroyed Brazil's status as an emerging power, and has relegated the country to being a proxy for U.S. interests in the region.

Vice President Hamilton Mourão, a retired general in the Brazilian Army, has been the regular subject of criticism from Ouriques. Ouriques has said that Mourão is effectively "a man from the United States" who is fully "in tune with the United States' hemispheric security doctrine". Ouriques argues that Mourão's relative restraint in public settings compared to the more bombastic Bolsonaro makes him more dangerous than the President he serves under.

As a native of the southern state of Santa Catarina, Ouriques has spoken about the legacy of European immigration and the latifúndio system on current right-wing voting patterns in the region. Ouriques is active in the local PSOL branch in Santa Catarina, joining their launch rally for party candidates running in the 2018 election cycle.

== 2018 presidential campaign ==
In the 2018 Brazilian presidential election, Ouriques attempted to run for president as a member of the Socialism and Liberty Party (PSOL). However, he lost the party's nomination to labor leader Guilherme Boulos. Ouriques accused PSOL leadership of unfair favoritism towards Boulos.

== Selected works ==
- O colapso do figurino francês: crítica às ciências sociais no Brasil ("The Collapse of the French Costume Design: Critique of Social Sciences in Brazil") - 2014
- Dependência e Marxismo: Contribuições ao Debate Crítico Latino-Americano ("Dependency and Marxism: Contributions to the Latin American Critical Debate") - 2016
- Crítica à razão acadêmica: reflexão sobre a universidade contemporânea ("Critique of Academic Reason: Reflection on the Contemporary University") - 2017
