= Natália Boulos =

Brazilian politician (born 1987)

Member-elect of the Chamber of Deputies
- Assuming office 1 February 2027
- Constituency: São Paulo

Personal details
- Born: Natália Szermeta; 21 September 1987 (age 39) São Paulo, Brazil
- Party: PSOL
- Domestic partner: Guilherme Boulos (2009–present)
- Profession: Lawyer

Natália Szermeta (born 21 September 1987), better known as Natália Boulos, is a Brazilian politician who was elected member of the Chamber of Deputies in 2026. She has been in a relationship with fellow Socialism and Liberty Party politician Guilherme Boulos since 2009.
