= Marreca Filho =

Brazilian politician (born 1992)

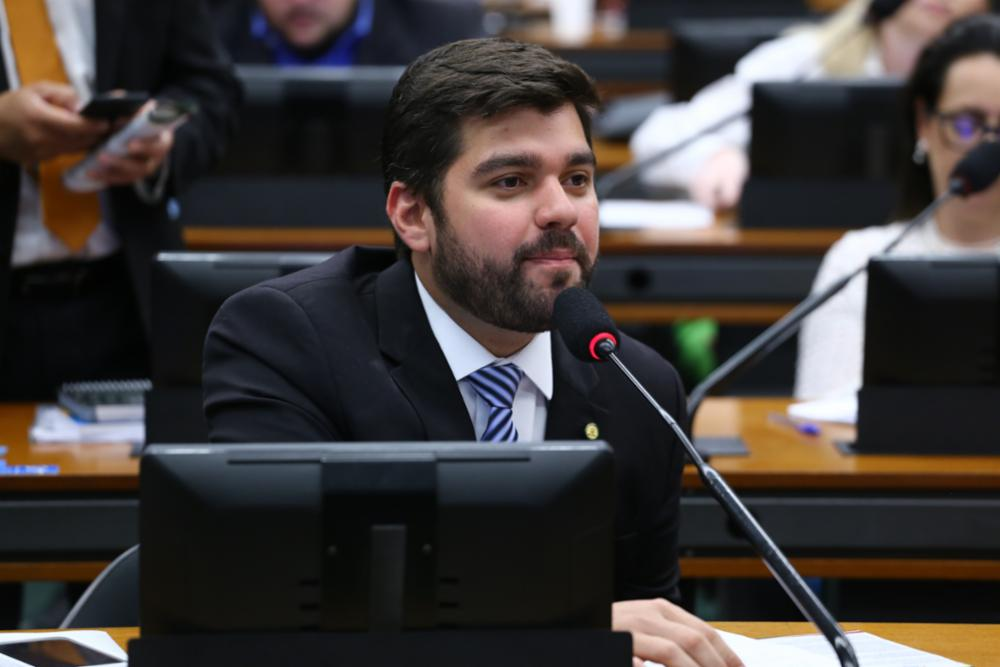

Member of the Chamber of Deputies
- Incumbent
- Assumed office 1 February 2019
- Constituency: Maranhão

Personal details
- Born: Antônio da Cruz Filgueira Neto; 25 April 1992 (age 34) São Luís, Maranhão, Brazil
- Party: PRD (since 2023)
- Other political affiliations: Patriota (2015–2023)
- Parent: Júnior Marreca (father)

Antônio da Cruz Filgueira Neto, better known as Marreca Filho (born 25 April 1992), is a Brazilian politician serving as a member of the Chamber of Deputies since 2019. He is the son of Júnior Marreca.
