= Progressistas =

Progressives Progressistas
- Abbreviation: PP
- President: Ciro Nogueira
- Founded: September 1995
- Registered: 16 November 1995
- Merger of: Progressive Party; Reform Progressive Party
- Headquarters: Senado Federal, Anexo I, 17º andar, Sl. 1.702, Brasília
- Newspaper: Gestão Progressista
- Think tank: Fundação Milton Campos
- Youth wing: Jovens Progressistas
- Women's wing: Mulheres Progressistas
- Black wing: Afro Progressistas
- Membership (2022): 1,293,592
- Ideology: Conservative liberalism
- Political position: Centre-right
- National affiliation: Progressive Union (UPB)
- Colors: Sky blue Dark blue Red (secondary)
- Slogan: Oportunidades para todos ('Opportunities for all')
- Electoral number: 11
- Federal Senate: 7 / 81
- Chamber of Deputies: 47 / 513
- Governors: 3 / 27
- Legislative Assemblies: 87 / 1,024
- Mayors: 752 / 5,568
- Municipal Chambers: 6,346 / 58,043

Website
- progressistas.org.br

Progressistas (Portuguese: [pɾo.ɡɾeˈsis.tɐs]; lit. 'Progressives', PP) is a centre-right political party in Brazil. Founded in 1995 as the Brazilian Progressive Party (Portuguese: Partido Progressista Brasileiro, PPB), it emerged from parties that were successors to ARENA, the ruling party of the Brazilian military dictatorship. A pragmatist party, and one of the core members of the Centrão bloc, it supported the governments of presidents Fernando Henrique Cardoso, Luiz Inácio Lula da Silva, Dilma Rousseff, Michel Temer and Jair Bolsonaro. Largely it was the party of the politics of Paulo Maluf, a former governor and mayor of São Paulo. Of all political parties, in corruption investigation Operation Car Wash, the Progressistas had the most convictions.

The party in recent years had fully embraced the right. In the 2018 Brazilian general election, the party supported the candidacy of Geraldo Alckmin. After the election, although they remained neutral in the second round, the party has almost fully supported the policies of Jair Bolsonaro, supporting his candidacy for president in 2022 and voting with him 93% of the time.

In 2025, the party formed the Progressive Union alliance with Brazil Union.

== History ==
First logo

Second logo

Founded in 1995, as Brazilian Progressive Party (PPB), by the union of the:

- Reform Progressive Party, founded in 1993 by Democratic Social Party and Christian Democratic Party;
- Progressive Party, founded in 1993 by the Social Labour Party and the Reform Labour Party.

The party entered in coalition with the Brazilian Social Democracy Party and the Liberal Front Party, supporting President Fernando Henrique Cardoso in the 1998 Brazilian general election.

In the 2002 general election, the party informally supported the candidacy of Ciro Gomes in the first round and formally supported José Serra in the second round.

In 2003, the party re-changed its name to the Progressive Party (PP). PP has also supported the Workers' Party-led government from 2003 to 2015.

At the parliamentary elections, held in October 2006, the party won 42 of the 513 seats in the chamber of deputies, and it has one of the 81 seats in the Senate. At the 2010 elections, PP won 41 seats in the Chamber of Deputies, and made gains in the Senate for a total of five seats. It lost an extremely close gubernatorial runoff in Roraima to the PSDB, and won no state governorships.

In the 2010 elections, alliances between moderate and left-leaning parties took place in several places, such as in Bahia, where the PP was part of the PT candidate's coalition, having even nominated its vice governor. About this type of coalition, the former mayor of São Paulo and former PT member Luísa Erundina declared, still in May 2010, that "It is sad, agonizing to see Maluf's PP with PCdoB. It's all the same."

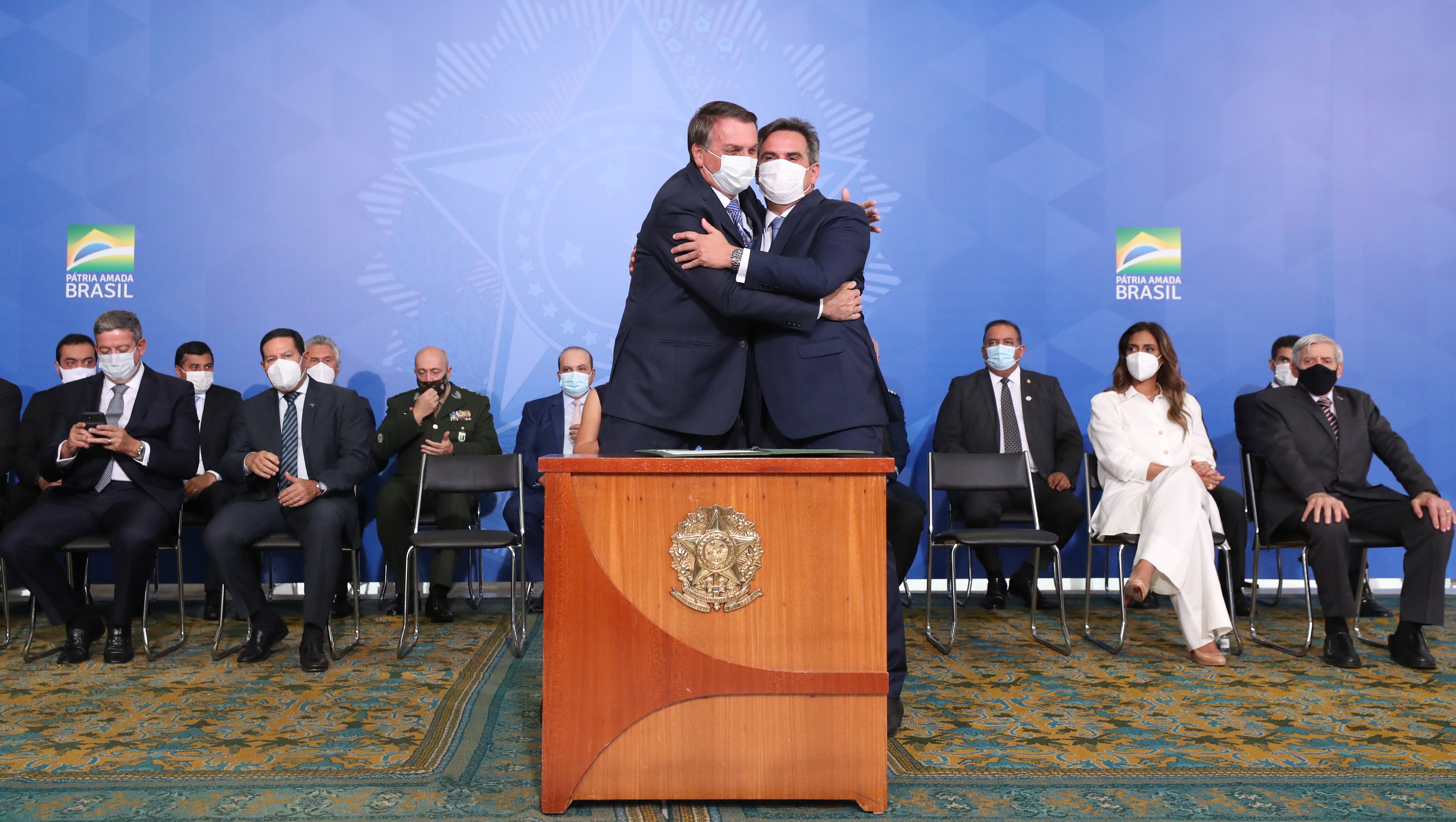
Bolsonaro and the party president Nogueira, 2021

Its most well-known politicians are Paulo Maluf, mayor and governor of São Paulo for several terms, Esperidião Amin, former governor of Santa Catarina and senator, and Francisco Dornelles, former minister of Labour and senator for the state of Rio de Janeiro.

The party has from its very beginning shown a tendency for regional division, with the section from Rio Grande do Sul state often threatening with secession, in part due to what is viewed by them as condescendence of the party's national direction towards members involved in corruption scandals, including Paulo Maluf (who has recently been discharged from his post as de facto leader of PP). The national orientation of the party has been one of close alliance with Lula's Workers' Party government (except on issues sensitive to the right wing core of PP, such as taxes), while the section of Rio Grande do Sul once more show a defiant stance in aligning itself more often with the opposition.

The Progressive Party supported the impeachment of Dilma Rousseff, splitting its alliance with the Worker's Party.

This party was most affected by the Petrobras corruption scandal, damaging its national popularity.

The party supported the candidacy of Geraldo Alckmin in 2018, but did not endorse a candidate in the second round.

After the election, the party joined a coalition with the Republicanos and the Liberal Party to support Jair Bolsonaro in government.

== Ideology ==
The party has traditionally been, like many right-wing parties in Brazil, one of pragmatism and moderation, being considered a catch-all party—making alliances with both left-wing and right-wing parties, depending on what's more convenient. The party's main positions in Congress have been that of business interests supporting lower taxation, highlighting those proposals in accordance with other economic growth principles of the left. When allied with the governments of Lula and Dilma, the party supported the Bolsa Familia program in confluence with tax cuts for economic growth.

In more recent years, however, the party has become more stridently national conservative, representing the less religious and less populist conservatism that existed in Brazil before the election of Jair Bolsonaro. Party has also moved closer to the far-right. The party supported greater economic nationalism than some of its coalition partners and is generally less in support of the military than the Liberal Party. However, in general, the party supports Bolsonarismo, and many of his cabinet members are members or have joined the party.

== Notable members ==
- Esperidião Amin, former mayor of Florianópolis, Senator, former Federal Deputy, and former Governor of Santa Catarina
- Roberto Campos, former Minister of Planning for the military dictatorship and Senator of Republic for Mato Grosso
- Severino Cavalcanti, former President of the Chamber of Deputies and deputy for Pernambuco
- Tereza Cristina, Senator of former Federal Deputy for Mato Grosso do Sul and former Minister of Agriculture
- Luis Carlos Heinze, Senator and former Federal Deputy for Rio Grande do Sul
- Paulo Maluf, former Federal Deputy, Governor, Mayor of São Paulo
- Ciro Nogueira, former Chief of Staff of the Presidency, Senator of Piauí, and National President of the Progressistas
- Antonio Denarium, governor of the state of Roraima
- Gladson Cameli, governor of the state of Acre
- Eduardo Riedel, governor of the state of Mato Grosso do Sul

== Election results ==
=== Legislative elections ===
Election	Chamber of Deputies				Federal Senate				Role in government
Election	Votes	%	Seats	+/–	Votes	%	Seats	+/–	Role in government
1998	7,558,601	11.35%	60 / 513	New	9,246,089	14.95%	3 / 81	New	Coalition
2002	6,828,375	7.81%	48 / 513	▼12	6,903,581	4.49%	1 / 81	▼2	Coalition
2006	6,662,309	7.15%	42 / 513	▼6	4,228,431	5.01%	1 / 81	0	Coalition
2010	6,330,062	6.55%	41 / 513	▼1	9,170,015	5.38%	5 / 81	▲4	Independent
2014	6,429,791	6.61%	38 / 513	▼3	1,931,738	2.16%	5 / 81	0	Coalition
2018	5,480,067	5.57%	37 / 513	▼1	7,529,901	4.39%	6 / 81	▲1	Support
2022	8,704,341	7.90%	47 / 513	▲10	7,592,391	7.47%	7 / 81	▲1	Opposition (2022–2023)
2022	8,704,341	7.90%	47 / 513	▲10	7,592,391	7.47%	7 / 81	▲1	Independent (2023–2024)
2022	8,704,341	7.90%	47 / 513	▲10	7,592,391	7.47%	7 / 81	▲1	Coalition (2025)
2022	8,704,341	7.90%	47 / 513	▲10	7,592,391	7.47%	7 / 81	▲1	Independent (2025–present)
2026	7,616,758	6.69%	41 / 513	▼6	22,082,660	10.65%	6 / 81	▼1	TBA
Sources: Election Resources, Dados Eleitorais do Brasil (1982–2006)

Preceded by 10 - REPUBLICANOS	Numbers of Brazilian Official Political Parties; 11 - PP	Succeeded by 12 - DLP (PDT)
