= Guilherme Boulos 2018 presidential campaign =

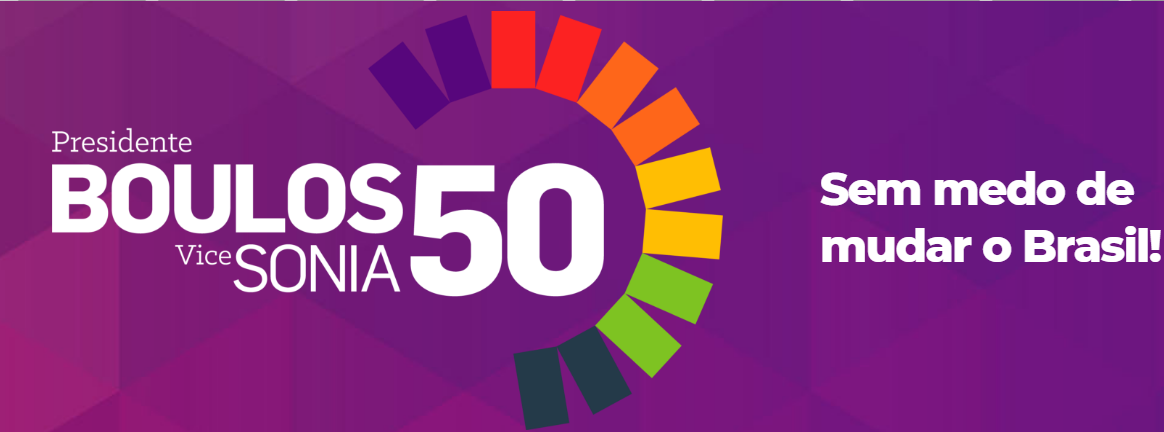
- Campaigned for: 2018 Brazilian general election
- Candidate: Guilherme Boulos; Leader of MTST; Sônia Guajajara leader
- Affiliation: Socialism and Liberty Party; Coalition party: Brazilian Communist Party
- Status: Announced: 3 March 2018; Presumptive nominee: 10 March 2018; Official nominee: 21 July 2018; Lost in the first round: 7 October 2018
- Key people: Laura Carvalho (Economic advisor)
- Slogan: Vamos sem medo de mudar o Brasil (Let's go without fear of changing Brazil)
- Website: www.vamoscomboulosesonia.com.br

The 2018 presidential campaign of Guilherme Boulos was announced on 3 March 2018 in São Paulo. Guilherme Boulos, a nationally-recognized leader of the Homeless Workers' Movement (MTST), ran as a member of the left-wing Socialism and Liberty Party.

For the position of Vice President, Boulos chose Sônia Guajajara, an indigenous activist and former competitor for the PSOL presidential nomination, as his running mate. On 20 July, a day before PSOL national convention, the Brazilian Communist Party (PCB) confirmed their support to PSOL in the presidential election.

== Candidates ==
Guilherme Boulos	Sônia Guajajara
for President	for Vice President
Leader of MTST	Indigenous leader

== Election result ==
=== Presidential elections ===
Election year	Candidate	First round		Second round	
Election year	Candidate	# of overall votes	% of overall vote	# of overall votes	% of overall vote
2018	Guilherme Boulos	617,122	0.58	Did not qualify	Did not qualify

== Endorsements ==
- Actor Wagner Moura.
- Actor Gregório Duvivier.
- Cartoonist Laerte.
