= Laura Carvalho =

Brazilian economist

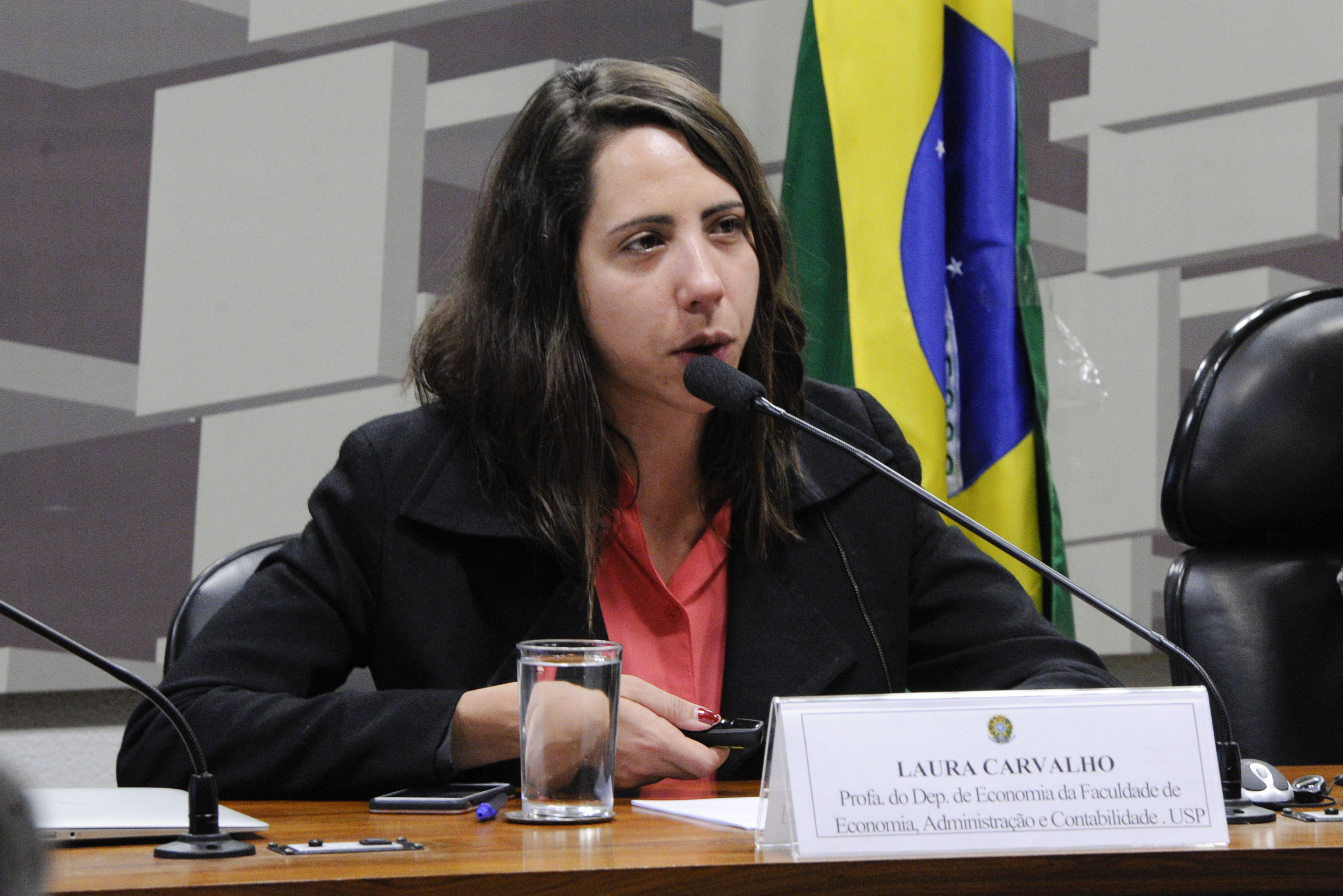
- Born: March 3, 1984 (age 42)

Academic background
- Education: Federal University of Rio de Janeiro; New School

Academic work
- Discipline: economics
- Sub-discipline: macroeconomics
- Institutions: University of São Paulo
- Main interests: economic development and income redistribution
- Notable works: Valsa Brasileira: do boom ao caos econômico

Laura Barbosa de Carvalho (born March 3, 1984) is a Brazilian economist, associate professor at the Faculty of Economics and Administration at the University of São Paulo. Carvalho has a master's degree from the Federal University of Rio de Janeiro and a doctorate from the New School. Her research area is macroeconomics, focusing on economic development and income redistribution. Since 2024, she has been Global Director of Economic and Climate Prosperity at the Open Society Foundations, with which she has been affiliated since 2022.

Her 2018 book Valsa Brasileira: do boom ao caos econômico, which analyzes the growth and subsequent crisis of the Brazilian economy starting in 2014, became one of the country's best-selling books that year. The book became a finalist for the 61st Jabuti Prize in the "Humanities" category, but did not win.

Still in 2018, she participated in the initial formulation of the economic proposals of the pre-candidate Guilherme Boulos, who was running for president for the Socialism and Liberty Party in the 2018 presidential election.

She wrote a column for newspaper Folha de S. Paulo from 2015 to 2019. As of 2020, she is a columnist for the news website Nexo.
