= João Goulart Filho =

Brazilian philosopher and politician

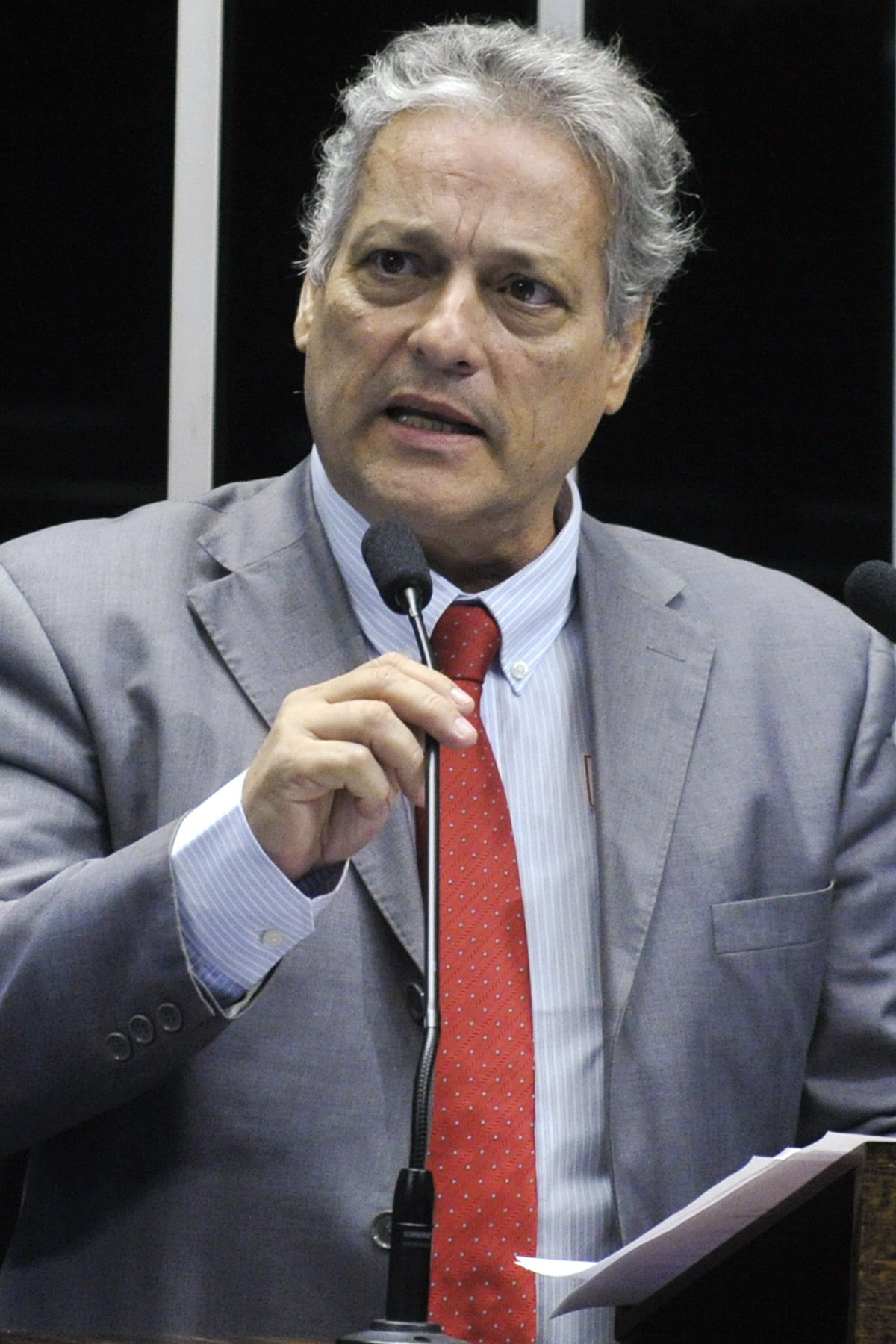

State Deputy of Rio Grande do Sul
- In office 1 February 1983 – 1 February 1987
- Constituency: At-large

Personal details
- Born: João Vicente Fontella Goulart; 22 November 1956 (age 69) Rio de Janeiro, Federal District, Brazil
- Party: PCdoB (2018–present)
- Other political affiliations: PDT (1979–2002); PGT (2002–03); PDT (2003–17); PPL (2017–18)
- Spouse: Verônica Theml Fialho
- Relations: Neusinha Brizola (cousin)
- Children: 7

João Vicente Fontella Goulart (born 22 November 1956), also known as João Goulart Filho, is a Brazilian philosopher and politician.

== Biography ==
Son (hence Filho) of former president of the Brazilian Republic João Goulart and Dona Maria Thereza, he lived his childhood and adolescence in exile in Uruguay with his parents. He was one of the founders of the Democratic Labor Party, alongside his uncle Leonel Brizola.

He is the founder and current president of Instituto João Goulart (João Goulart Institute), which aims to promote historical research and reflection on the Brazilian political process in favor of national sovereignty.

During his lifetime, he served as a deputy at the Legislative Assembly of Rio Grande do Sul in 1982, elected by PDT. In 2002, he ran for federal deputy for PGT, a party that merged with the Liberal Party together with PST in 2003. He returned to PDT, where he remained until early 2017, when he left in opposition to party support for the Rodrigo Rollemberg (PSB) government in the Federal District after the governor barred construction of the Memorial da Liberdade e Democracia Presidente João Goulart (President João Goulart Freedom and Democracy Memorial).

=== Lawsuit against the United States ===
During the promotion of his book on Brazilian territory in November 2002, Lincoln Gordon, former U.S. ambassador to Brazil in 1964, admitted that the CIA had bought Brazilian congressmen for five million dollars for the coup against João Goulart, in addition to the logistical and military support. This led the Goulart family to raise a lawsuit for moral, property and image damages against the United States, with the desire to eventually take the case to the World Court.

The 3rd Panel of the Superior Court of Justice, under the report of Nancy Andrighi's minister, would have to decide whether the act was an act of empire ("anyone who contains an order or a co-active decision of the administration for the administered, such as an expropriation decree, an interdiction order or a requisition of assets") or an act of management ("act of management are those that the administration practices without using its supremacy over the recipients. This occurs in acts purely of administration of public goods and services and in negotiations with private parties, which do not require coercion over the interested parties"). This action was an appeal after the federal judge of the 10th Circuit Court of Rio de Janeiro extinguished the case, under the interpretation that it was an act of empire.

The Federal Regional Court of the 2nd Region considered that the competence to handle the case lies with the STJ. Nancy Andrighi considered that the United States has committed an act of management, thus, welcoming the appeal. However, there was no consensus among the ministers of the 3rd Class.

In March 2008, Minister Sidnei Beneti of the Supreme Court of Justice postponed the analysis of the action. The trial was returned on 24 June 2008. The STJ finally dismissed the case, considering that the United States has immunity under Brazilian law and the STF finally denied the request in 2010, recognizing that the United States has immunity against Brazilian law.

=== Presidential campaign, 2018 ===
He was launched by the Free Fatherland Party (PPL) as a candidate for the presidency of Brazil for the 2018 elections, with Léo da Silva Alves as his running mate. His campaign aimed to resume the labor and social reforms that, according to him, "were being developed and the process was interrupted with the military coup of 1964". In the election, he received 30,176 votes (0.03% of the votes), ranking last and not qualifying for the second round.

In December 2018, since it did not reach that year's election threshold, Goulart Filho's PPL joined the Communist Party of Brazil (PCdoB).

=== 2022 elections ===
==== Pre-candidacy for the Federal District ====
On 18 December 2021, the Communist Party of Brazil launched João Vicente as a pre-candidate for the Federal District Government and Ana Prestes as a pre-candidate for the Senate. However, on 16 July 2022, it was announced that his pre-candidacy was withdrawn in favor of the party's support for pre-candidate Leandro Grass (PV).

== Published works ==
- Jango e eu: Memórias de um exílio sem volta [Jango and I: Memories of an exile with no return]. Rio de Janeiro: Civilização Brasileira. 2016. p. 350. ISBN 978-8520010921. A finalist of the Prêmio Jabuti.
- Entre Anjos e Demônios/poemas do exílio [Between Angels and Demons / Poems of Exile]. Recanto das Letras. 2018. p. 74. ISBN 9788569943655.

=== Text ===
- João Vicente Goulart (2 July 2018). "O Brasil perdeu a Guerra Fria em 1964" [Brazil lost the Cold War in 1964] (in Brazilian Portuguese).

== Performance in elections ==
Year	Election	Position	Party	Coalition	Vice	Votes	%	Results
1982	Gubernatorial in Rio Grande do Sul	State deputy	PDT	No coalition	—	32.576	–	Elected
2010	District	District deputy	PDT	No coalition	—	674	0.5%	Substitute
2018	Presidential	President	PPL	No coalition	Léo da Silva Alves (PPL)	30.176	0.03%	Not elected

Party political offices
New political party	PPL nominee for President of Brazil; 2018	Party extinct
