= João Amoêdo 2018 presidential campaign =

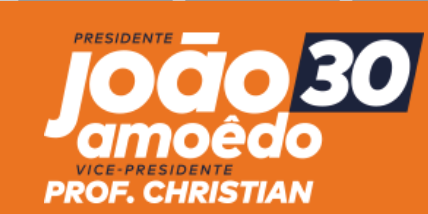
- Campaigned for: 2018 Brazilian general election
- Candidate: João Amoêdo; President of NOVO (2011-2017); Christian Lohbauer; Teacher
- Affiliation: NOVO
- Status: Announced: 18 November 2017; Official nominee: 4 August 2018; Lost in the first round: 7 October 2018
- Key people: Gustavo Franco (advisor)
- Slogan: Vamos renovar tudo (Let's renew everything)
- Website: joaoamoedo.com.br

The 2018 presidential campaign of João Amoêdo was announced on 16 November 2017. On 4 August 2018, João Amoêdo became the official nominee of his party during their convention. The running mate decision had already been taken before the convention; teacher and political scientist Christian Lohbauer was chosen to compose the ticket with Amoêdo. Before running for president, Amoêdo was president of NOVO.

== Platform ==
Amoêdo is running as a classical liberal. He proposed the privatization of all public services in the country, and supports a simplification of the tax code.

Amoêdo also came out in favor reducing the number of senators and federal deputies, ending compulsory voting and the free political advertising time. He promised to keep Bolsa Família and to make it better. He is also in favor of making 65 years the age of retirement.

== Presidential ticket ==
João Amoêdo	Christian Lohbauer
for President	for Vice President
President of NOVO (2011–2017)	Professor and political scientist

== Election result ==
=== Presidential elections ===
Election year	Candidate	First round		Second round
Election year	Candidate	# of overall votes	% of overall vote	Second round
2018	João Amoêdo	2,679,744	2.50%	Did not qualify
