= Free Fatherland Party (Brazil) =

Free Fatherland Party Partido Pátria Livre
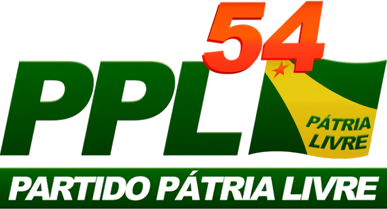
- President: Rodrigo Vieira Pinnow
- Founded: April 21, 2009
- Dissolved: December 3, 2018
- Split from: Brazilian Democratic Movement Party
- Merged into: Communist Party of Brazil
- Headquarters: SCS Q1 BL L 17, Edificio Márcia, 11° andar, sala 1114, Brasília
- Newspaper: Hora do Povo
- Membership: 39,513
- Ideology: Left-wing nationalism Scientific socialism Communism
- Political position: Left-wing to far-left
- International affiliation: Foro de São Paulo
- Colours: Green, yellow and red
- TSE Identification Number: 54

Party flag

The Free Fatherland Party (Portuguese: Partido Pátria Livre, PPL) was a left-wing political party in Brazil. Founded on April 21, 2009, by members of the Revolutionary Movement 8th October (MR-8), it advocated for scientific socialism. Its symbols were a green and yellow flag with a five-pointed red star and the inscription "Pátria Livre". PPL's identification number, as determined by the Supreme Electoral Court, was 54.

== History ==
PPL was founded mainly by members of the Revolutionary Movement 8th October (MR-8), who were joined by union leaders (linked to the Central Geral dos Trabalhadores do Brasil national trade union center), student movement activists and feminists. MR-8 was founded in 1964 from a split in the Brazilian Communist Party (PCB), under the name Dissidence of Rio de Janeiro (DI-RJ). A Marxist–Leninist guerrilla group, it promoted armed actions against the military dictatorship and advocated the establishment of a Communist regime in the country. Later, DI-RJ became MR-8 in order to pay a tribute to Che Guevara, which was captured by the CIA in Bolivia on October 8, 1967. Under the new name, the group performed its most notable action: the kidnapping of U.S. Ambassador Charles Burke Elbrick, turned into the 1997 film Four Days in September by Bruno Barreto.

Since the beginning of the democratization process, MR-8 was active inside the Brazilian Democratic Movement Party (PMDB), being an arm of quercismo in the social movements. In 2008, after considering a merger with the Workers' Party (PT), members of MR-8 decided to create a new political party. The founding act of PPL happened on April 21, 2009 and was attended by hundreds of members of PMDB, as well as several representatives of left-leaning parties, such as PT, PCdoB, PSB, PDT, PCB and the Communist Party of Bolivia. On October 3, 2011, judges of the Supreme Electoral Court unanimously granted the request for PPL's creation, making it the 29th legal political party in Brazil.

In the 2014 general election, PPL endorsed Marina Silva, who arrived 3rd with 21,32% of the votes. In the 2018 general election, PPL endorsed João Vicente Goulart (son of former president João Goulart), who got 0,03% of votes, arriving 13th.

In 2018, after failing to get enough votes to keep receiving funds from the Superior Electoral Court, the party announced that it would merge with the Communist Party of Brazil (PCdoB) and in December of that year the party signed a compromise making the merge official and the organization ceased to exist.

== Ideology ==
The political aim of the PPL was to radicalise the course followed by the Luiz Inácio Lula da Silva administration. To this end, it listed five basic objectives: the strengthening of the internal market, in order to generate more jobs; the reduction of the basic interest rate; the technological development of the country; the accomplishment of full economy; and the ensuring of good public health and education for all.

== Electoral results ==
=== Presidential elections ===
Election	Candidate	Running mate	Coalition	First round		Second round		Result
Election	Candidate	Running mate	Coalition	Votes	%	Votes	%	Result
2014	Marina Silva (PSB)	Beto Albuquerque (PSB)	PSB; PPS; PSL; PHS; PPL; PRP	22,176,619	21.3% (#3)	-	-	Lost ✗
2018	João Goulart Filho (PPL)	Léo Alves (PPL)	None	30,176	0.03% (#13)	-	-	Lost ✗
Source: Election Resources: Federal Elections in Brazil – Results Lookup
