= Fernando Haddad 2018 presidential campaign =

Fernando Haddad presidential campaign, 2018
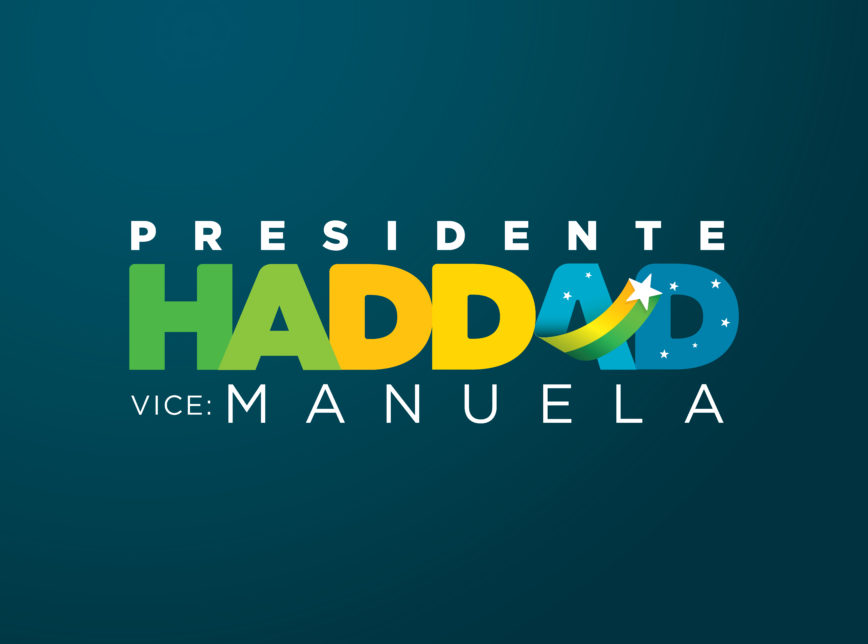
- Campaigned for: 2018 Brazilian general election
- Candidate: Fernando Haddad; Mayor of São Paulo (2013–2016); Manuela d'Ávila; State Deputy of Rio Grande do Sul (2015–2018)
- Affiliation: Workers' Party; Coalition partners Communist Party of Brazil, Republican Party of the Social Order
- Status: Official nominee: 11 September 2018; Qualified for run-off: 7 October 2018; Lost Election: 29 October 2018
- Slogan: O Brasil feliz de novo (Brazil happy again)
- Website: www.obrasilfelizdenovo.com

The 2018 presidential campaign of Fernando Haddad for the Presidency of Brazil was announced on 11 September 2018, two weeks after the candidacy of Luiz Inácio Lula da Silva, the former President of Brazil, was denied by the Superior Electoral Court for violating the Ficha Limpa (Clean Slate law). Haddad, who had been Lula's running mate, replaced him as the candidate and PCdoB state legislator Manuela d'Ávila became Haddad's running mate.

Haddad received 29% of the vote in the first round of the election, thus placing second and qualifying for a run-off against PSL candidate Jair Bolsonaro on 28 October 2018.

== Ticket ==
Fernando Haddad	Manuela d'Ávila
for President	for Vice President
Mayor of São Paulo (2013–2017)	State Deputy of Rio Grande do Sul (2015–2019)

== Election result ==
=== Presidential elections ===
Election year	Candidate	First round		Second round	
Election year	Candidate	# of overall votes	% of overall vote	# of overall votes	% of overall vote
2018	Fernando Haddad	31,342,005	29.28 #2	47,040,380	44.87%

== Endorsements ==
=== Politicians and Parties ===
- PDT (second round)
- 35th President of Brazil Luiz Inácio Lula da Silva
- 36th President of Brazil Dilma Rousseff.
- Governor of Maranhão Flávio Dino.
- Former environment minister, Acre senator and REDE presidential candidate Marina Silva (second round)
- Former President of Uruguay José Mujica.
- Former President of the Supreme Federal Court Joaquim Barbosa (second round)
- Distrito Federal Senator Cristovam Buarque (second round)
- Former Governor of São Paulo and ex-PSDB president Alberto Goldman (second round).
- Former General Prosecutor of Brazil Rodrigo Janot (second round).

=== Celebrities ===
- Actor José de Abreu.
- Singer-songwriter Zeca Baleiro.
- Actor Paulo Betti.
- Singer-songwriter Chico Buarque.
- Actress Débora Falabella.
- Singer-songwriter Gilberto Gil.
- Actress Alessandra Negrini.
- YouTuber Felipe Neto (second round).
- Actress Maria Ribeiro.
- Actress Letícia Sabatella.
- Actor and director Marcelo Serrado (second round).
- Actor, filmmaker and television host Marcelo Tas (second round).
- Singer Pabllo Vittar.
