= Júnior Marreca =

Brazilian politician (born 1970)

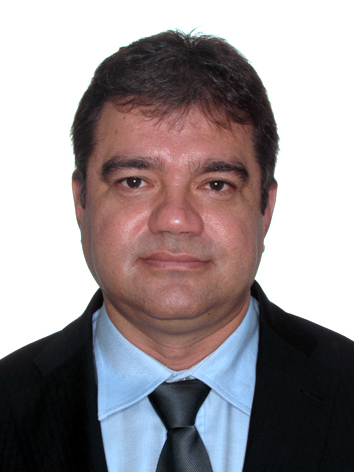
- Marreca in 2014

Member of the Chamber of Deputies
- In office 1 February 2015 – 31 January 2019
- Constituency: Maranhão

Personal details
- Born: 2 March 1970 (age 56)
- Party: Democratic Renewal Party (since 2023)
- Children: Marreca Filho

Antônio da Cruz Filgueira Júnior, better known as Júnior Marreca (born 2 March 1970), is a Brazilian politician. From 2015 to 2019, he was a member of the Chamber of Deputies. He is the father of Marreca Filho.
