= Hélio José =

Brazilian politician (born 1960)

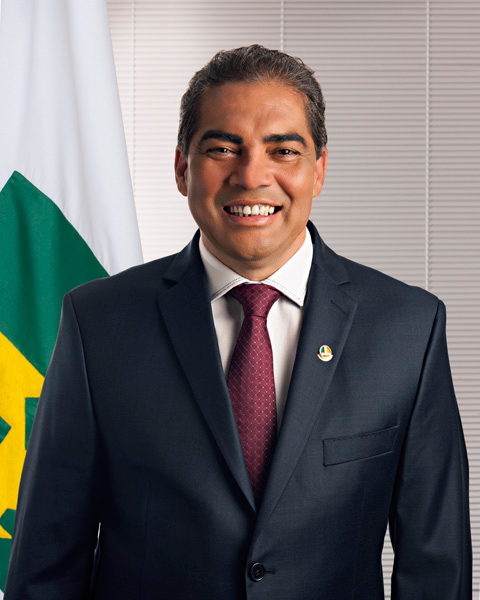

Senator from Distrito Federal
- In office February 1, 2015 – February 1, 2019

Personal details
- Born: March 9, 1960 (age 66) Corumbá de Goiás
- Party: Brazilian Democratic Movement Party
- Profession: Electrical engineer

Hélio José (born March 9, 1960) is a Brazilian politician. He has represented Distrito Federal in the Federal Senate for 55th Legislature (2015-2019). He is a member of the Brazilian Democratic Movement Party.
