= Manuela d'Ávila =

Brazilian politician and journalist

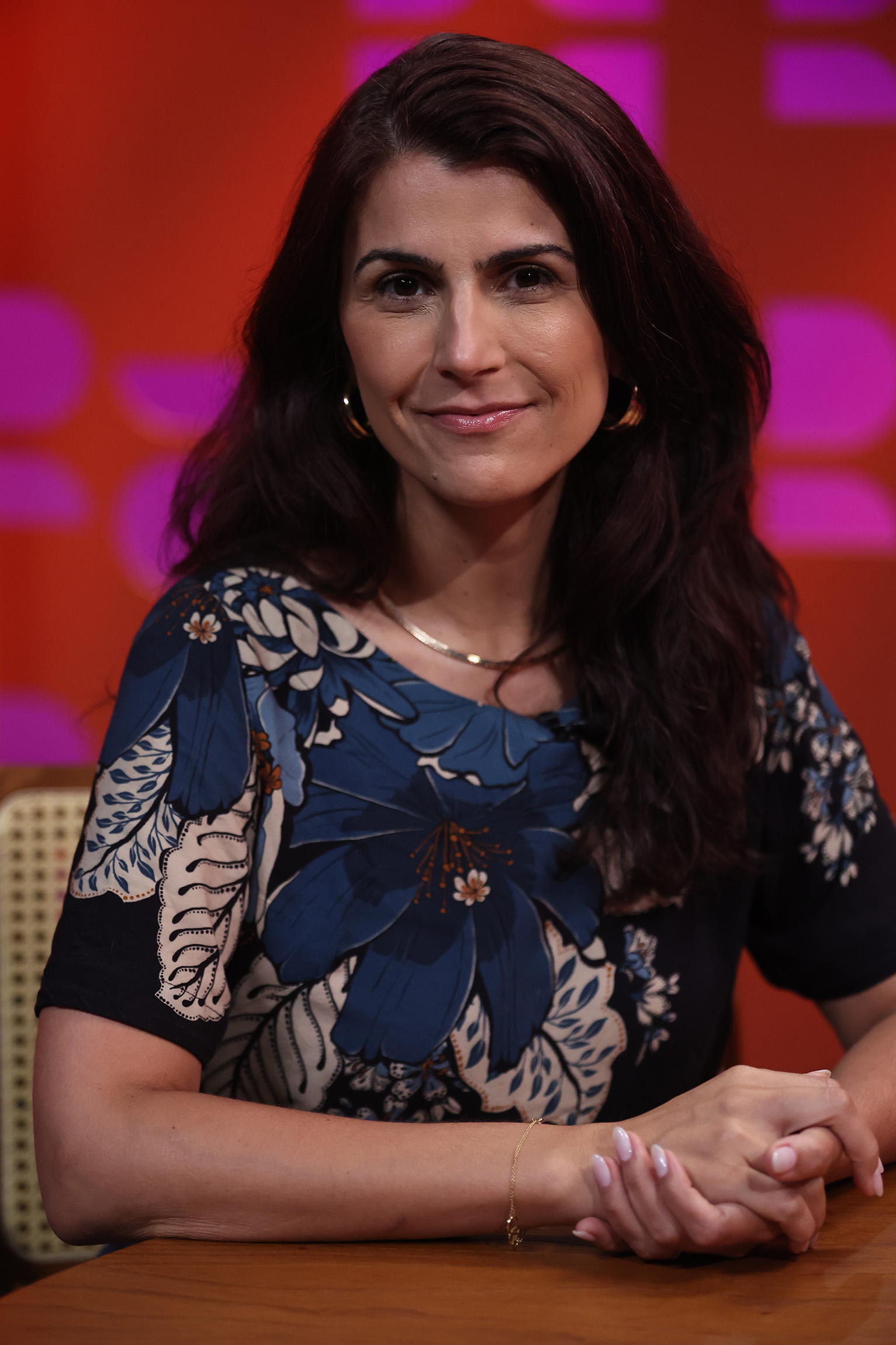
- d'Ávila in 2025

State Deputy of Rio Grande do Sul
- In office 1 February 2015 – 1 February 2019
- Constituency: At-large

Member of the Chamber of Deputies
- In office 1 February 2007 – 1 February 2015
- Constituency: Rio Grande do Sul

Councillor of Porto Alegre
- In office 1 January 2005 – 1 February 2007
- Constituency: At-large

Personal details
- Born: Manuela Pinto Vieira d'Ávila; 18 August 1981 (age 45) Porto Alegre, Rio Grande do Sul, Brazil
- Party: PSOL (since 2025)
- Other political affiliations: PCdoB (2001–2024)
- Spouse: Duca Leindecker (m. 2012)
- Children: 1
- Education: Pontifical Catholic University of Rio Grande do Sul
- Profession: Journalist, writer and politician

Manuela Pinto Vieira d'Ávila (born 18 August 1981) is a Brazilian journalist, author and politician.

As a member of the Communist Party of Brazil she served as a federal deputy for Rio Grande do Sul between 2007 and 2015, being the leader of her party in the Chamber of Deputies in 2013. She also served as a state deputy for her state between 2015 and 2019 and as a councilwoman for the state capital Porto Alegre between 2005 and 2007. In addition to this she has run for mayor of Porto Alegre three times unsuccessfully, in 2008, 2012 and 2020.

She was Fernando Haddad's vice presidential running mate in the Worker's Party presidential bid in the 2018 general election; the Haddad-d'Ávila ticket lost to Jair Bolsonaro in the second round of the presidential campaign.

In 2024 she announced her departure from the Communist Party of Brazil.

== Biography ==
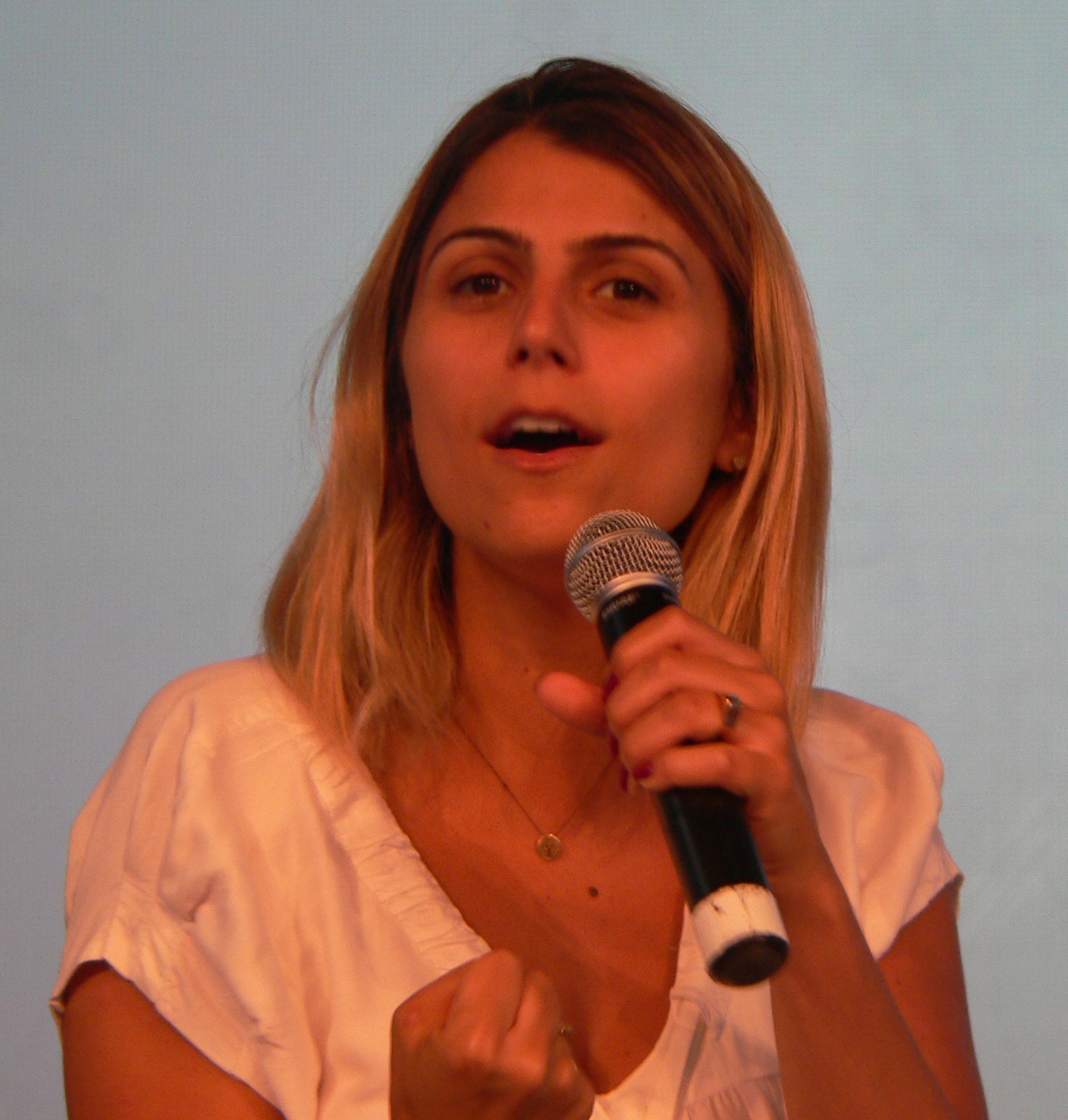
D'Ávila at 6th Campus Party, 2012

Born in Porto Alegre, D'Ávila started her political career in the student movement and eventually joined the Communist Party. She was the youngest city councilor in the history of Porto Alegre, being elected in 2004 at the age of 23. She was elected federal deputy in 2006 and was reelected in 2010. On both occasions, she was the single candidate with the most votes received in her state.

D'Ávila ran for mayor in her state's capital three times. In the first run, in 2008, she finished 3rd place. In her second run, in 2012, she placed 2nd, being defeated in the first round by José Fortunati of the Democratic Labor Party. In February 2020, d'Ávila publicly announced her intent to run for mayor of Porto Alegre for the Communist Party of Brazil in the 2020 Brazilian municipal elections. In May, the Workers' Party officially endorsed her candidacy by nominating Miguel Rossetto as her running mate. She lost in the second round to Sebastião Melo of the Brazilian Democratic Movement.

In 2014, she was elected state deputy with the highest number of votes for that office in that year.

During the Communist Party of Brazil Congress in November 2017, Manuela was launched as a pre-candidate for President of Brazil in the 2018 election. However, she later abandoned her campaign in favor of supporting the candidacy of Luiz Inácio Lula da Silva. On 11 September 2018, D'Ávila became the running mate of Fernando Haddad, who replaced Lula as candidate after he was barred from running by the Superior Electoral Court. Despite coming in second place in the first round of voting and proceeding to the second round, Haddad and d'Ávila lost the race to far-right candidate Jair Bolsonaro (PSL) and his running mate Hamilton Mourão (Brazilian Labour Renewal Party).

In 2019, she published her first book Revolução Laura: reflexões sobre maternidade e resistência. The book is a personal account of d'Ávila's own experience with maternity after the birth of Laura, her daughter. It addresses issues such as feminism and political activism in the context of motherhood and the challenges of raising a child as a politician and as a presidential candidate. Her second book Por que lutamos? was published in the same year, followed by her third book E se fosse você, published in 2020.

She declined to run for office in the 2022 Brazilian general election despite speculation that she would mount a bid for Federal Senate to represent Rio Grande do Sul.

== Personal life ==
She is married to musician Duca Leindecker. Her first daughter, Laura, was born on 27 August 2015.

Between February 2008 and January 2010, she dated then federal deputy and former Minister of Justice José Eduardo Cardozo. In June 2012, during an interview on the Brazilian late night show Agora É Tarde, she stated that the decision to admit to the relationship with the former deputy was "the bravest decision she has ever made in her life as a Congresswoman."

In the media, D'Ávila has often been referred to as the "muse of Congress" in reference to her perceived physical beauty. She finds the term offensive and in 2014, she declared: "Everyone likes to receive compliments when they are in a space [where it is acceptable] to be complimented. [...] But I wasn't running for Miss Brazil. I ran for an election and I want to be rated by my work. And men have never been distinguished [solely] by their looks and women have. It doesn't bother me individually, but it bothers me as a woman who fights for women to be respected".

After saying that religion should not be taught in public schools etc, D'Ávila was accused by some of her political opponents of being an atheist. D'Ávila is a Christian.

== Controversies ==
In a 2017 Operation Car Wash statement, former Odebrecht CEO Alexandrino Alencar accused d'Ávila of illicitly receiving R$360.000,00 (US$100,000) for her electoral campaigns. Per Alencar's statement, Odebrecht kept an entire department to coordinate the payment of bribes to politicians. In Operation Car Wash, officers seized several electronic spreadsheets linking the payments to nicknames. Every corrupt politician received a nickname based on physical characteristics, public trajectory, personal infos, owned cars/boats, origin place or generic preferences. The accusation against d'Ávila received particular interest since, according to the claim, d'Ávila's nickname was 'Avião', "aircraft" in Portuguese, which is also a Brazilian slang to call a woman "hot". Despite the claim, no further evidence was presented. She denies any wrongdoing.

== See also ==
- History of the socialist movement in Brazil
- 2018 Brazilian general election

Party political offices
New political party	Communist Party of Brazil nominee for Vice President of Brazil; 2018	Most recent
