= Guilherme Boulos =

Brazilian politician (born 1982)

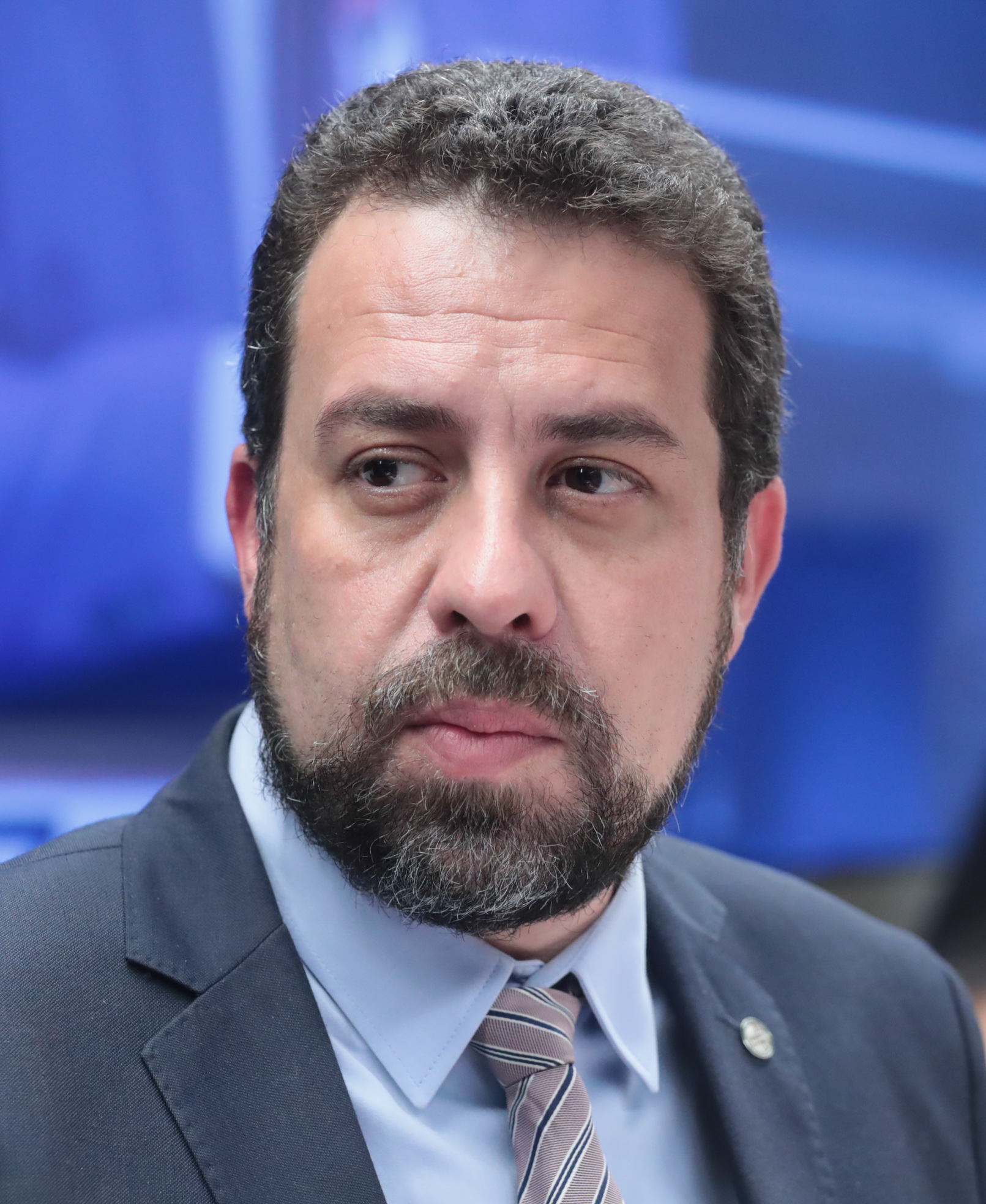
- Boulos in 2024

Secretary-General of the Presidency
- Incumbent
- Assumed office 21 October 2025
- President: Luiz Inácio Lula da Silva
- Preceded by: Márcio Macêdo

Member of the Chamber of Deputies
- Incumbent
- Assumed office 1 February 2023
- Constituency: São Paulo

Personal details
- Born: Guilherme Castro Boulos; 19 June 1982 (age 44) São Paulo, São Paulo, Brazil
- Party: PSOL (2018–present)
- Domestic partner: Natália Szermeta (2009–present)
- Children: 2
- Education: University of São Paulo (PhB) (Psy.M.)
- Occupation: Social activist, professor and writer
- Known for: Homeless Workers' Movement
- Website: guilhermeboulos.com.br

Guilherme Castro Boulos (Portuguese pronunciation: [ɡiˈʎɛɾmi ˈkastɾu ˈbowlus]; born 19 June 1982) is a Brazilian politician, activist and writer who has served as Secretary-General of the Presidency since 2025. He is a member of the National Coordination of Homeless Workers' Movement (MTST). Boulos joined the Socialism and Liberty Party (PSOL) in 2018, and was PSOL's candidate for the presidency of Brazil in the 2018 general election.

In 2020, Boulos was the PSOL nominee for mayor of São Paulo in the 2020 election, qualifying for a second round against PSDB candidate Bruno Covas. Covas defeated Boulos in the run-off. In the 2022 Brazilian general election, Boulos was elected to the Chamber of Deputies from São Paulo, having received the most votes for federal deputy in the state.

As a member of the Homeless Workers' Movement, Boulos became nationally known in 2003, when he participated in an occupation of Volkswagen's land in São Bernardo do Campo. Closely associated with President Lula da Silva, he has been described as an "heir" to Lula, with his physical likeliness to Lula during his youth being widely noted. He was selected by Time for their Time 100 Next list of emerging leaders worldwide for 2021.

== Early life and career ==
Boulos is the son of Marcos Boulos, a professor of medicine at the University of São Paulo. He is of Lebanese Christian descent, with “Boulos” meaning “Paul” in Arabic. He graduated with a degree in philosophy in 2006 and received a master's degree in mental health in 2017, both from the University of São Paulo. In his youth he engaged in the Union of Communist Youth. He also joined the Homeless Workers' Movement in 2002.

Boulos became famous in 2003 when he participated in the coordination of the invasion of a Volkswagen's ground in São Bernardo do Campo. He appeared again in the press in 2014, in the wake of the social mobilizations around the World Cup, especially the squat called Occupation People's Cup (Portuguese: Ocupação Copa do Povo), organized by the MTST in early May.

On 17 January 2017, Boulos was arrested on charges of committing judicial disobedience and incitement to violence during the repossession lawsuit of a plot of land in the district of São Mateus. Later that evening, he was released from prison. In his defense, he claims that his detention was arbitrary and for political reasons.

== Books ==
- Boulos, Guilherme (2015). De que lado você está? Reflexões sobre a conjuntura política e urbana no Brasil [Which side are you on? Reflections on the political and urban situation in Brazil] (in Portuguese). São Paulo: Boitempo. ISBN 978-85-7559-440-7.
- Boulos, Guilherme (2014). Por que ocupamos? Uma introdução à luta dos Sem-Teto [Why do we occupy? An introduction to the struggle of the homeless] (in Portuguese). São Paulo: Autonomia Literária. ISBN 9788569536017. Archived from the original on 18 February 2015.
- Boulos, Guilherme (2014). "O que quer o MTST" [What does the MTST want]. Brasil em jogo: o que fica da Copa e das Olimpíadas [Brazil in play: what remains of the World Cup and the Olympics?] (in Portuguese). São Paulo: Boitempo. ISBN 978-85-7559-384-4.

== Electoral history ==
Year	Election	Party	Office	Coalition	Partners	Party	Votes	Percent	Result
2018	Presidential election	PSOL	President	Let's Go With No Fear of Changing Brazil (PSOL, PCB)	Sônia Guajajara	PSOL	617,122	0.58%	Not elected
2020	Municipal election of São Paulo	PSOL	Mayor	To Turn the Tide (PSOL, PCB, UP)	Luiza Erundina	PSOL	1,080,736	20.24%	Runoff
2020	Municipal election of São Paulo	PSOL	Mayor	To Turn the Tide (PSOL, PCB, UP)	Luiza Erundina	PSOL	2,168,109	40.62%	Not elected
2022	State elections of São Paulo	PSOL	Federal Deputy	—N/a			1,001,472	4.22%	Elected
2024	Municipal election of São Paulo	PSOL	Mayor	Love for São Paulo (PSOL, REDE, PT, PCdoB, PV, PDT, PMB, PCB)	Marta Suplicy	PT	1,776,127	29.08%	Runoff
2024	Municipal election of São Paulo	PSOL	Mayor	Love for São Paulo (PSOL, REDE, PT, PCdoB, PV, PDT, PMB, PCB)	Marta Suplicy	PT	2,323,901	40.65%	Not elected

== See also ==
- 2018 Guilherme Boulos presidential campaign

Political offices
Preceded by Márcio Macêdo	Secretary-General of the Presidency; 2025–present	Incumbent
Party political offices
Preceded by Luciana Genro	PSOL nominee for President of Brazil; 2018	Most recent
Preceded by Luiza Erundina	PSOL nominee for Mayor of São Paulo; 2020, 2024	Most recent
