= Ciro Gomes 2018 presidential campaign =

Ciro Gomes presidential campaign, 2018
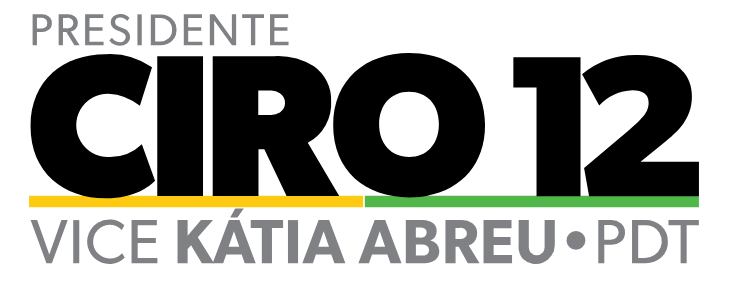
- Campaign: 2018 Brazilian general election
- Candidate: Ciro Gomes; Federal Deputy from Ceará (2007–2011); Kátia Abreu; Minister of Agriculture, Livestock and Supply (2015–2016)
- Affiliation: Democratic Labour Party; Coalition partner AVANTE
- Status: Announced: 16 September 2015; Presumptive nominee: 8 March 2018; Official nominee: 20 July 2018; Lost in the first round: 7 October 2018
- Key people: Roberto Mangabeira Unger (Economic advisor); Nelson Marconi (Economic advisor); Mauro Benevides Filho (Economic advisor)
- Slogan(s): Seu voto vale muito. Mude. (Your vote is worth a lot. Change it.)

Website
- www.cirogomes.com.br

The 2018 presidential campaign of Ciro Gomes was announced on 8 March 2018. At the Democratic Labour Party (PDT) convention on 20 July, Gomes was formally nominated as the party's presidential candidate. His running mate, Kátia Abreu, former Minister of Agriculture in Dilma Rousseff's government, was confirmed as his running mate on 5 August, on the last day of political parties conventions. Ciro Gomes' party formed the coalition Sovereign Brazil with AVANTE.

Ciro had previously been a candidate for the presidency in 1998 and 2002 as the candidate of the Popular Socialist Party (PPS), losing both times. Seen as a prospective frontrunner in 2010, Ciro ended up forgoing a bid.

Gomes finished third in the first round, receiving around 12.47% of the vote. He signaled his opposition to then-frontrunner Jair Bolsonaro for the run-off, although he did not formally endorse Bolsonaro's opponent Fernando Haddad.

== Presidential ticket ==
For the position of Vice President, Ciro chose former Minister of Agriculture and Senator from Tocantins Kátia Abreu as his running mate. Abreu was previously a member of the centrist Brazilian Democratic Movement party, but was expelled due to her opposition to the impeachment of Dilma Rousseff, thus leading to her joining the PDT. Despite her opposition to Dilma's impeachment, many on the left criticized the choice of Abreu for Vice President due to her history as an ally of agribusiness interests.

Democratic Labour Party ticket
Ciro Gomes	Kátia Abreu
for President	for Vice President
Federal Deputy from Ceará (2007–2011)	Senator for Tocantins (2007–2023)

== Campaign platform ==
In the realm of economic policy, Ciro ran in support of a financial transaction tax on large-scale financial transactions and increased state funding for education and healthcare services. On social policy, Ciro ran in support of creating a national secretariat specifically to protect LGBT rights in Brazil.

== Election result ==
=== Presidential elections ===
Election year	Candidate	Running mate	First round		Second round
Election year	Candidate	Running mate	# of overall votes	% of overall vote	Second round
2018	Ciro Gomes	Kátia Abreu	13.344.353	12.47%	Did not qualify

== Post-election analysis ==
Following Haddad's loss to Bolsonaro, some on the political left indicated that they wished that Ciro faced Bolsonaro in the second round instead of Haddad. This is because Haddad's loss was largely attributed to anti-PT sentiment following Operation Car Wash, which would not have affected Ciro. Governor Rui Costa of Bahia, a PT member, stated that the PT should have supported Ciro instead of Haddad for this reason.

Alexandre Frota, a conservative politician formerly affiliated with Bolsonaro's PSL, apologized in 2019 for past verbal assaults on Ciro, stating that in retrospect Ciro was correct about his criticisms of Bolsonaro. Ciro would later accept his apology.

== Party representation ==
- Democratic Labour Party
- Avante

== Endorsements ==
- Singer-songwriter Caetano Veloso
- Actress and ex-wife Patricia Pillar
- Singer Alcione Nazareth
- Actor Chay Suede
- Musician Tico Santa Cruz
- Musician Wesley Safadão
- Actor Marcos Veras
- Actress Mika Lins
- Governor of Ceará Camilo Santana, a member of the Workers' Party (PT)
- YouTuber PC Siqueira
- Actor Caco Ciocler
- Blogger, television presenter, and actress Titi Müller
- Actor Nicolas Prattes
- Actor Vladimir Brichta
- Actress Mariana Xavier
- Olympic swimmer Joanna Maranhão
- Actor, comedian and poet Gregório Duvivier

== See also ==
- 2018 Brazilian general election
- 2002 Brazilian general election
- 1994 Brazilian general election
