= Geraldo Alckmin 2018 presidential campaign =

Geraldo Alckmin Presidente 2018
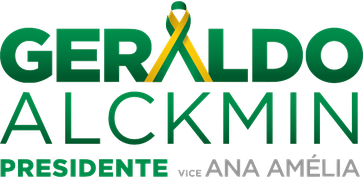
- Campaign: 2018 Brazilian general election
- Candidate: Geraldo Alckmin; Governor of São Paulo; (2001–2006; 2011–2018); Ana Amélia Lemos; Federal Senator from Rio Grande do Sul; (2011–2019)
- Affiliation: Brazilian Social Democracy Party; Coalition parties: DEM, PP, PR, PRB, SD, PTB, PSD and PPS
- Status: Announced: 9 December 2017; Presumptive nominee: 23 February 2018; Official nominee: 4 August 2018; Lost in first round: 7 October 2018
- Key people: Luiz Felipe d'Avila (communications director); Pérsio Arida (economic advisor)
- Slogan(s): O futuro melhor começa agora (The better future begins now.)

Website
- www.geraldoalckmin.com.br

The 2018 presidential campaign of Geraldo Alckmin was announced on 9 December 2017 at a national convention of the Brazilian Social Democracy Party (PSDB). Geraldo Alckmin was the 35th Governor of São Paulo from 2011 to his resignation in 2018. He had previously served as the 31st Governor, from 2001 to 2006. This is Alckmin's second bid for the presidency, his first being in 2006, when he lost to incumbent president Luiz Inácio Lula da Silva.

After Manaus mayor Arthur Virgílio Neto dropped out as pre-candidate for president on 23 February 2018, Alckmin became the PSDB's presumptive nominee for president. He was officially nominated on 4 August 2018, with Progressive Party Senator Ana Amélia as his running mate. Alckmin's campaign has secured a coalition with eight parties: DEM, PP, PR, PRB, SD, PTB, PSD and PPS

On the first round of the election on 7 October 2018, Alckmin finished fourth in the race, receiving about 4.8% of the vote. This was the worst performance for a PSDB presidential nominee in history.

== Program ==
As candidate, Alckmin has proposed a smaller government and reduction of taxes, and has defended the labor reform that took place in the administration of President Michel Temer.

== Candidates ==
Geraldo Alckmin	Ana Amélia Lemos
for President	for Vice President
Governor of São Paulo (2011–2018)	Senator for Rio Grande do Sul (2011–2019)

== Election result ==
=== Presidential elections ===
Election year	Candidate	First round		Second round
Election year	Candidate	# of overall votes	% of overall vote	Second round
2018	Geraldo Alckmin	5.096.341	4.76%	Did not qualify
