= Dayany Bittencourt =

Brazilian politician (born 1981)

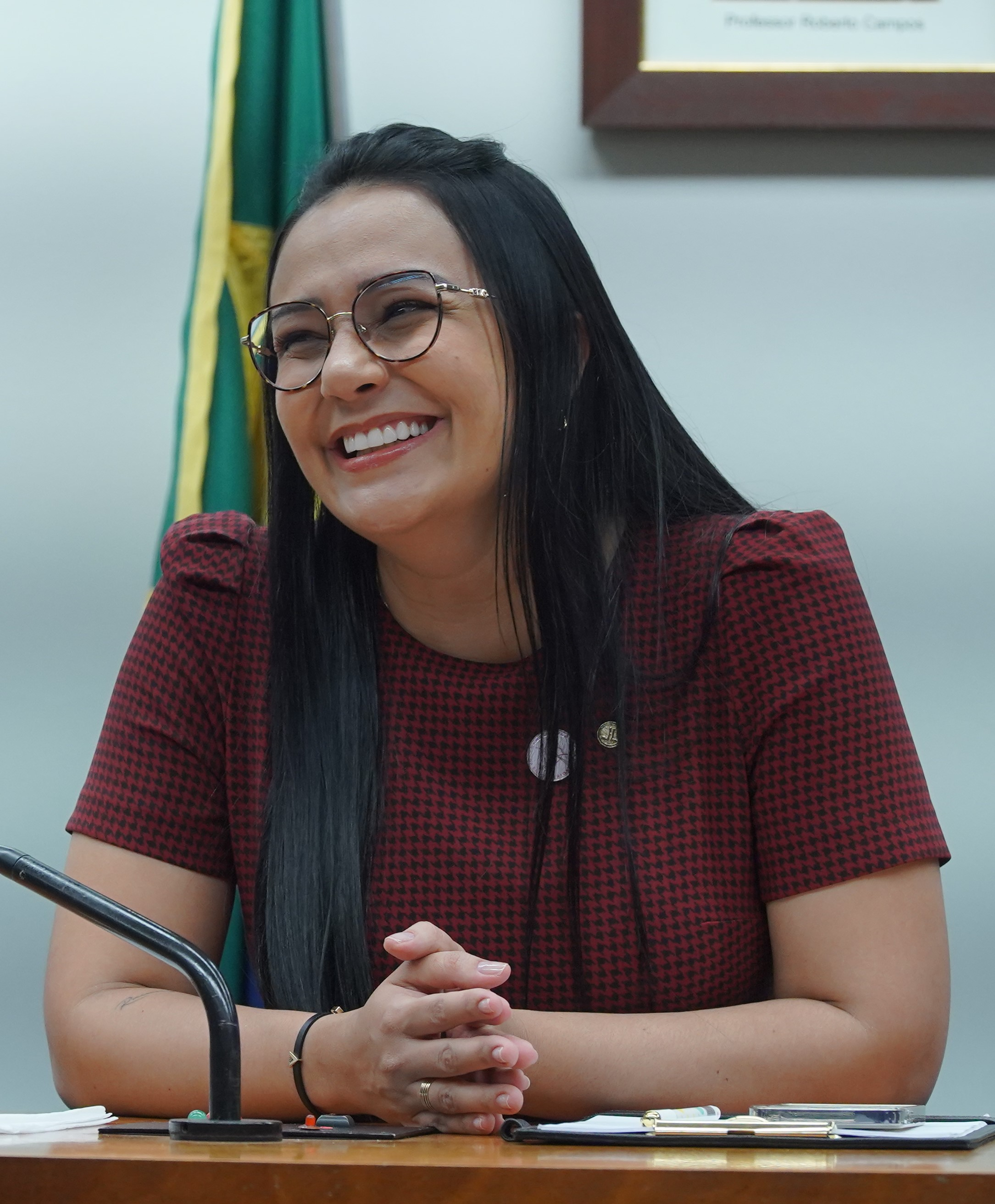
- Bittencourt in 2023

Member of the Chamber of Deputies
- Incumbent
- Assumed office 1 February 2023
- Constituency: Ceará

Personal details
- Born: 13 September 1981 (age 45)
- Party: Brazil Union (since 2022)
- Spouse: Capitão Wagner

Dayany Bittencourt Santil (born 13 September 1981) is a Brazilian politician serving as a member of the Chamber of Deputies since 2023. She is married to Capitão Wagner.
