= 2021 President of the Chamber of Deputies of Brazil election =

- 1 February 2021

Needed to Win: Majority of the votes cast 505 votes cast, 253 needed for a majority
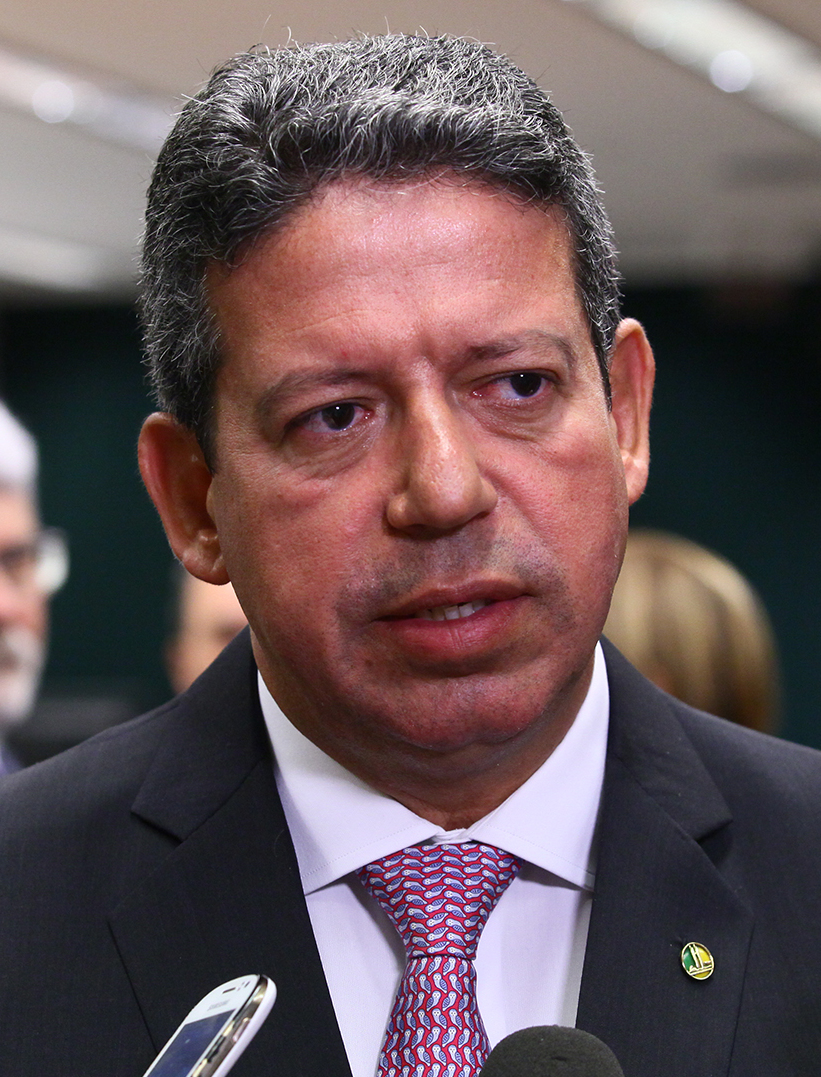

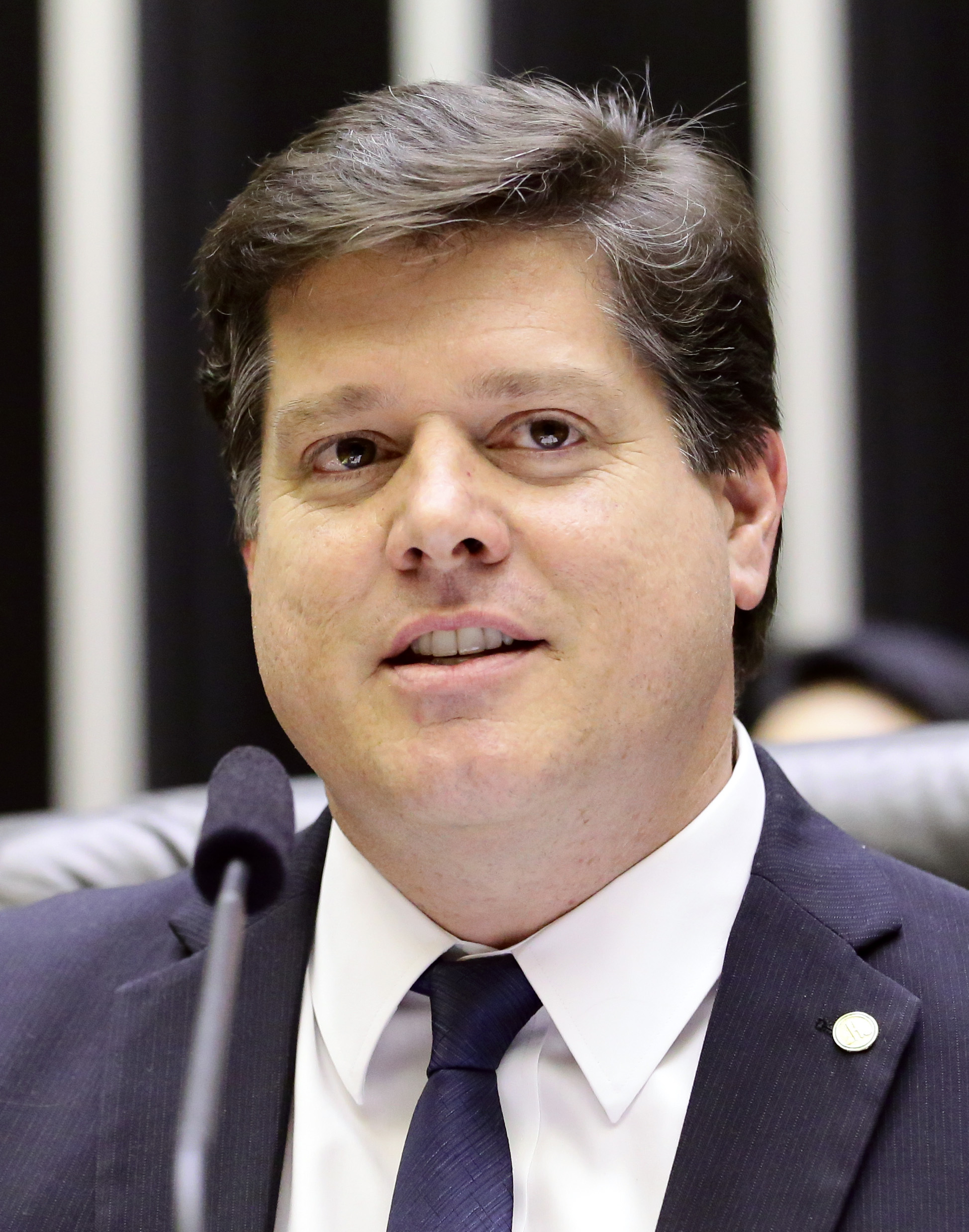
	Majority party	Minority party
Candidate	Arthur Lira	Baleia Rossi
Party	PP	MDB
Leader's seat	Alagoas	São Paulo
Members' vote	302	145
President before election
Rodrigo Maia
DEM
Elected President
Arthur Lira
PP

The 2021 President of the Chamber of Deputies of Brazil election took place on 1 February 2021, the day after the opening day of the 3rd Session of the 56th Legislature of the National Congress.

Incumbent President Rodrigo Maia can't run for re-election due to term limits.

Deputy Arthur Lira (PP-AL) won Baleia Rossi (MDB-SP) with 302 votes over 145 votes on Rossi and 56 other votes.

== Candidates ==
=== Confirmed candidates ===
- André Janones (AVANTE-MG) Federal Deputy from Minas Gerais since 2019.
- Arthur Lira (PP-AL) - Federal Deputy from Alagoas since 2011; State Deputy of Alagoas 1999–2011; City Councillor of Maceió 1993–1999.
- Baleia Rossi (MDB-SP) - Federal Deputy from São Paulo since 2015; National President of the Brazilian Democratic Movement since 2019.
- Fábio Ramalho (MDB-MG) - Federal Deputy from Minas Gerais since 2011; First Vice President of the Chamber of Deputies 2017–2019; Mayor of Malacacheta 1997–2005; candidate for President of the Chamber in 2016 and 2019.
- Kim Kataguiri (DEM-SP) - Federal Deputy from São Paulo since 2019.
- Luiza Erundina (PSOL-SP) - Federal Deputy since 1999; Minister of the Federal Administration 1993; Mayor of São Paulo 1989–93; State Deputy of São Paulo 1987–89; City Councillor of São Paulo 1983–87; candidate for President of the Chamber in 2016 and 2017; candidate for Mayor of São Paulo in 1996, 2000, 2004 and 2016.
- Marcel van Hattem (NOVO-RS) - Federal Deputy from Rio Grande do Sul since 2019; State Deputy of Rio Grande do Sul 2015–18; City Councillor of Dois Irmãos 2005–09; candidate for President of the Chamber in 2019.
- Roberto Peternelli (PSL-SP) - Federal Deputy from São Paulo since 2019; candidate for President of the Chamber in 2019.

=== Withdrawn candidates ===
- Alessandro Molon (PSB-RJ) - Federal Deputy from Rio de Janeiro since 2011; Chamber PSB Leader since 2020; Chamber Opposition Leader 2019–2020; State Deputy of Rio de Janeiro 2003–2011.
- Alexandre Frota (PSDB-SP) - Federal Deputy from São Paulo since 2019.
- Aguinaldo Ribeiro (PP-PB) - Federal Deputy from Paraíba since 2011; Minister of Cities 2012–2014; State Deputy of Paraíba 2003–2011.
- Carlos Zarattini (PT-SP) - Federal Deputy from São Paulo since 2007; State Deputy of São Paulo 1999–2003; City Councillor of São Paulo 1995–96, 2001–02.
- Augusto Rosa (PL-SP) - Federal Deputy from São Paulo since 2015.
- Elmar Nascimento (DEM-BA) - Federal Deputy from 2015; State Deputy of Bahia 2003–15.
- Fábio Faria (PSD-RN) - Minister of Communications since 2020; Federal Deputy from Rio Grande do Norte since 2007.
- Fernando Coelho Filho (DEM-PE) - Federal Deputy from Pernambuco since 2007; Minister of Mines and Energy 2016–18.
- Gleisi Hoffmann (PT-PR) - Federal Deputy from Paraná since 2019; National Chair of the Workers' Party since 2017; Senator for Paraná 2011–19; Chief of Staff of the Presidency 2011–14; Chief Financial Office of Itaipu Binacional 2003–06; Municipal Secretary of Public Management of Londrina 2001–03; State Secretary of Administrative Restructuring 1999–2000
- Luciano Bivar (PSL-PE) - Federal Deputy from Pernambuco since 2019, 2017–18, 1993–2003; 2nd Vice President of the Chamber of Deputies since 2019; National Chair of the Social Liberal Party since 2018; 1998–2018.
- Marcelo Freixo (PSOL-RJ) - Federal Deputy from Rio de Janeiro since 2019; State Deputy of Rio de Janeiro 2007–19; candidate for President of the Chamber in 2019.
- Marcelo Ramos (PL-AM) - Federal Deputy from Amazonas since 2019; State Deputy of Amazonas 2011–2015; City Councillor of Manaus 2007–2011.
- Marcos Pereira (REP-SP) - Federal Deputy from São Paulo since 2019; First Vice President of the Chamber of Deputies since 2019; Minister of Industry, Foreign Trade and Services 2016–2018.
- Soraya Santos (PL-RJ) - Federal Deputy from Rio de Janeiro since 2015.
- Tereza Cristina (DEM-MS) - Minister of Agriculture, Livestock and Supply since 2019; Federal Deputy from Mato Grosso do Sul since 2015; State Secretary of Agrarian Development, Production, Industry, Trade and Tourism of Mato Grosso do Sul 2007–14.

=== Endorsements ===
Arthur Lira (PP-AL)

Brazil Presidents

- Jair Bolsonaro, 38th President of Brazil (2019–2023)

Chamber of Deputies

- Dep. Marcelo Ramos (PL-AM)
- Dep. Fred Costa (PATRI-MG)
- Dep. André Ferreira (PSC-PE)
- Dep. Eros Biondini (PROS-MG)
- Dep. Marcos Pereira (REP-SP)
- Former Dep. Roberto Jefferson (PTB-RJ)

Political parties

- Social Liberal Party (PSL)
- Progressistas (PP)
- Liberal Party (PL)
- Social Democratic Party (PSD)
- Podemos (PODE)
- Avante
- Brazilian Labour Party (PTB)
- Social Christian Party (PSC)
- Patriota
- Republican Party of the Social Order (PROS)
- Republicanos
Baleia Rossi (MDB-SP)

Chamber of Deputies

- Dep. Rodrigo Maia (DEM-RJ), President of the Chamber (2016–2021)
- Dep. David Miranda (PSOL-RJ)
- Dep. Fernanda Melchionna (PSOL-RS)
- Dep. Marcelo Freixo (PSOL-RJ)
- Dep. Sâmia Bomfim (PSOL-SP)
- Dep. Vivi Reis (PSOL-PA)

Political parties

- Workers' Party (PT)
- Brazilian Democratic Movement (MDB)
- Brazilian Socialist Party (PSB)
- Democratic Labour Party (PDT)
- Solidariedade
- Communist Party of Brazil (PCdoB)
- Cidadania
- Green Party (PV)
- Sustainability Network (REDE)
Luiza Erundina (PSOL-SP)

Chamber of Deputies

- Dep. Áurea Carolina (PSOL-MG)
- Dep. Glauber Braga (PSOL-RJ)
- Dep. Ivan Valente (PSOL-SP)
- Dep. Talíria Petrone (PSOL-RJ)

== Predictions ==
Estadão prediction
Lira: 237	Others/No ans./Not found: 143	Rossi: 133
▲

O Globo prediction
Lira: 253	Oth.: 81	Rossi: 179
▲

Pollster	Lira PP	Rossi MDB	Others	No ans./ Not found	Lead
Estadão	237	133	22	121	104
O Globo	253	179	18	63	74

== Formal voting ==
=== President ===
Candidate	Party	Votes	%
Arthur Lira (AL) ✓	PP	302	60.04
Baleia Rossi (SP)	MDB	145	28.83
Fábio Ramalho (MG)	MDB	21	4.17
Luiza Erundina (SP)	PSOL	16	3.18
Marcel van Hattem (RS)	NOVO	13	2.58
André Janones (MG)	Avante	3	0.60
Kim Kataguiri (SP)	DEM	2	0.40
Roberto Peternelli (SP)	PSL	1	0.20
Total		503	100.00
Valid votes		503	99.60
Invalid/blank votes		2	0.40
Total votes		505	100.00
Registered voters/turnout		513	98.44

=== First Vice President ===
Candidate	Party	Votes	%
Marcelo Ramos (AM) ✓	PL	398	100.00
Total		398	100.00
Valid votes		398	87.86
Invalid/blank votes		55	12.14
Total votes		453	100.00
Registered voters/turnout		513	88.30

=== Second Vice President ===
Candidate	Party	Votes	%
André de Paula (PE) ✓	PSD	270	62.21
Júlio César (PI)	PSD	121	27.88
Éder Mauro (PA)	PSD	43	9.91
Total		434	100.00
Valid votes		434	96.23
Invalid/blank votes		17	3.77
Total votes		451	100.00
Registered voters/turnout		513	87.91

=== First Secretary ===
Candidate	Party	Votes	%
Luciano Bivar (PE) ✓	PSL	298	71.63
Léo Motta	PSL	118	28.37
Total		416	100.00
Valid votes		416	92.24
Invalid/blank votes		35	7.76
Total votes		451	100.00
Registered voters/turnout		513	87.91

=== Second Secretary ===
Candidate	Party	First round		Second round	
Candidate	Party	Votes	%	Votes	%
Marília Arraes (PE) ✓	PT	172	43.88	192	53.33
João Daniel (SC)	PT	166	42.35	168	46.67
Paulo Guedes (MG)	PT	54	13.78		
Total		392	100.00	360	100.00
Valid votes		392	86.92	360	93.51
Invalid/blank votes		59	13.08	25	6.49
Total votes		451	100.00	385	100.00
Registered voters/turnout		513	87.91	513	75.05

=== Third Secretary ===
Candidate	Party	Votes	%
Rose Modesto (MS) ✓	PSDB	398	100.00
Total		398	100.00
Valid votes		398	88.25
Invalid/blank votes		53	11.75
Total votes		451	100.00
Registered voters/turnout		513	87.91

=== Fourth Secretary ===
Candidate	Party	Votes	%
Rosângela Gomes (RJ) ✓	Republicanos	418	100.00
Total		418	100.00
Valid votes		418	92.68
Invalid/blank votes		33	7.32
Total votes		451	100.00
Registered voters/turnout		513	87.91
