= 2023 President of the Chamber of Deputies of Brazil election =

- 1 February 2023

Needed to win: Majority of the votes cast 504 votes cast, 253 needed for a majority
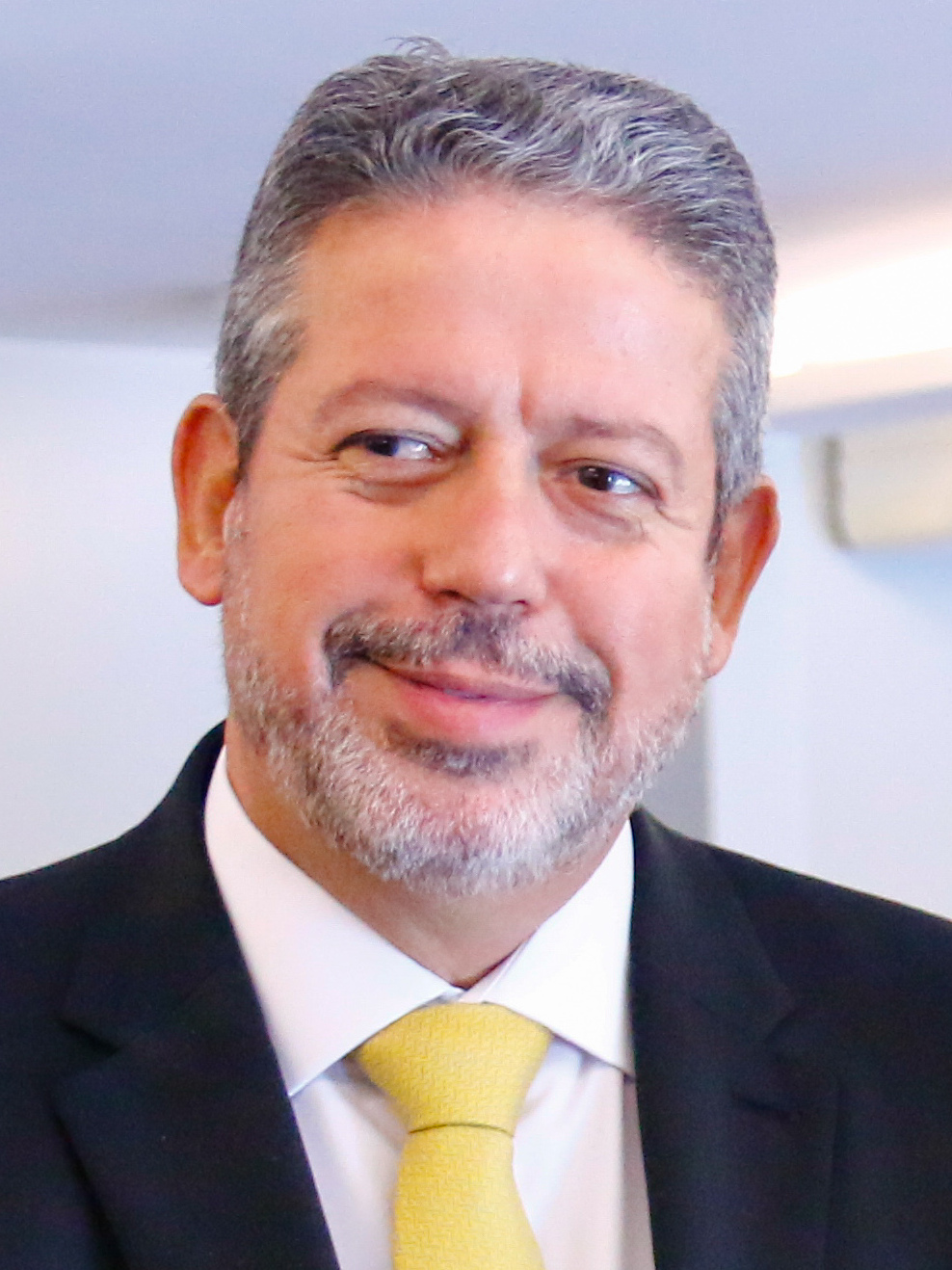

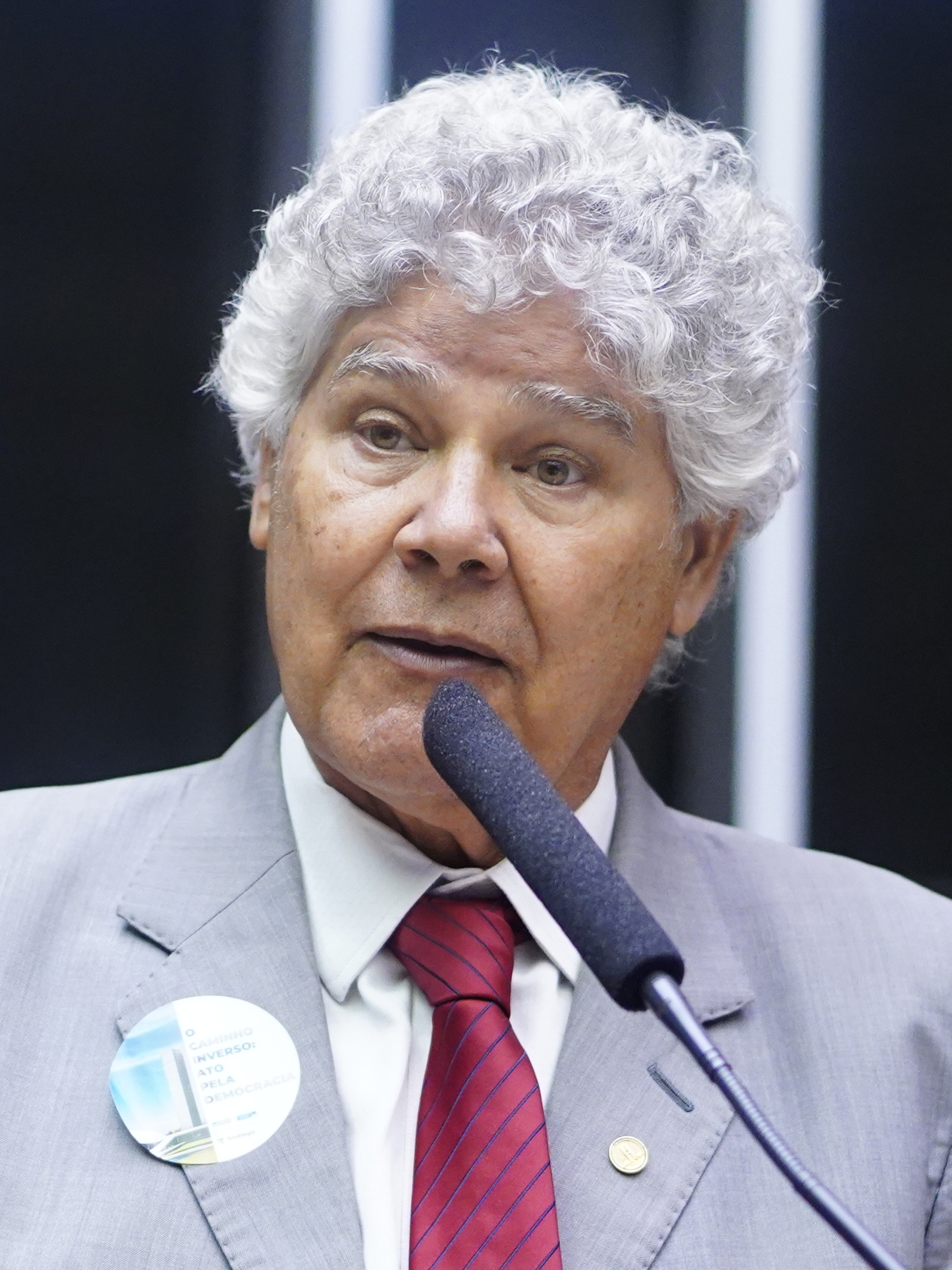

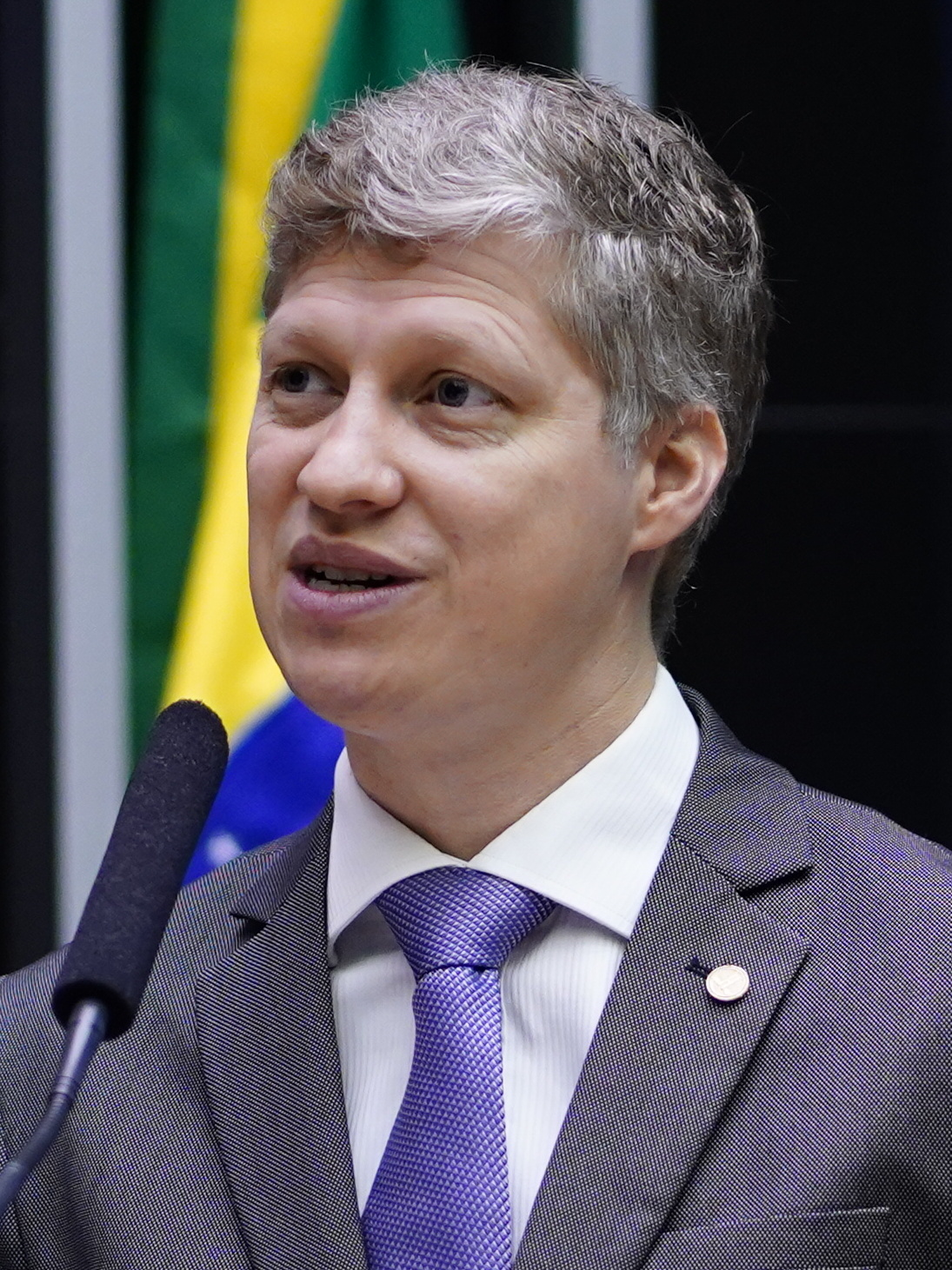
	Majority party	Minority party	Third party
Candidate	Arthur Lira	Chico Alencar	Marcel van Hattem
Party	PP	PSOL	NOVO
Leader's seat	Alagoas	Rio de Janeiro	Rio Grande do Sul
Members' vote	464	21	19
- Arthur Lira Chico Alencar Marcel van Hattem Abstentions and blank votes
President before election
Arthur Lira
PP
Elected President
Arthur Lira
PP

The 2023 President of the Chamber of Deputies of Brazil election took place on 1 February 2023, the day after the opening day of the 1st Session of the 57th Legislature of the National Congress, almost four months after the 2022 elections. It resulted in the election of the President of the Chamber of Deputies, two vice presidents, the positions of 1st, 2nd, 3rd and 4th Secretaries and their respective replacements. They will hold a biennial term (2023-2025), making it impossible for them to be re-elected in the same Legislature - as established in Art. 5 of the Internal Regulations of the Chamber of Deputies.

The incumbent president, Arthur Lira was able to run for a second term and was re-elected. The election was carried out by secret ballot and electronic voting, requiring an absolute majority of votes, in the first ballot, and a simple majority, in the second ballot, with the absolute majority of the Deputies present. (Art. 7 of the Internal Regulations of the Chamber of Deputies)

== Candidates ==
=== Confirmed candidates ===
- Arthur Lira (PP-AL) - President of the Chamber of Deputies since 2021; Federal deputy for Alagoas since 2011; State deputy for Alagoas 1999−2011 and Councillor of Maceió 1993−99. Lira was elected president of the Chamber of Deputies in 2021 and will run for re-election in February 2023 for another two years in office. The federal deputy from Alagoas was elected to command the Chamber of Deputies with 302 votes in the last election. He was supported, at the time, by a coalition formed by 11 parties (PSL, PP, PSD, PL, Republicanos, PODE, PTB, PATRI, PSC, PROS and Avante) and took office shortly after the result was announced. In the last internal election, Lira faced candidates with a strong campaign, such as the national president of the Brazilian Democratic Movement (MDB), Baleia Rossi, a federal deputy for São Paulo. At the time, the deputy from Alagoas used the slogan “For the entire Chamber to have a voice”.
- Chico Alencar (PSOL-RJ) - Councillor of Rio de Janeiro 1989−97 and 2021−23; Federal deputy for Rio de Janeiro 2003−19; and since 2023. State deputy for Rio de Janeiro 1999−2003. Alencar was a federal deputy for the state of Rio de Janeiro for four consecutive terms (from 2013 to 2019) and councilor of the city of Rio de Janeiro between January 2021 and February 2023, when he assumed his fifth term as a federal deputy. He was re-elected federal deputy in the 2022 general elections with 115,023 votes. His candidacy was announced by the Socialism and Liberty Party on January 21, 2023. On social media, Alencar stated that his purpose was to “mark a position” against the current president of the Chamber of Deputies.
- Marcel van Hattem (NOVO-RS) - Councillor of Dois Irmãos 2005–09; State deputy for Rio Grande do Sul 2015-19 and Federal deputy for Rio Grande do Sul since 2019. His candidacy was announced on the eve of the election for the presidency of the Chamber of Deputies, on January 31, 2023. Van Hattem said that his candidacy is in opposition to Lula's government and the Workers' Party (PT), but independent of ties with the former President of Brazil, Jair Bolsonaro (PL). The candidate defended the resumption of anti-corruption agendas, such as the end of the parliamentary privilege, and said it was necessary to advance in economic reforms. He also said that the Chamber of Deputies needs to recover its protagonism side by side with the Judiciary and the Executive. He also said he was “concerned” with actions linked to alleged physiology in the Chamber. His candidacy was supported by his own part and some member of Podemos (PODE), like the former prosecutor of the Operation Car Wash, Deltan Dallagnol.

== Formal voting ==
=== President ===
Candidate	Party	Votes	%
Arthur Lira (AL) ✓	PP	464	92.06
Chico Alencar (RJ)	PSOL	21	4.17
Marcel van Hattem (RS)	NOVO	19	3.77
Total		504	100.00
Valid votes		504	99.02
Invalid/blank votes		5	0.98
Total votes		509	100.00
Registered voters/turnout		513	99.22

=== First Vice President ===
Candidate	Party	Votes	%
Marcos Pereira (SP) ✓	Republicanos	458	100.00
Total		458	100.00
Valid votes		458	89.98
Invalid/blank votes		51	10.02
Total votes		509	100.00
Registered voters/turnout		513	99.22

=== Second Vice President ===
Candidate	Party	Votes	%
Sóstenes Cavalcante (RJ) ✓	PL	385	80.38
Luciano Vieira (RJ)	PL	94	19.62
Total		479	100.00
Valid votes		479	94.11
Invalid/blank votes		30	5.89
Total votes		509	100.00
Registered voters/turnout		509	100.00

=== First Secretary ===
Candidate	Party	Votes	%
Luciano Bivar (PE) ✓	UNIÃO	411	100.00
Total		411	100.00
Valid votes		411	80.75
Invalid/blank votes		98	19.25
Total votes		509	100.00
Registered voters/turnout		509	100.00

=== Second Secretary ===
Candidate	Party	Votes	%
Maria do Rosário (RS) ✓	PT	371	100.00
Total		371	100.00
Valid votes		371	72.89
Invalid/blank votes		138	27.11
Total votes		509	100.00
Registered voters/turnout		509	100.00

=== Third Secretary ===
Candidate	Party	Votes	%
Júlio César (PI) ✓	PSD	467	100.00
Total		467	100.00
Valid votes		467	91.75
Invalid/blank votes		42	8.25
Total votes		509	100.00
Registered voters/turnout		509	100.00

=== Fourth Secretary ===
Candidate	Party	Votes	%
Lucio Mosquini (RO) ✓	MDB	447	100.00
Total		447	100.00
Valid votes		447	87.82
Invalid/blank votes		62	12.18
Total votes		509	100.00
Registered voters/turnout		509	100.00

=== Substitute Secretaries ===
For this election, a block voting system is used, as all of the members of the Chamber vote in 4 candidates at the same time.

Candidate	Party	Votes	%
Gilberto Nascimento (SP) ✓	PSC	420	26.43
Pompeo de Mattos (RS) ✓	PDT	398	25.05
Beto Pereira (MS) ✓	PSDB	389	24.48
André Ferreira (PE) ✓	PL	382	24.04
Total		1,589	100.00
Valid votes		1,589	78.05
Invalid/blank votes		447	21.95
Total votes		2,036	100.00
