= 2019 President of the Chamber of Deputies of Brazil election =

- 1 February 2019

Needed to Win: Majority of the votes cast 512 votes cast, 257 needed for a majority
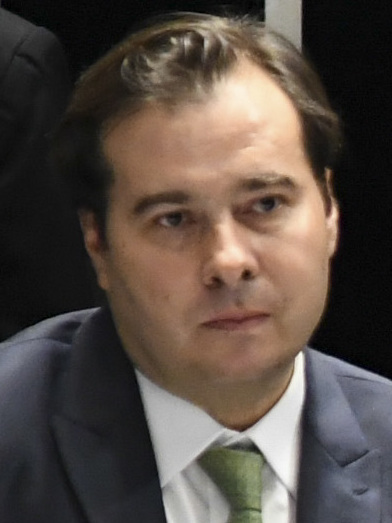

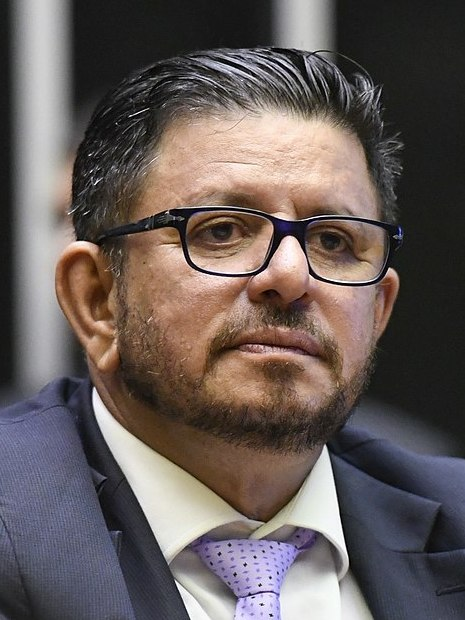

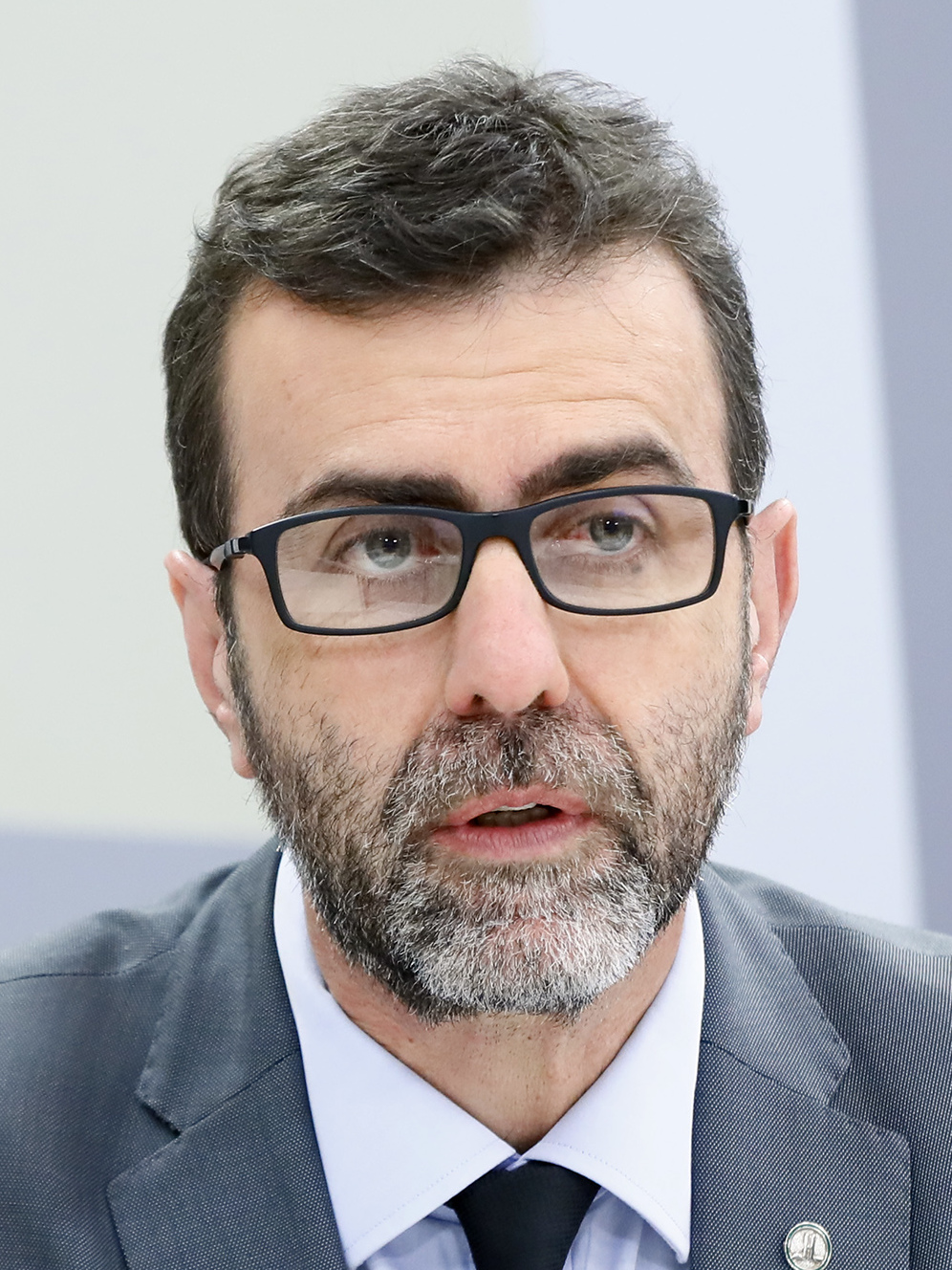

	Majority party	Minority party	Third party
Candidate	Rodrigo Maia	Fábio Ramalho	Marcelo Freixo
Party	DEM	MDB	PSOL
Leader's seat	Rio de Janeiro	Minas Gerais	Rio de Janeiro
Members' vote	334	66	50
Candidate	Others
Members' vote	59
President before election
Rodrigo Maia
DEM
Elected President
Rodrigo Maia
DEM

The 2019 President of the Chamber of Deputies of Brazil election took place on 1 February 2019, following the opening of the 1st session of the 56th Legislature of the National Congress, almost four months after the 2018 elections.

The Dean of the Chamber of Deputies, in this case, Luiz Gonzaga Patriota (PSB–PE), administered the session of election for President. Rodrigo Maia (DEM–RJ) presided the session of oath of office of the members of the Chamber.

Incumbent President, Maia received 334, almost two thirds of the Chamber, to become its President. Chamber's 1st Vice President Fábio Ramalho (MDB–MG) garnered 66 votes, with 112 more going to other candidates (50 to Marcelo Freixo, 30 to João Henrique Caldas, 23 to Marcel van Hattem, 4 to Ricardo Barros, 2 to Roberto Peternelli, and 3 blank votes). As 512 deputies cast a vote, 257 votes were necessary in order to win.

== Candidates ==
=== Confirmed candidates ===
- Rodrigo Maia (DEM) - President of the Chamber of Deputies since 2016; Federal Deputy from Rio de Janeiro since 1999.
- Fábio Ramalho (MDB) - 1st Vice President of the Chamber of Deputies since 2017; Federal Deputy from Minas Gerais since 2007; Mayor of Malacacheta 1997–2004.
- João Henrique Caldas (PSB) - 3rd Secretary of the Chamber of Deputies since 2017; Federal Deputy from Alagoas since 2011.
- Marcelo Freixo (PSOL) - Federal Deputy from Rio de Janeiro taking office in 2019; State Deputy for Rio de Janeiro since 2007.
- Roberto Peternelli (PSL) - Brazilian Army Divisional General. Federal Deputy from São Paulo taking office in 2019.
- Ricardo Barros (PP) - Federal Deputy from Paraná since 2015, 1995–2011; Minister of Health 2016–2018; Mayor of Maringá 1989–1993.
- Marcel van Hattem (NOVO) - Federal Deputy from Rio Grande do Sul taking office in 2019; State Deputy for Rio Grande do Sul 2015–2018; City Councillor of Dois Irmãos 2005–2009.

=== Withdrawn candidates ===
- Alceu Moreira (MDB) - Federal Deputy from Rio Grande do Sul since 2014.
- Kim Kataguiri (DEM) - Federal Deputy from São Paulo taking office in 2019. Leader of the Free Brazil Movement.
- Arthur Lira (PP) - Federal Deputy from Alagoas since 2011; State Deputy for Alagoas 1999–2011; City Councillor of Maceió 1993–1999.

== Formal voting ==
=== President ===
Candidate	Party	Votes	%
Rodrigo Maia (RJ) ✓	DEM	334	65.62
Fábio Ramalho (MG)	MDB	66	12.97
Marcelo Freixo (RJ)	PSOL	50	9.82
João Henrique Caldas (AL)	PSB	30	5.89
Marcel van Hattem (RS)	NOVO	23	4.52
Ricardo Barros (PR)	PP	4	0.79
Roberto Peternelli (SP)	PSL	2	0.39
Total		509	100.00
Valid votes		509	99.41
Invalid/blank votes		3	0.59
Total votes		512	100.00
Registered voters/turnout		513	99.81

=== First Vice President ===
Candidate	Party	Votes	%
Marcos Pereira (SP) ✓	PRB	398	100.00
Total		398	100.00
Valid votes		398	77.73
Invalid/blank votes		114	22.27
Total votes		512	100.00
Registered voters/turnout		513	99.81

=== Second Vice President ===
Candidate	Party	First round		Second round	
Candidate	Party	Votes	%	Votes	%
Luciano Bivar (PE) ✓	PSL	240	59.85	198	51.83
Charles Evangelista (MG)	PSL	161	40.15	184	48.17
Total		401	100.00	382	100.00
Valid votes		401	78.32	382	89.88
Invalid/blank votes		111	21.68	43	10.12
Total votes		512	100.00	425	100.00
Registered voters/turnout		513	99.81	513	82.85

=== First Secretary ===
Candidate	Party	Votes	%
Soraya Santos (RJ) ✓	PR	315	63.25
Fernando Giacobo (PR)	PR	183	36.75
Total		498	100.00
Valid votes		498	97.27
Invalid/blank votes		14	2.73
Total votes		512	100.00
Registered voters/turnout		513	99.81

=== Second Secretary ===
Candidate	Party	Votes	%
Mário Heringer (MG) ✓	PDT	408	100.00
Total		408	100.00
Valid votes		408	79.69
Invalid/blank votes		104	20.31
Total votes		512	100.00
Registered voters/turnout		513	99.81

=== Third Secretary ===
Candidate	Party	Votes	%
Fábio Faria (RN) ✓	PSD	416	100.00
Total		416	100.00
Valid votes		416	81.25
Invalid/blank votes		96	18.75
Total votes		512	100.00
Registered voters/turnout		513	99.81

=== Fourth Secretary ===
Candidate	Party	Votes	%
André Fufuca (MA) ✓	PP	408	100.00
Total		408	100.00
Valid votes		408	79.69
Invalid/blank votes		104	20.31
Total votes		512	100.00
Registered voters/turnout		513	99.81
