= Augusto Rosa =

Brazilian politician

Capitão Augusto
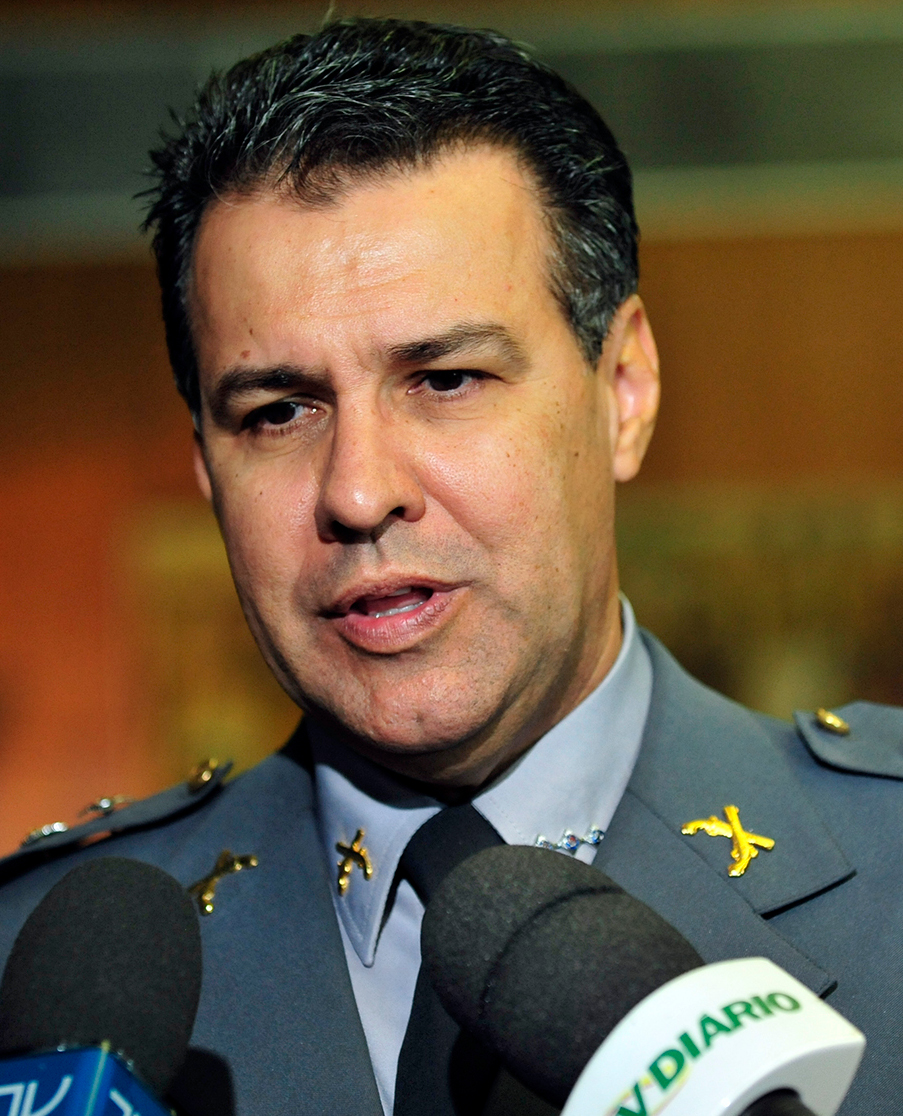

Member of the Chamber of Deputies
- Incumbent
- Assumed office 1 February 2015
- Constituency: São Paulo

Personal details
- Born: José Augusto Rosa; 4 October 1966 (age 60) Ourinhos, São Paulo, Brazil
- Party: PL (2014–present)
- Profession: Military police officer

Military service
- Allegiance: Brazil
- Branch/service: Military Police of São Paulo State
- Years of service: 1988–present
- Rank: Captain
- Unit: 8th Fire Department Fire Grouping; 2nd Battalion of the Military Highway Police
- Commands: 1st Company of 31st Battalion of the Military Police

José Augusto Rosa (born 4 October 1966 in Ourinhos), commonly known as Captain Augusto (Portuguese: Capitão Augusto), is a Brazilian military police officer and politician, member of the Liberal Party (PL).

== History ==
During the 2014 state elections, Rosa was elected Federal Deputy for São Paulo, garnering 46,905 votes (representing 0.22% of the valid votes). In that election, he was benefited by the voted garnered by Federal Deputy Tiririca, from his same party.

Rosa is founder of the Brazilian Military Party, which couldn't get enough signatures to be registered before the 2014 elections.

He voted to impeach President Dilma Rousseff and in favor of the Constitutional Amendment to limit public expenses (PEC 241) in 2016. In 2017, he was favorable to the Labour Reform (PL 6787/2016) and the two complaints of the Federal Public Prosecutor's Office (MPF) against President Michel Temer in August and in October.

Augusto got 242,327 votes (1.15% of the valid votes) in the 2018 state elections and was re-elected Federal Deputy. He was the 3rd most voted candidate of the Liberal Party (then Party of the Republic) and the 10th most voted of the state.

In January 2021, Augusto launched his candidacy for President of the Chamber of Deputies in the 2021 election, despite his party's support to candidate Arthur Lira (PP-AL).
