= Matheus Bazzo =

Brazilian film director, producer and entrepreneur

- Born: 29 October 1990 (age 35); Passo Fundo, Rio Grande do Sul, Brazil
- Occupations: Designer, producer, photographer, art director and entrepreneur
- Years active: 2011–present
- Notable work: O Jardim das Aflições

Matheus Bazzo Malgarise (born 29 October 1990 in Passo Fundo) is a Brazilian designer, photographer, producer, art director and entrepreneur. Bazzo is the producer of the movie O Jardim das Aflições 'The Garden of Afflictions', which depicts the work, thoughts and daily life of Brazilian philosopher and writer Olavo de Carvalho (1947–2022). He is also the founder of Lumine, a Catholic streaming platform, as well as of Minha Biblioteca Católica (My Catholic Library), a religious book subscription club.

== Career ==
Born in the city of Passo Fundo, in the state of Rio Grande do Sul, Bazzo resided only for a short time in his own native city and moved to São Leopoldo with his family, to the region of Vale dos Sinos. At 16 he started experimenting with analog photography, having launched a zine called Câmera Diynamite, which published pictures shot by artists from around the world. In the aftermath, he began his undergraduate studies in Visual Arts at Federal University of Rio Grande do Sul. At the time he worked as a photographer and also as a designer, acting in companies of the sector and collaborating with press vehicles such as Vice.

In the year of 2011 Bazzo was introduced to the work of Olavo de Carvalho, and from the philosopher's ideas he conceptualized the movie O Jardim das Aflições, in order to present the life and daily routine of that Brazilian thinker. Matheus Bazzo later joined with director Josias Teófilo, who had a similar project in mind. The partnership began when they jointly started developing this project.

Between 2015 and 2016, Matheus Bazzo and Josias Teófilo fundraised for the documentary in what was the biggest crowdfunding in Brazil's history, a fundraising valued at R$ 350.000,00 among 2.800 individual investors. The shooting took place in the year of 2015, in the United States, in Richmond, Virginia. The film premiere was held on 31 May 2017, and had a great repercussion in mainstream media primarily due to differences between Olavo's supporters and opponents. That same year, O Jardim das Aflições won the award for best picture and film editing in the 21st Cine-PE Festival.

During 2017, Bazzo undertakes a personal project, Minha Biblioteca Católica (MBC), a book subscription club for Catholic readers that printed more than seven million books, including great religious classics such as The Story of a Soul, by Thérèse of Lisieux, Theology of the Body, by Pope John Paul II, as well as The Interior Castle, by Teresa of Ávila.

In November 2023, after three years of work, the company launched a groundbreaking edition of the Holy Bible, a revised translation of Father Matos Soares' 1927 work, based on the Vulgate – the most traditional version of Scripture in the Catholic Church, with references to manuscripts and versions in Hebrew and Greek.

This version of the Bible was one of the winners of the 2024 Jabuti Prize in the "Editorial Production" category, receiving the trophy for best cover. In addition, it won two medals for "Editorial Project" at the Brazilian Design Awards. In the second half of 2025, the company began operations in the United States.

In the year of 2019, Matheus founds Lumine, a streaming platform with content designed for the Catholic audiences. That service gathers classic films of Charles Chaplin and Alfred Hitchcock, among others, and also movies and series with religious content, including original productions made by Lumine itself. In just three years Lumine became the biggest Catholic streaming platform in Latin America.

=== Personal life ===
Matheus converted to Catholicism in 2013. He is married with screenwriter and director Julia Sondermann since 2019 – they had three children together.

== Works ==
Year	Title	Credit	Genre
2017	O Jardim das Aflições	Producer and coeditor	Documentary
2018	Os Filhos de Cister	Producer	Miniseries
2020	A Vida de Sara	Producer	Documentary
2021	O Apóstolo do Brasil, A Missão de São José de Anchieta	Executive producer	Documentary
2022	Um Santo Entre Nós	Executive producer and screenwriter	Documentary
2022	A Vida Interior	Executive producer	Miniseries
2022	Deus: A procura	Director	TV special
2024	Brasil de Todos os Santos	Writer	TV series
