= Armando Monteiro Filho =

Brazilian politician

Minister of Agriculture
- In office September 8, 1961 – June 26, 1962
- Prime Minister: Tancredo Neves
- Preceded by: Ricardo Greenhalgh Barreto Filho
- Succeeded by: Renato Costa Lima

Member of the Chamber of Deputies for Pernambuco
- In office 1 February 1955 – 1 February 1963
- Constituency: At-large

Personal details
- Born: Armando de Queiroz Monteiro Filho; September 11, 1925 Recife, Pernambuco, Brazil
- Died: January 2, 2018 (aged 92) Recife, Pernambuco, Brazil
- Party: PSD (1950–1965); MDB (1966–1979); PDT (1980–1998); MDB (1998–2018)
- Children: 5, including Armando Monteiro

Armando de Queiroz Monteiro Filho (September 11, 1925 – January 2, 2018) was a Brazilian businessman, engineer and politician. He served as the country's Minister of Agriculture from 1961 until 1962, in the cabinet of President João Goulart. He was the father of Armando Monteiro, a politician, former national Senator from Pernambuco, and former Minister of Development, Industry and Foreign Trade.

== Biography and career ==
Born in Recife, Monteiro Filho was the son of Armando de Queiroz Monteiro, a former Governor of Pernambuco, and Maria José Dourado de Queiroz Monteiro. His father-in-law was Agamenon Magalhães, another former Governor of Pernambuca (1937–1945, 1951–1952), as well as Minister of Justice and the Interior in 1945. Monteiro graduated from the University of Recife with a degree in engineering in 1945.

Monteiro Filho was elected to the state Legislative Assembly of Pernambuco in 1950 as a member of the now defunct Social Democratic Party (PSD). In 1954, he was elected to the federal Chamber of Deputies, winning the most votes of any Chamber candidate in the entire state of Pernambuco that year.

From 1961 until 1962, he joined the government of President João Goulart as Brazil's federal Minister of Agriculture of Brazil. Monteiro Filho unsuccessfully campaigned for Governor of Pernambuco, but lost to Miguel Arraes in the gubernatorial general election.

Following the 1964 Brazilian coup d'état and ouster of President Goulart, Monteiro Filho switched to the Brazilian Democratic Movement (MDB) during the military dictatorship from 1964 to 1985. He then switched parties and joined the Democratic Labour Party (PDT). He ran for the Federal Senate in 1994 as a PDT candidate, but lost the election. He then switched to the Brazilian Democratic Movement Party (PMDB) again in 1998.

Armando Monteiro Filho died at his home in the Zona Sul neighborhood of Recife on January 2, 2018, at the age of 92. He had been in declining health and had suffered from respiratory illness since December 2017. He was survived by five children, including former Senator Armando Monteiro, eight grandchildren, and six great-grandchildren. He was buried in the Cemitério Morada da Paz in Paulista.

Political offices
| Preceded by Ricardo Greenhalgh Barreto | Minister of Agriculture; 1961–1962 | Succeeded by Renato Costa Lima |
