= Marcos Jorge =

Brazilian politician (born 1979)

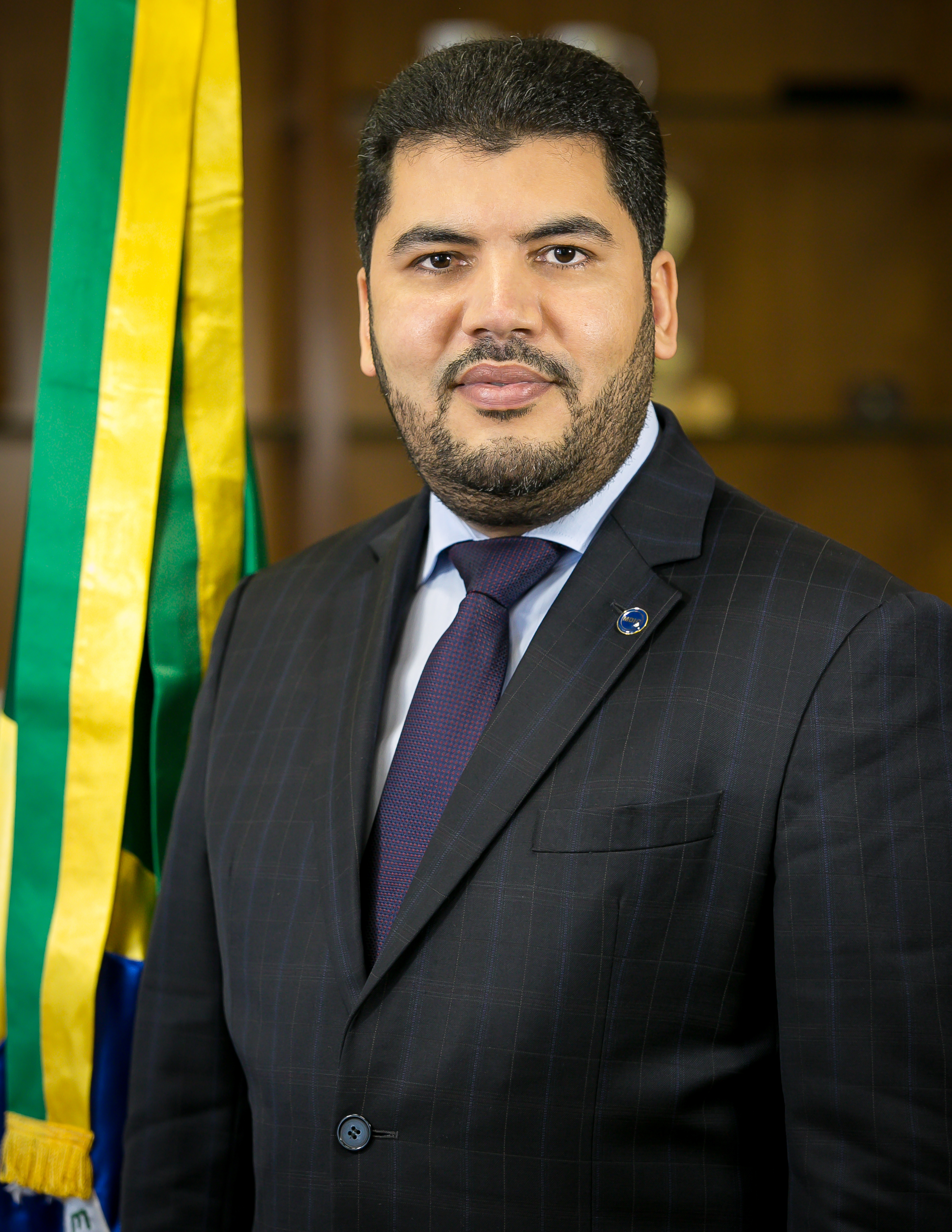
- Jorge in 2018

Member-elect of the Chamber of Deputies
- Assuming office 1 February 2027
- Constituency: Roraima

Member of the Legislative Assembly of Roraima
- Incumbent
- Assumed office 1 January 2023
- Constituency: At-large

Minister of Industry, Foreign Trade and Services
- In office 20 February 2018 – 1 January 2019
- President: Michel Temer
- Preceded by: Marcos Pereira
- Succeeded by: Paulo Guedes

Personal details
- Born: Marcos Jorge de Lima; 31 March 1979 (age 47) Rio de Janeiro, Brazil
- Party: Republicanos

Marcos Jorge de Lima (born 31 March 1979) is a Brazilian politician serving as a member of the Legislative Assembly of Roraima since 2023. From January to December 2018, he served as minister of development, industry, trade and services.

Political offices
Preceded by Marcos Pereira	Minister of Industry, Foreign Trade and Services; 2018–2019	Succeeded by Paulo Guedes as Minister of Economy
