= Fábio Yassuda =

Brazilian politician

Minister of Industry and Commerce
- In office 30 October 1969 – 23 February 1970
- Preceded by: Macedo Soares
- Succeeded by: Pratini de Moraes

Personal details
- Born: Fábio Riodi Yassuda; 30 August 1922 Pindamonhangaba, São Paulo, Brazil
- Died: 19 June 2011 (aged 88) São Paulo, Brazil

Fábio Riodi Yassuda (Japanese: 安田 良治 [Yasuda Ryōji]; 30 August 1922 – 29 June 2011) was a Brazilian politician. He was the first Brazilian government minister of Japanese descent.

== Biography ==
Yassuda was born on 30 August 1922 in Pindamonhangaba, São Paulo, the son of topographer Rioiti Yassuda, who had been based out of the region since the mid-1910s. He was educated in rural schools, developing a liking towards agriculture. In 1939, he moved to Piracicaba to study at the College of Agriculture, University of São Paulo. He worked at the Agricultural Cooperative of Cotia, where he was the director, director-general, and superintendent director of the cooperative.

In the 1960s, Carlos Lacerda attempted to convince Yassuda to accept the position in his government to become the Secretary of the Economy of the State of Guanabara. Yassuda requested for Lacerda to convince the Agriculture Cooperative he worked at to relieve him of his duties. He alleged that he did not want to leave and create conflict with other members of the cooperative. Afterwards, he convinced the director's board of the cooperative to not relieve him. Lacerda still went to Cotia two times to convince the directors, but was denied. The mayor of the city of São Paulo, José Vicente Faria Lima, also attempted to have Yassuda leave, without success.

In 1969, during Paulo Maluf's time as São Paulo, Yassuda was nominated by the Military Dictatorship's National Information Service to become the Secretary of Supply for the municipal government of São Paulo, after a coronel had said to Yassuda's friends that he would either go work for the government or be arrested. Shortly afterwards, it was president Emílio Garrastazu Médici who convinced him to "provide services for the revolution" as Minister of Agriculture. However, the tensions between the dictatorship's plans and his upbringing as a nikkei with regards to agriculture ended with him being appointed as the Minister of Industry and Commerce during the Médici. He served from 30 October 1969 to 23 February 1970, the first nikkei to become a government minister in Brazil.

After his brief political career, he dedicated himself to his own initiatives until 1976. He bought a boat that had been anchored in Paraty, Rio de Janeiro, which also served as his residence for ten years as he sailed the Brazilian coast.
