= Armando Monteiro (politician) =

Brazilian politician and lawyer

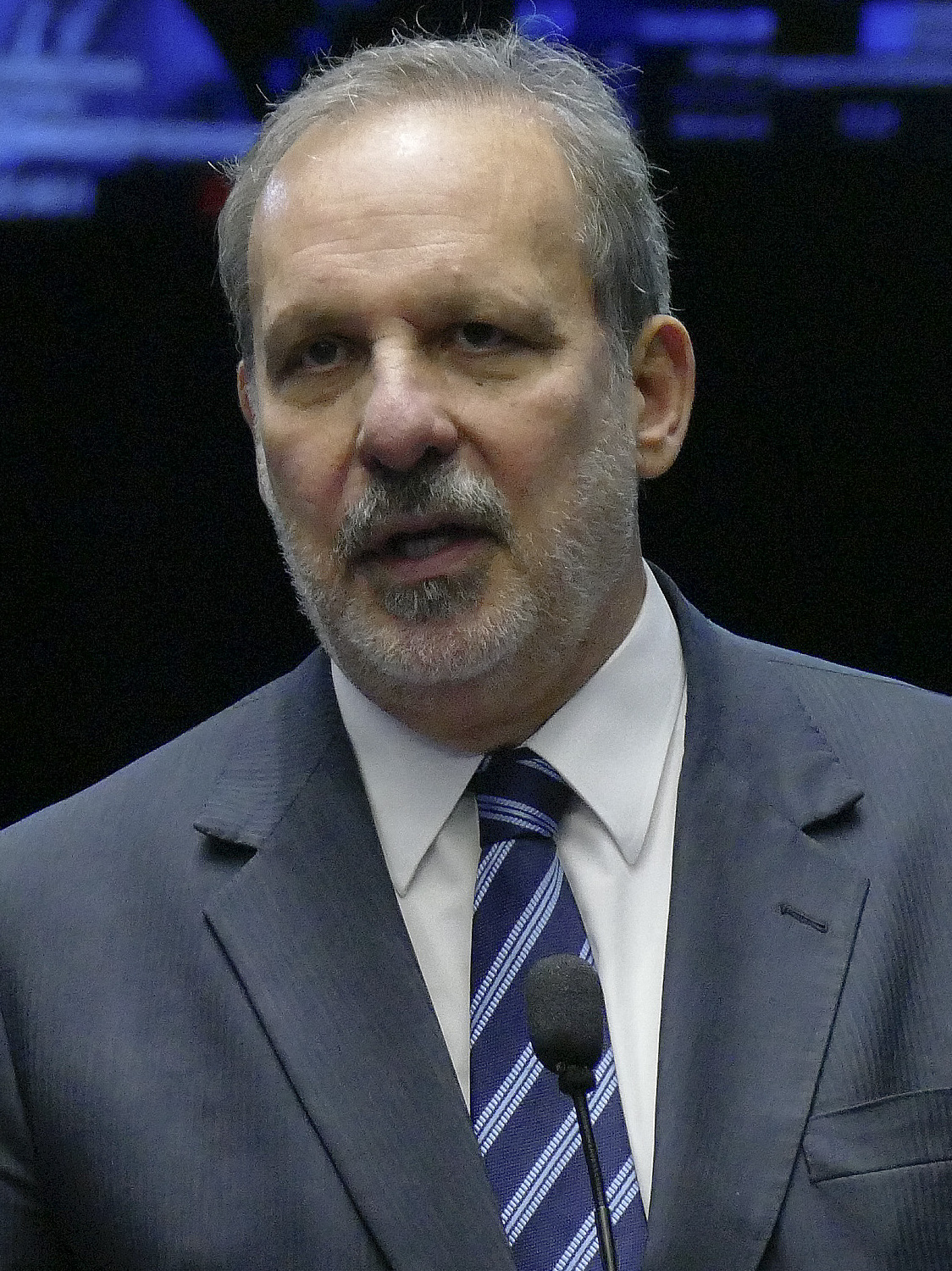
- Monteiro in 2018

Senator
- In office 1 February 2011 – 1 February 2019
- Constituency: Pernambuco

Minister of Development, Industry and Foreign Trade
- In office 1 January 2015 – 9 May 2016
- President: Dilma Rousseff
- Preceded by: Mauro Borges Lemos
- Succeeded by: Marcos Pereira

Federal Deputy
- In office 1 January 1999 – 31 January 2011
- Constituency: Pernambuco

Personal details
- Born: 24 February 1952 (age 74) Recife, Pernambuco
- Party: PODE (2023–present)
- Other political affiliations: PSDB (2022–2023); PTB (2003–2020); PMDB (1997–2003); PSDB (1990–1997)
- Education: Fundação Getulio Vargas
- Profession: Lawyer

Armando Monteiro (born 24 February 1952) is a Brazilian politician and lawyer. He has represented Pernambuco in the Federal Senate from 2011 to 2019. He was the Minister of Development, Industry and Foreign Trade from 2015 to 2016, during the second term of president Dilma Rousseff. Previously he was a Deputy for Pernambuco from 1999 to 2011. He is a member of the Brazilian Social Democracy Party.

Monteiro is the son of the late Armando Monteiro Filho, who served as Minister of Agriculture of Brazil from 1961 to 1962.
