= Minha Biblioteca Católica =

Brazilian publisher

Minha Biblioteca Católica (en: My Catholic Library) is a Brazilian publisher, aimed at the Catholic public. The company distributes the content through a subscription club.

== History ==
=== Planning ===
The club emerged in December 2017, in Dois Irmãos, Rio Grande do Sul, from the idea of three friends — among them producer Matheus Bazzo — who had a common interest: the search for quality Catholic books. With this, My Catholic Library was conceived, operating as a subscription club with monthly sending of works to the public.

=== First step ===
The first shipment was made in January 2018 and there was quickly a high demand. In the first month, subscriptions beat the stock, requiring the closure of the site for two days.

It has printed more than three million copies, including spirituality classics, reissues of religious publications and unpublished works in the country.

== Statistics ==
=== Subscribers ===
Since its inception, the company has counted 150,000 subscribers and has printed more than three million copies. Monthly, boxes are sent with a book related to the Catholic faith, support readings and other items. Today, the Library has 70 employees.

It is the largest religious subscription club in Brazil.

=== Printing plant ===
The base is located in Porto Alegre, with the logistics service being operated in Dois Irmãos.

== Works ==
=== Books ===
Among the published publications are Story of a Soul, by Teresa of Lisieux, Theology of the Body, by St. John Paul II, and Interior Castle, by Teresa d'Ávila.

=== Series ===
In 2019, the company produced the series Sons of Cister, about a group of Cistercian monks in the interior of Rio Grande do Sul.

=== Video service ===
The production was the kickoff to the creation of Lumine TV, an on-demand video service aimed at Catholic audiences.
