= Vivi Reis =

Brazilian physiotherapist, popular educator, feminist and political militant

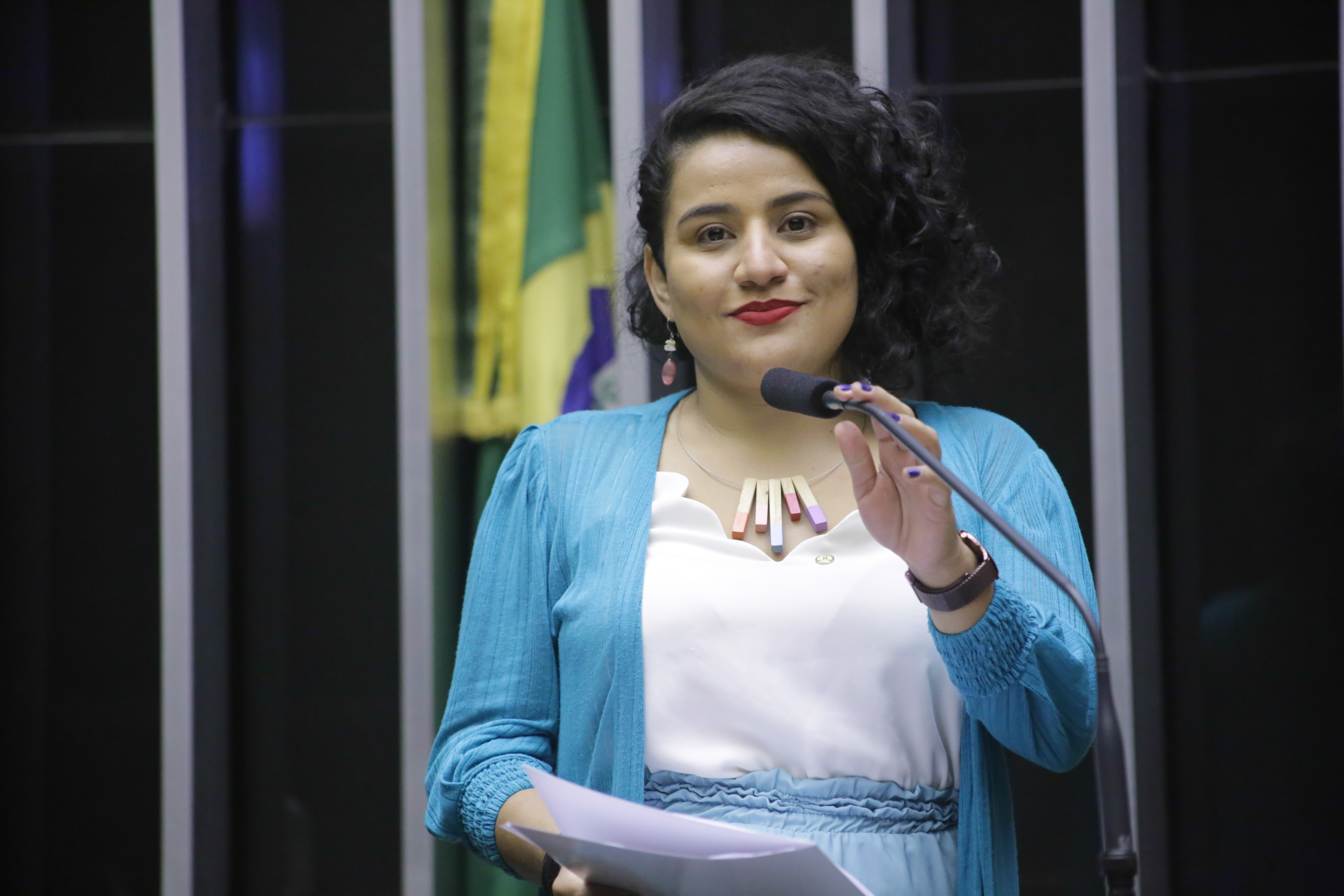

Federal Deputy from Pará
- Incumbent
- Assumed office 1 January 2021

Personal details
- Born: Viviane da Costa Reis; 5 August 1991 (age 35) Belém, Pará, Brazil
- Party: PSOL (2011–present)
- Education: Pará State University (BPT)
- Profession: Physiotherapist and politician

Viviane da Costa Reis (born 5 August 1991 in Belém) is a Brazilian physiotherapist, popular educator, feminist and political militant, member of the Socialism and Liberty Party (PSOL). She is currently Federal Deputy from Pará.

== Biography ==
Bachelor of Physiotherapy at the Pará State University (UEPA) in 2013, with specialization at the Federal University of Pará (UFPA) concluded in 2016, she was the first woman of her family to attend a university. Filiated to PSOL in 2011 and participated in many student unions in her neighbourhood, church and school. In the student union, she was part of UEPA Students' Central Directory. Reis is educator of Rede Emancipa.

Her first electoral experience was in 2018, when she was candidate for Federal Deputy and received 22,297, being the party's first substitute. In the 2020 municipal elections, Reis was the most voted woman of Belém for City Councillor, elected with 9,654 votes.

With the election of then Federal Deputy Edmilson Rodrigues as Mayor of Belém, Vivi Reis took office as a member of the Chamber of Deputies on 1 January 2021, becoming the first Brazilian black LGBT congresswoman.

== Electoral history ==
Year	Election	Coalition	Party	Office	Votes	Result
2018	Pará Statewide	Together for Change (PSOL, PPL, PCB)	PSOL	Federal Deputy	22,297 (0.64%)	Substitute
2020	Belém Municipal	PSOL		City Councillor	9,645 (1.32%)	Elect
