= Léo Motta =

Brazilian politician (born 1973)

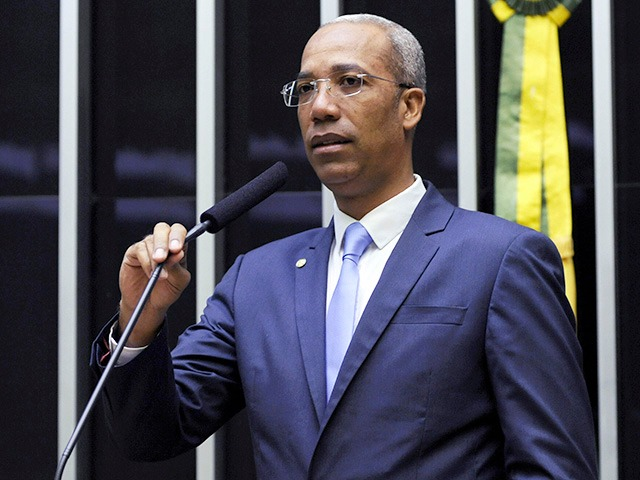
- Motta in 2021

Member of the Chamber of Deputies
- In office 1 February 2019 – 31 January 2023
- Constituency: Minas Gerais

Personal details
- Born: 26 October 1973 (age 52)
- Party: Republicans (since 2022)

Eliel Márcio do Carmo (born 26 October 1973), better known as Léo Motta, is a Brazilian politician. From 2019 to 2023, he was a member of the Chamber of Deputies. He previously served as president of the Christian Labour Party and as secretary general of Progressistas.
