= Paulo Guedes (politician, born 1970) =

Brazilian politician (born 1970)

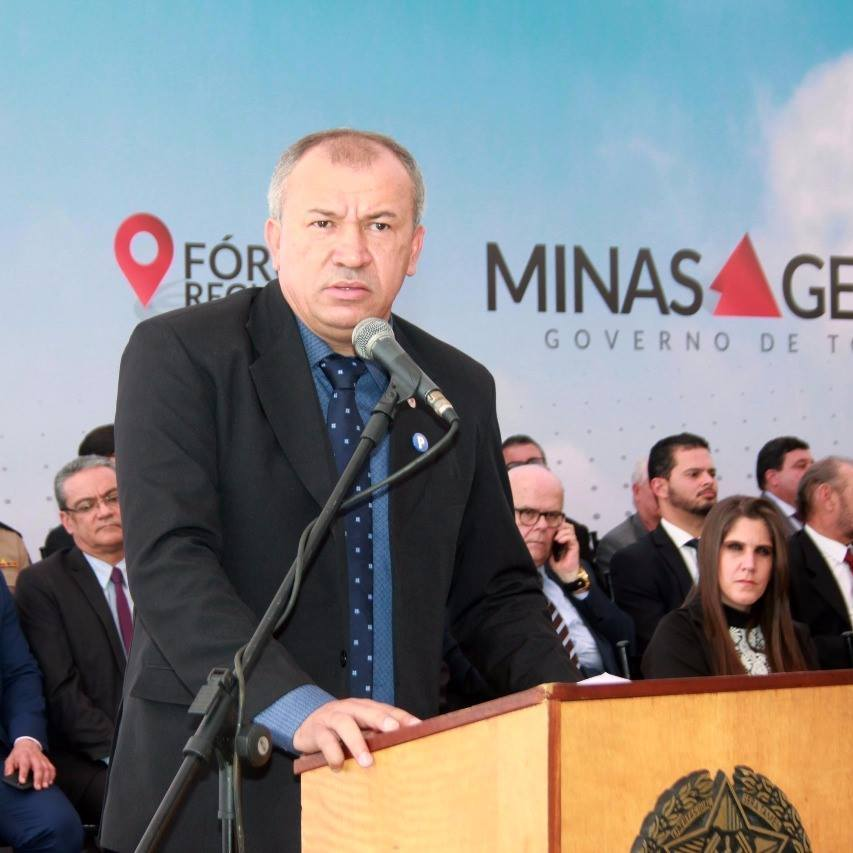
- Guedes in 2017

Member of the Chamber of Deputies
- Incumbent
- Assumed office 1 February 2019
- Constituency: Minas Gerais

Personal details
- Born: 1 October 1970 (age 55)
- Party: Workers' Party (since 1992)

Paulo José Carlos Guedes (born 1 October 1970) is a Brazilian politician serving as a member of the Chamber of Deputies since 2019. From 2007 to 2019, he was a member of the Legislative Assembly of Minas Gerais.
