= Fred Costa =

Brazilian politician (born 1977)

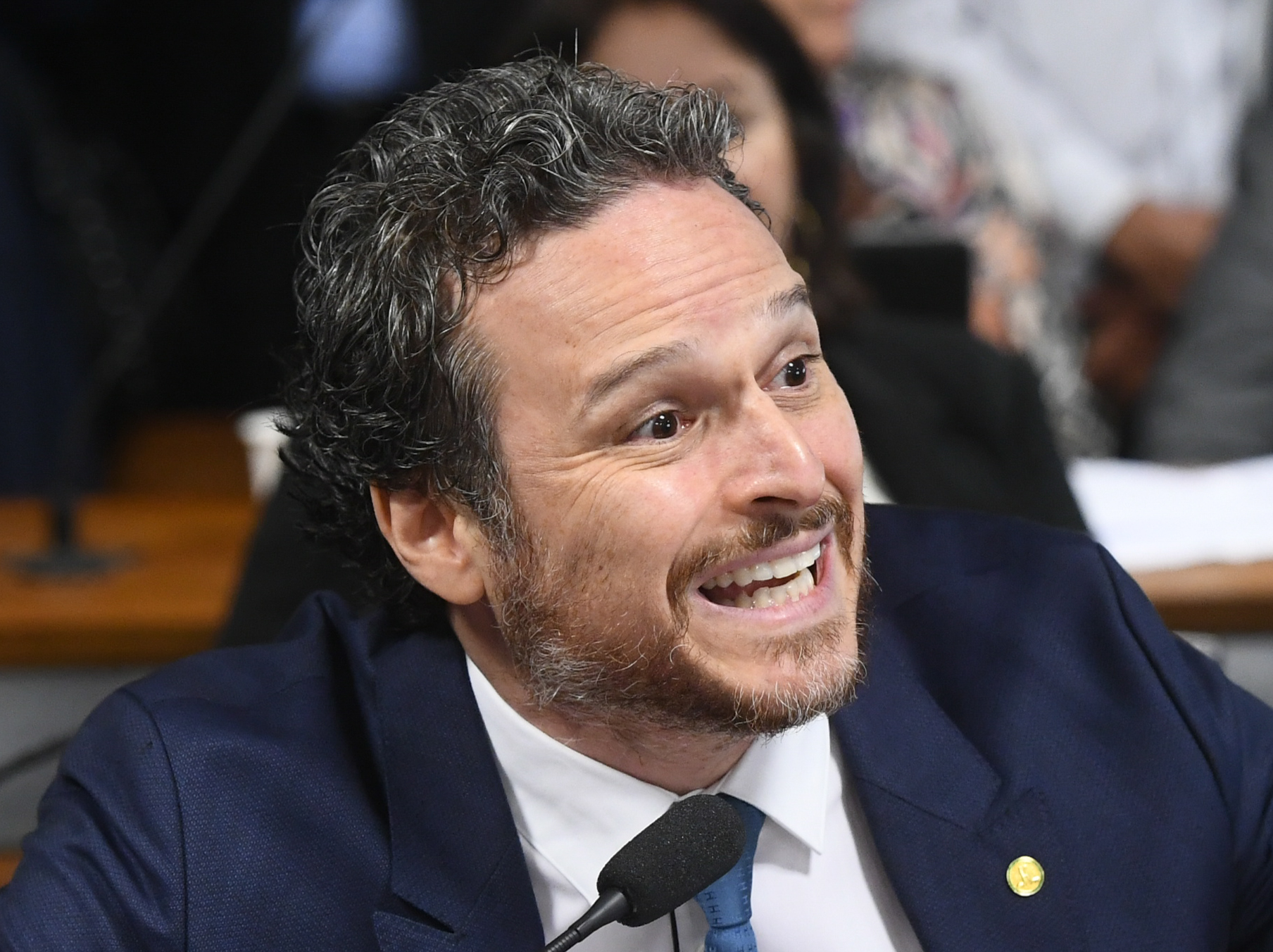
- Costa in 2020

Member of the Chamber of Deputies
- Incumbent
- Assumed office 1 February 2019
- Constituency: Minas Gerais

Personal details
- Born: 12 July 1977 (age 48)
- Party: Democratic Renewal Party (since 2023)

Frederico Borges da Costa (born 12 July 1977) is a Brazilian politician serving as a member of the Chamber of Deputies since 2019. From 2011 to 2019, he was a member of the Legislative Assembly of Minas Gerais.
