= Josias Teófilo =

Brazilian director and filmmaker (1987-)

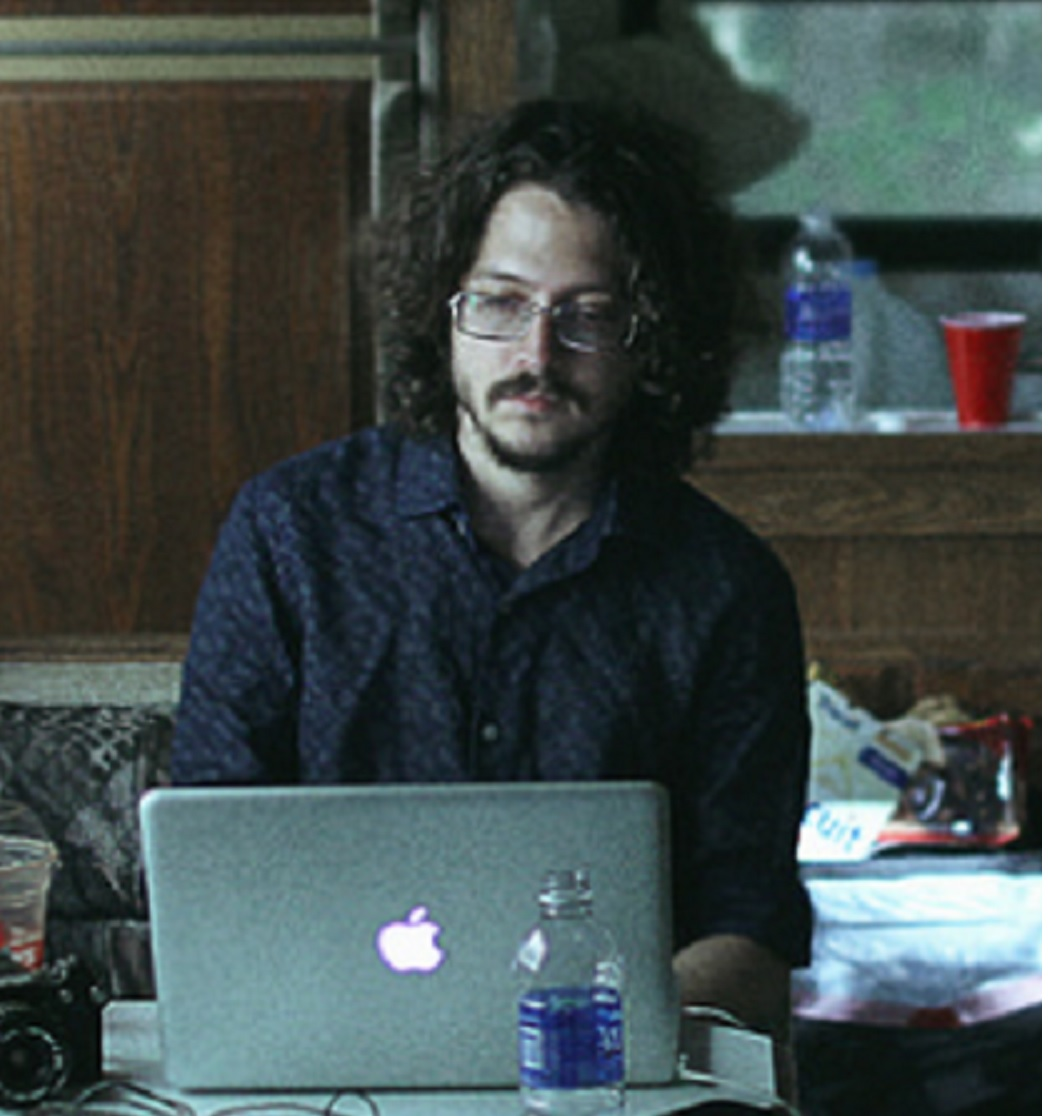
Josias Teófilo in 2015.

Josias Saraiva Monteiro Teófilo (born August 27, 1987, in Recife) is a Brazilian film director, photographer, journalist, and writer.

== Works ==
He directed The Garden of Afflictions (2017), an award-winning documentary that portrays the life, philosophy, and daily routine of the Brazilian intellectual Olavo de Carvalho.

As a journalist, he worked for the magazine Continente, where he interviewed personalities such as Hélène Grimaud, Boris Schnaiderman, Phillipe Jarrousky and Paulo Mendes da Rocha.

In 2021, he completed the documentary Nem Tudo Se Desfaz, which focuses on the impeachment of Dilma Rousseff and on the election of Conservative president Jair Bolsonaro.
