= Soraya Santos =

Brazilian politician (born 1958)

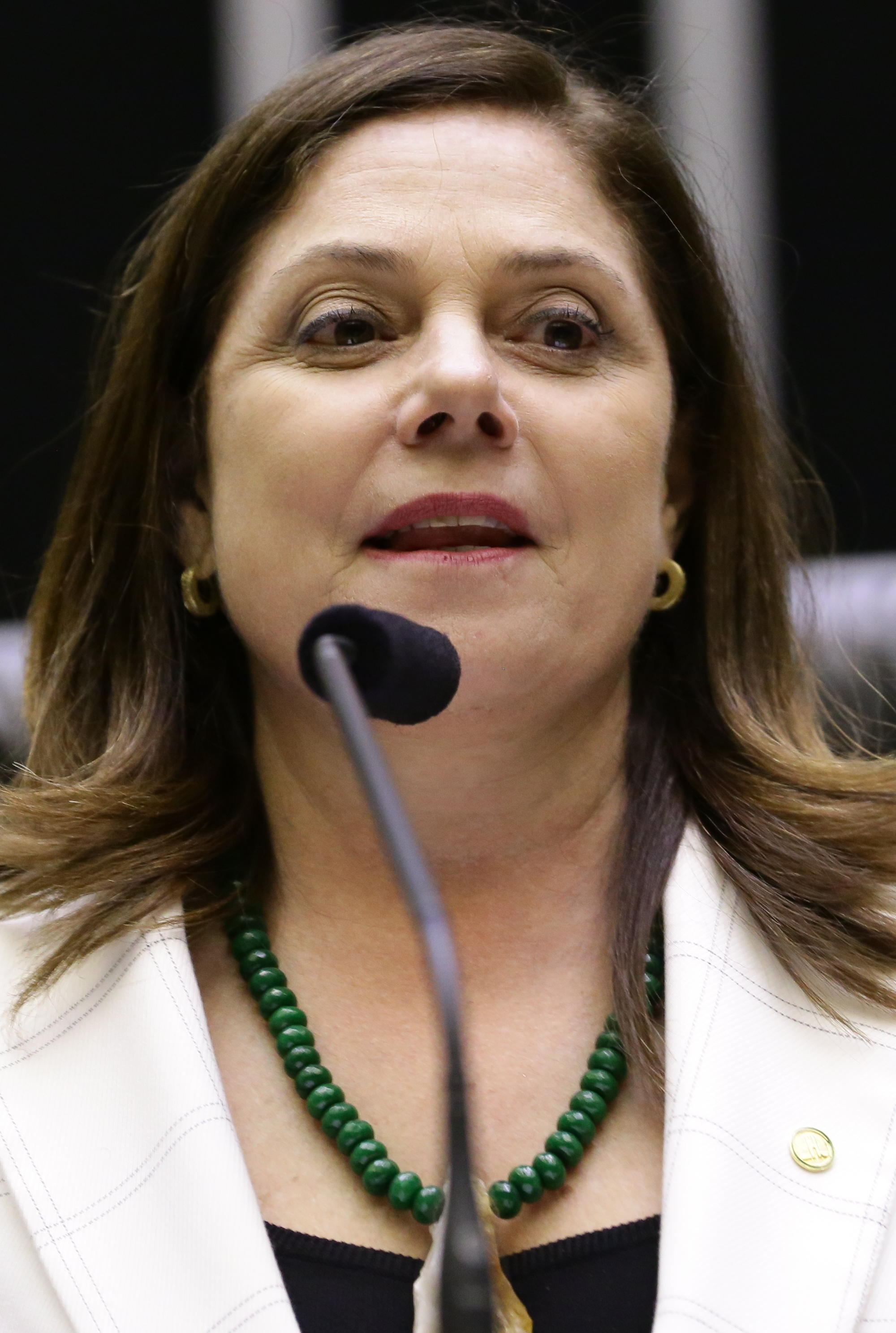
- Santos in 2019

Member of the Chamber of Deputies
- Incumbent
- Assumed office 1 February 2015
- Constituency: Rio de Janeiro

Personal details
- Born: Soraya Alencar dos Santos; 4 December 1958 (age 67) Macaé, Rio de Janeiro, Brazil
- Party: PL (2018–present)
- Other political affiliations: PDT (1980–1988); PSDB (1988–2005); MDB (2005–2018)

Soraya Alencar dos Santos (born 4 December 1958) more commonly known as Soraya Santos is a Brazilian politician as well as being a lawyer.

She is a federal deputy representing the state of Rio de Janeiro since 2015.

== Personal life ==
Santos was born to Alan Guerra de Alencar and Cleyde Maria Guerra de Alencar. Before she became a politician Santos worked as a lawyer. Santos is married to politician Alexandre Santos.

== Political career ==
Santos voted in favor of the impeachment motion of then-president Dilma Rousseff. Santos voted against a similar corruption investigation into Rousseff's successor Michel Temer. She voted in favor of the 2017 Brazilian labor reforms.

=== Electoral history ===
Year	Election	Party	Office	Coalition	Partners	Party	Votes	Percent	Result
2000	Municipal Election of Niterói	PSDB	Mayor	Sou Mais Niterói (PSDB, PHS, PAN)	Raul Portugal	PSDB	41,062	14.26%	Not elected
2002	State Elections of Rio de Janeiro	PSDB	State Deputy	PFL, PMDB, PSDB	—N/a		22,089	0.31%	Surrogate
2014	State Elections of Rio de Janeiro	PMDB	Federal Deputy	PMDB, PP, PSC, PSD, PTB	—N/a		48,024	0.68%	Elected
2018	State Elections of Rio de Janeiro	PR	Federal Deputy	Juntos pelo Rio (PODE, PR)	—N/a		48,328	0.68%	Elected
2022	State Elections of Rio de Janeiro	PL	Federal Deputy	—N/a			130,379	1.50%	Elected
2026	State Elections of Rio de Janeiro	PL	Federal Deputy	—N/a			141,443	1.60%	Elected
