= Marcel van Hattem =

Brazilian politician

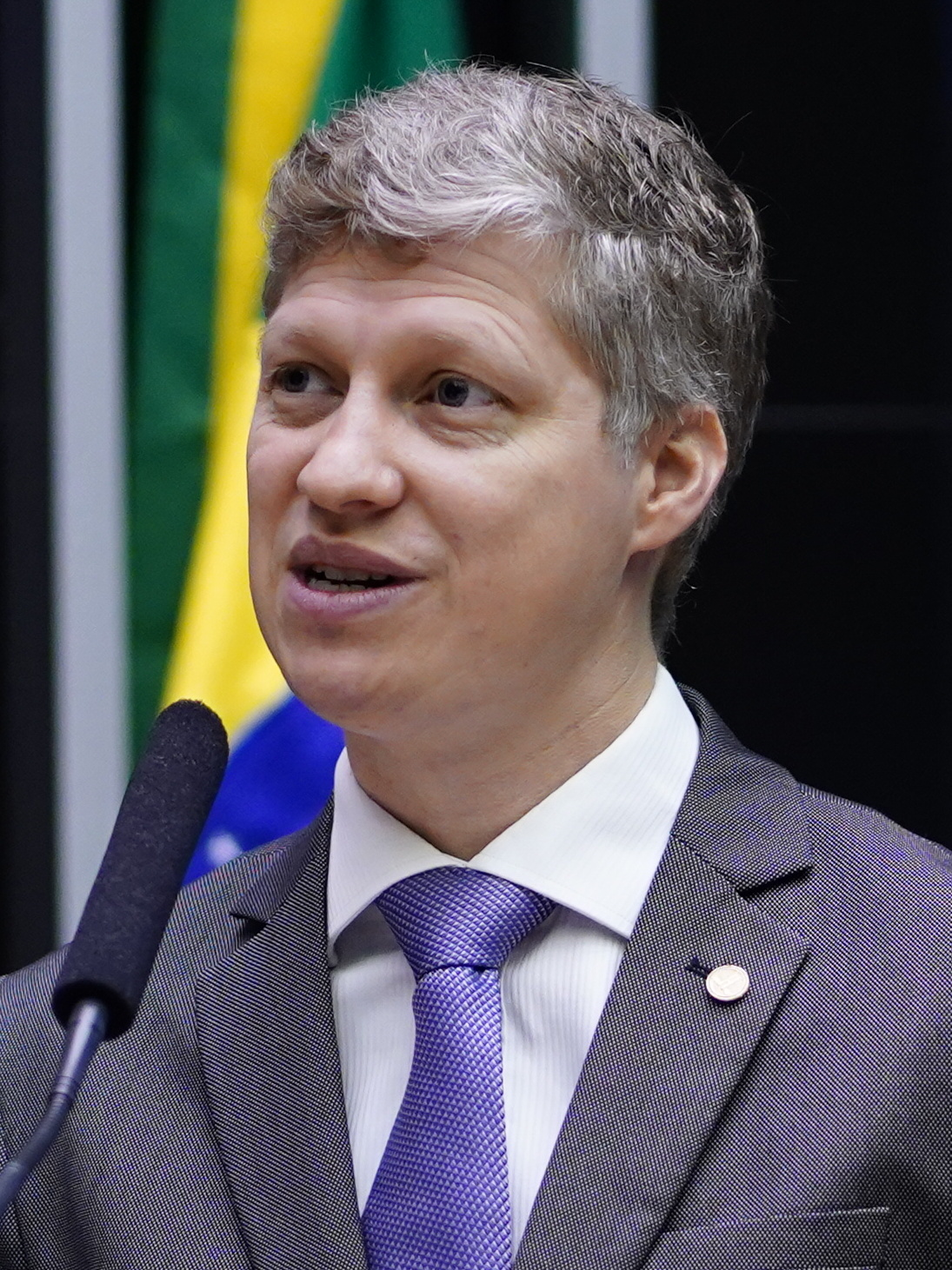

Senator-elect for Rio Grande do Sul
- Assuming office 1 February 2027

Federal Deputy
- Incumbent
- Assumed office 1 February 2019
- Constituency: Rio Grande do Sul

State Deputy of Rio Grande do Sul
- In office 10 February 2015 – 27 February 2018
- Constituency: At-large

Councillor of Dois Irmãos
- In office 1 January 2005 – 1 January 2009
- Constituency: At-large

Personal details
- Born: 11 August 1985 (age 41) São Leopoldo, Rio Grande do Sul, Brazil
- Party: NOVO (2018–present)
- Other political affiliations: PP (2004−2018)
- Education: Federal University of Rio Grande do Sul; Leiden University; Aarhus University
- Website: http://www.marcelvanhattem.com.br

Marcel van Hattem (born 8 November 1985) is a Brazilian political scientist, journalist, international relations consultant and politician. He currently serves in Brazil's Chamber of Deputies and is known for his conservative views.

Van Hattem received a BA degree in International Relations from the Federal University of Rio Grande do Sul (UFRGS) and MA degree in Political Science from Leiden University, and also a master's degree in journalism, media and globalization, with a specialization in media and politics from Aarhus University (Denmark) and the University of Amsterdam.

== Electoral history ==
Year	Election	Party	Office	Coalition	Partners	Party	Votes	Percent	Result
2004	Municipal Election of Dois Irmãos	PP	Councillor	Union for Dois Irmãos - The Safe Path (PP, PTB, PMDB)	—N/a		697	4.37%	Elected
2006	State Elections of Rio Grande do Sul	PP	State Deputy	—N/a			11,656	0.19%	Surrogate
2010	State Elections of Rio Grande do Sul	PP	State Deputy	—N/a			14,068	0.25%	Surrogate
2014	State Elections of Rio Grande do Sul	PP	State Deputy	—N/a			35,345	0.58%	Surrogate
2018	State Elections of Rio Grande do Sul	NOVO	Federal Deputy	—N/a			349,855	5.99%	Elected
2022	State Elections of Rio Grande do Sul	NOVO	Federal Deputy	—N/a			256,913	4.18%	Elected
2026	State Elections of Rio Grande do Sul	NOVO	Senator	Rio Grande Can Do More (PL, UNIÃO, PP, NOVO, PODE, Republicanos, DC)	Sérgio Turra	PP	3,449,053	30.08%	Elected
2026	State Elections of Rio Grande do Sul	NOVO	Senator	Rio Grande Can Do More (PL, UNIÃO, PP, NOVO, PODE, Republicanos, DC)	Ricardo Jobim	NOVO	3,449,053	30.08%	Elected
