= Baleia Rossi =

Brazilian politician (born 1972)

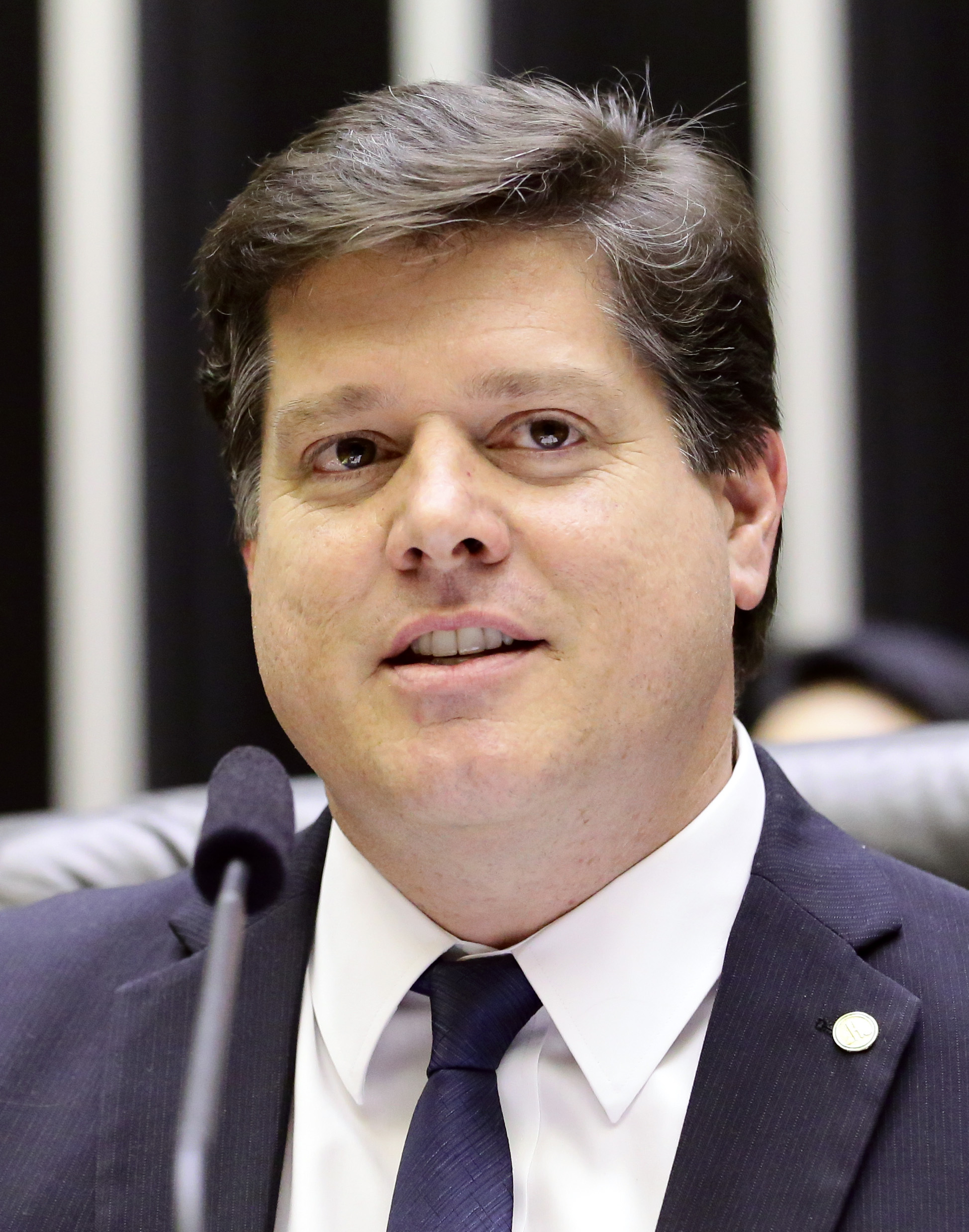

Member of the Chamber of Deputies
- Incumbent
- Assumed office 1 February 2015
- Constituency: São Paulo

MDB National President
- Incumbent
- Assumed office 6 October 2019
- Preceded by: Romero Jucá

Member of the Legislative Assembly of São Paulo
- In office 15 March 2003 – 1 February 2015
- Constituency: At-large

Member of the Municipal Chamber of Ribeirão Preto
- In office 1 January 1993 – 15 March 2003
- Constituency: At-large

Personal details
- Born: Luiz Felipe Tenuto Rossi; 9 June 1972 (age 54) São Paulo, Brazil
- Party: MDB (1992–present)
- Profession: Entrepreneur
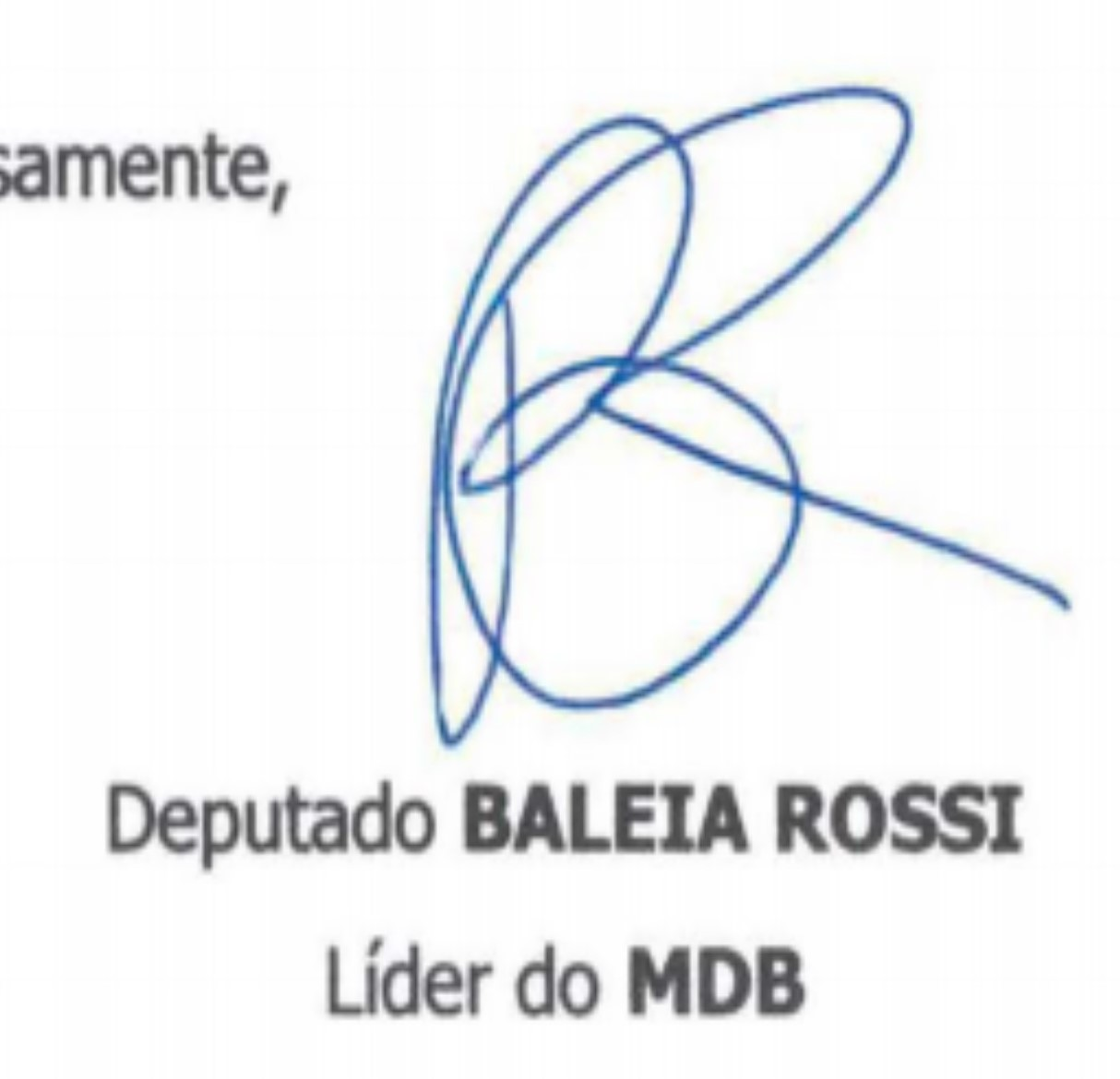
- Signature

Luiz Felipe Baleia Tenuto Rossi (born 9 June 1972), commonly known as Baleia Rossi, is a Brazilian politician and entrepreneur, incumbent Federal Deputy from São Paulo and National President of the Brazilian Democratic Movement (MDB).

Born in the state, he lives in Ribeirão Preto, where his family built their strong political bounds. It was in Ribeirão Preto where Baleia Rossi began his professional career, as entrepreneur, and joined the political life.

Rossi is son of former Deputy and former Minister of Agriculture, Livestock and Supply, Wagner Rossi.

== Political life ==
At the age of 20, in 1992, Rossi was elected City Councillor of Ribeirão Preto, being re-elected two more times in 1996 and 2000. During this period, he was also Municipal Secretary of Sports.

In 2002, he left the Municipal Chamber to begin his term as State Deputy, when he was elected with 77,641 votes.

In 2004, he ran for Mayor of Ribeirão Preto, losing the race in the second round for the former Federal Deputy, Welson Gasparini (PSDB).

In 2006, he was chosen Leader of the PMDB Caucus in the Legislative Assembly and re-elected State Deputy.

From 2011 to 2019, Rossi was State President of the PMDB in São Paulo.

Baleia Rossi was elected for his first term as Federal Deputy in 2014 for the 55th Legislature of the National Congress. During his term, he voted to impeach the then-President Dilma Rousseff and in favor of the Constitutional Amendment to limit public expenses (PEC 241) in 2016. In 2017, he was favorable to the Labour Reform (PL 6787/2016) and voted against the two complaints of the Federal Public Prosecutor's Office (MPF) against President Michel Temer in August and in October.

In 2019, Rossi was elected National President of MDB, succeeding former Senator Romero Jucá.

In the end of 2020, Rossi was chosen by the President of the Chamber of Deputies, Rodrigo Maia, to succeed him in the Presidency of the House.

=== Candidate for President of the Chamber of Deputies ===
On 23 December 2020, the President of the Chamber, Rodrigo Maia, and leaders of parties that composed a bloc to run for the House's presidency, announced the candidacy of Deputy Baleia Rossi for the command of the Chamber. At first, Rossi had the support of 11 parties for the 1 February voting: PSL, MDB, PSDB, DEM, Cidadania, PV, REDE, PT, PCdoB, PSB and PDT. The objective of the group was to defeat the candidate supported by President Jair Bolsonaro, the Deputy Arthur Lira.

== Controversies ==
=== Fraud in school meals of São Paulo ===
In February 2016, he was cited in a testimony by lobbyist Marcel Júlio, that he extorted school meals providers for public school of São Paulo. Besides Baleia, other participants of the scheme cited were the Federal Deputy Nelson Marquezelli (PTB), and State Deputies Fernando Capez (PSDB) and Luiz Carkis Godim (SD).

In December 2016, the former President of the Financial Operations and Activities Council (Coaf), Cassio Chebabi, revealed the involvement of deputies of many parties, but denied the participation of Baleia Rossi. In 2018, the inquiry against Rossi was archived by Justice Gilmar Mendes of the Supreme Federal Court, after request of the Prosecutor General Raquel Dodge.

Party political offices
Preceded by Romero Jucá	MDB National President; 2019–present	Incumbent
