= Ministry of Development, Industry, Trade and Services =

Government agency in Brazil

- Portuguese: Ministério do Desenvolvimento, Indústria, Comércio e Serviços
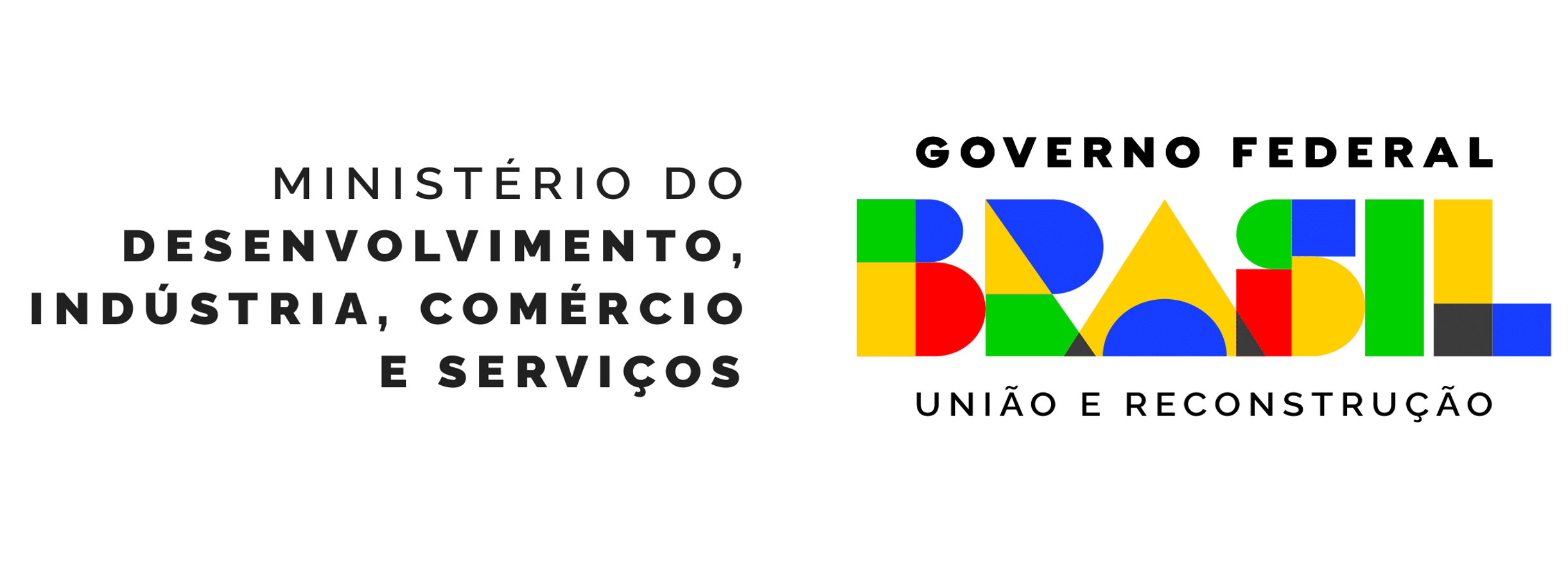

Agency overview
- Formed: 31 January 1961; 65 years ago
- Type: Ministry
- Jurisdiction: Federal government of Brazil
- Headquarters: Esplanada dos Ministérios, Bloco F Brasília, Federal District
- Annual budget: $2.57 b BRL (2023)
- Agency executives: Geraldo Alckmin, Minister; Márcio Elias Rosa, Executive-Secretary; Tatiana Prazeres, Secretary of Foreign Trade; Uallace Moreira, Secretary of Industrial Development, Innovation, Trade and Services; Rodrigo Rollemberg, Secretary of Green Economy, Decarbonization and Bioindustry; Andrea Macera, Secretary of Competitiveness and Regulatory Policy
- Website: www.gov.br/mdic/

The Ministry of Development, Industry, Trade and Services (Portuguese: Ministério do Desenvolvimento, Indústria, Comércio e Serviços, abbreviated MDIC) is a cabinet-level federal ministry in Brazil. The last Minister of Development, Industry and Foreign Trade is Marcos Jorge. The incumbent minister is Vice President Geraldo Alckmin.

The ministry used to oversee the Brazilian National Bank for Economic and Social Development (BNDES), the National Institute of Industrial Property (INPI), the National Institute of Metrology, Quality and Technology (INMETRO) and the Superintendence of the Manaus Free Trade Zone (SUFRAMA). The minister of Development, Industry and Foreign Trade also chairs the Chamber of Foreign Trade (CAMEX), a 7-ministers of State board linked to the Presidency of the Republic.

== Ministers ==
No.	Portrait	Minister	Took office	Left office	Time in office	Party	President
1	Artur Bernardes Filho	Artur Bernardes Filho (1906–1981)	31 January 1961	25 August 1961	206 days	PR	Jânio Quadros (PTN)

No.	Portrait	Minister	Took office	Left office	Time in office	Party	Prime Minister
2	Ulysses Guimarães	Ulysses Guimarães (1916–1992)	8 September 1961	18 September 1962	1 year, 10 days	PSD	Getúlio Vargas (PSD); Brochado da Rocha (PSD)
3	Otávio Dias Carneiro	Otávio Dias Carneiro (1912–1968)	18 September 1962	24 January 1963	128 days	Independent	Hermes Lima (PTB)

No.	Portrait	Minister	Took office	Left office	Time in office	Party	President
4	Antônio Balbino	Antônio Balbino (1912–1992)	24 January 1963	27 June 1963	154 days	PSD	João Goulart (PTB)
5	Egídio Michaelsen	Egídio Michaelsen (1908–1972)	27 June 1963	31 March 1964	278 days	PTB	João Goulart (PTB)
6	Otávio Gouveia de Bulhões	Otávio Gouveia de Bulhões (1906–1990)	4 April 1964	15 April 1964	11 days	Independent	Ranieri Mazzilli (PSD)
7	Daniel Agostinho Faraco	Daniel Agostinho Faraco (1911–2009)	15 April 1964	13 January 1966	1 year, 273 days	PSD	Castelo Branco (Military dictatorship)
8	Paulo Egydio Martins	Paulo Egydio Martins (1928–2021)	13 January 1966	15 March 1967	1 year, 61 days	ARENA	Castelo Branco (ARENA)
9	Macedo Soares	Macedo Soares (1901–1989)	15 March 1967	30 October 1969	2 years, 229 days	ARENA	Costa e Silva (ARENA); Provisory Governative Junta (Military junta)
10	Fábio Riodi Yassuda	Fábio Riodi Yassuda (1922–2011)	30 October 1969	23 February 1970	116 days	Independent	Emílio Garrastazu Médici (ARENA)
11	Pratini de Moraes	Pratini de Moraes (born 1939)	23 February 1970	15 March 1974	4 years, 20 days	Independent	Emílio Garrastazu Médici (ARENA)
12	Severo Gomes	Severo Gomes (1924–1992)	15 March 1974	8 February 1977	2 years, 330 days	ARENA	Ernesto Geisel (ARENA)
13	Ângelo Calmon de Sá	Ângelo Calmon de Sá (born 1935)	8 February 1977	15 March 1979	2 years, 35 days	Independent	Ernesto Geisel (ARENA)
14	João Camilo Penna	João Camilo Penna (1925–2021)	15 March 1979	21 August 1984	5 years, 159 days	Independent	João Figueiredo (ARENA)
15	Murilo Badaró	Murilo Badaró (1931–2010)	21 August 1984	15 March 1985	206 days	PDS	João Figueiredo (PDS)
16	Roberto Herbster Gusmão	Roberto Herbster Gusmão (1923–2019)	15 March 1985	14 February 1986	336 days	MDB	José Sarney (MDB)
17	José Hugo Castelo Branco	José Hugo Castelo Branco (1926–1988)	14 February 1986	4 August 1988	2 years, 172 days	MDB	José Sarney (MDB)
18	Luiz André Rico Vicente	Luiz André Rico Vicente (born 1947)	4 August 1988	17 August 1988	13 days	Independent	José Sarney (MDB)
19	Roberto Cardoso Alves	Roberto Cardoso Alves (1927–1996)	17 August 1988	15 March 1990	1 year, 210 days	PTB	José Sarney (MDB)
20	José Eduardo de Andrade Vieira	José Eduardo de Andrade Vieira (1938–2015)	19 October 1992	23 December 1993	1 year, 65 days	PTB	Itamar Franco (MDB)
21	Ailton Barcelos Fernandes	Ailton Barcelos Fernandes (born 1947)	23 December 1993	25 January 1994	33 days	Independent	Itamar Franco (MDB)
22	Élcio Álvares	Élcio Álvares (1932–2016)	25 January 1994	1 January 1995	341 days	PFL	Itamar Franco (MDB)
23	Dorothea Werneck	Dorothea Werneck (born 1948)	1 January 1995	30 April 1996	1 year, 120 days	Independent	Fernando Henrique Cardoso (PSDB)
24	Francisco Dornelles	Francisco Dornelles (1935–2023)	6 May 1996	30 March 1998	1 year, 328 days	PP	Fernando Henrique Cardoso (PSDB)
25	José Botafogo Gonçalves	José Botafogo Gonçalves (1935–2024)	30 March 1998	1 January 1999	277 days	Independent	Fernando Henrique Cardoso (PSDB)
26	Celso Lafer	Celso Lafer (born 1941)	1 January 1999	18 July 1999	198 days	Independent	Fernando Henrique Cardoso (PSDB)
27	Clóvis Carvalho	Clóvis Carvalho (born 1938)	18 July 1999	8 September 1999	52 days	PSDB	Fernando Henrique Cardoso (PSDB)
28	Alcides Lopes Tápias	Alcides Lopes Tápias (born 1942)	14 September 1999	31 July 2001	1 year, 320 days	Independent	Fernando Henrique Cardoso (PSDB)
29	Sérgio Amaral	Sérgio Amaral (1944–2023)	31 July 2001	1 January 2003	1 year, 154 days	Independent	Fernando Henrique Cardoso (PSDB)
30	Luiz Fernando Furlan	Luiz Fernando Furlan (born 1946)	1 January 2003	29 March 2007	4 years, 87 days	Independent	Luiz Inácio Lula da Silva (PT)
31	Miguel Jorge	Miguel Jorge (born 1945)	29 March 2007	1 January 2011	3 years, 278 days	Independent	Luiz Inácio Lula da Silva (PT)
32	Fernando Pimentel	Fernando Pimentel (born 1951)	1 January 2011	14 February 2014	3 years, 44 days	PT	Dilma Rousseff (PT)
33	Mauro Borges Lemos	Mauro Borges Lemos (born 1954)	14 February 2014	1 January 2015	321 days	Independent	Dilma Rousseff (PT)
34	Armando Monteiro	Armando Monteiro (born 1952)	1 January 2015	12 May 2016	1 year, 132 days	PTB	Dilma Rousseff (PT)
35	Marcos Pereira	Marcos Pereira (born 1972)	12 May 2016	3 January 2018	1 year, 236 days	Republicanos	Michel Temer (MDB)
36	Marcos Jorge	Marcos Jorge (born 1979)	3 January 2018	1 January 2019	363 days	Republicanos	Michel Temer (MDB)
37	Geraldo Alckmin	Geraldo Alckmin (born 1952)	1 January 2023	Incumbent	3 years, 290 days	PSB	Luiz Inácio Lula da Silva (PT)
