= Marcos Pereira (politician) =

Brazilian politician (born 1972)

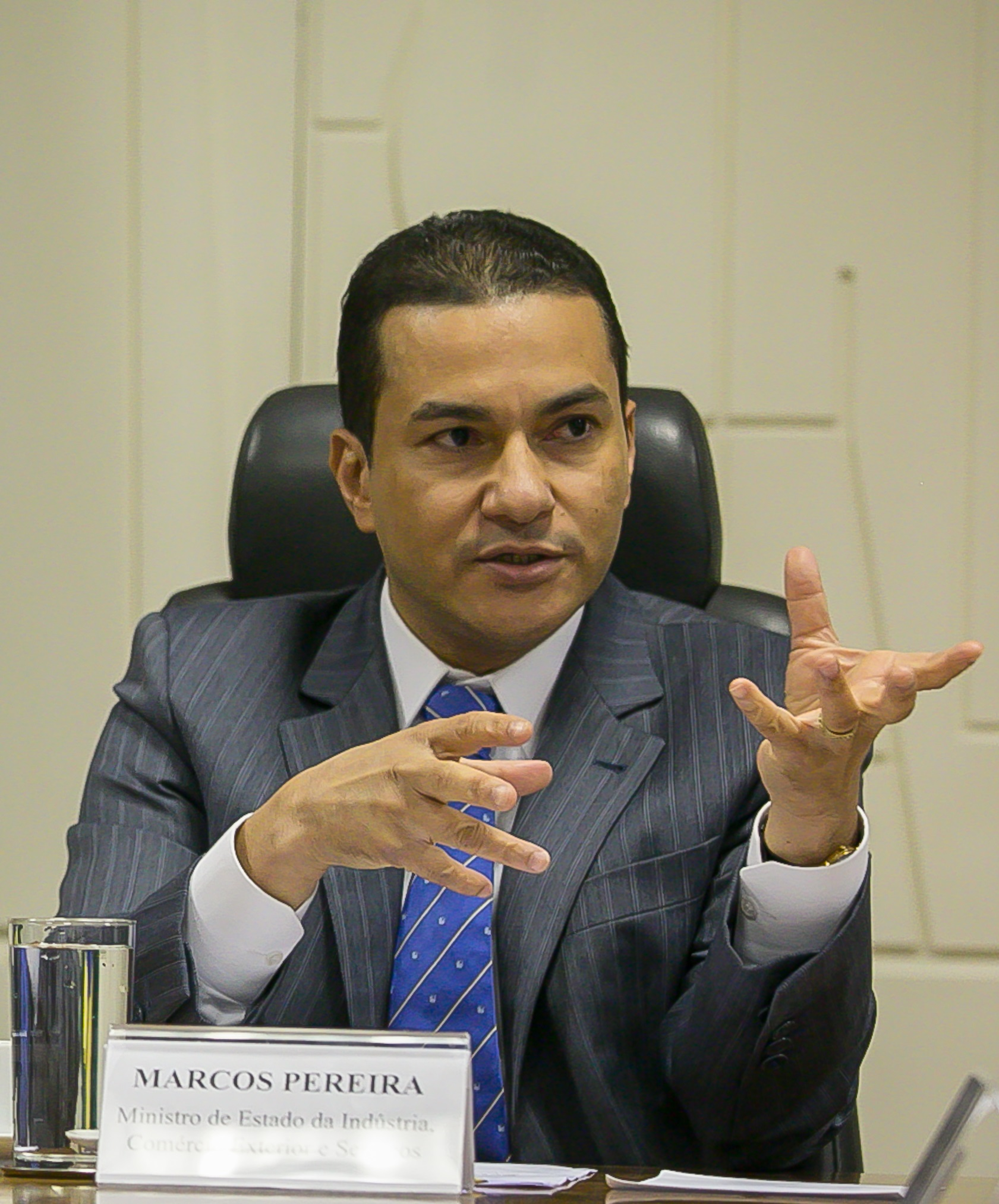

Member of the Chamber of Deputies
- Incumbent
- Assumed office 1 February 2019
- Constituency: São Paulo

Republicanos National President
- Incumbent
- Assumed office 3 January 2018
- Preceded by: Eduardo Lopes (acting)
- In office 9 May 2011 – 12 May 2016
- Preceded by: Vitor Paulo Araújo dos Santos
- Succeeded by: Eduardo Lopes (acting)

Minister of Industry, Foreign Trade and Services
- In office 12 May 2016 – 3 January 2018
- President: Michel Temer
- Preceded by: Armando Monteiro
- Succeeded by: Marcos Jorge

Personal details
- Born: Marcos Antônio Pereira; 4 April 1972 (age 54) Linhares, Espírito Santo, Brazil
- Party: Republicanos (2010–present)
- Other political affiliations: PSB (2005–2010)
- Education: Mackenzie Presbyterian University
- Profession: Lawyer, bishop

Religious life
- Religion: Christian
- Denomination: Neopentecostal
- Church: Universal Church of the Kingdom of God

Marcos Antônio Pereira (born 4 April 1972 in Linhares) is a Brazilian lawyer and discharged bishop of the Universal Church of the Kingdom of God and politician. He is the current president of the Republicans, and former Minister of Industry, Foreign Trade and Services, appointed by president Michel Temer. He resigned from cabinet and as minister on 3 January 2018 to deal with "personal and partisan affairs".

Political offices
Preceded by Armando Monteiro	Minister of Industry, Foreign Trade and Services; 2016–2018	Succeeded by Marcos Jorge
Party political offices
Preceded by Vitor Paulo Araújo dos Santos	Republicanos National President; 2011–2016	Succeeded by Eduardo Lopes (acting)
Preceded by Eduardo Lopes (acting)	Republicanos National President; 2018–present	Incumbent
