= Dois Irmãos =

Municipality of Rio Grande do Sul, Brazil

- Municipality
- Municipality of Dois Irmãos
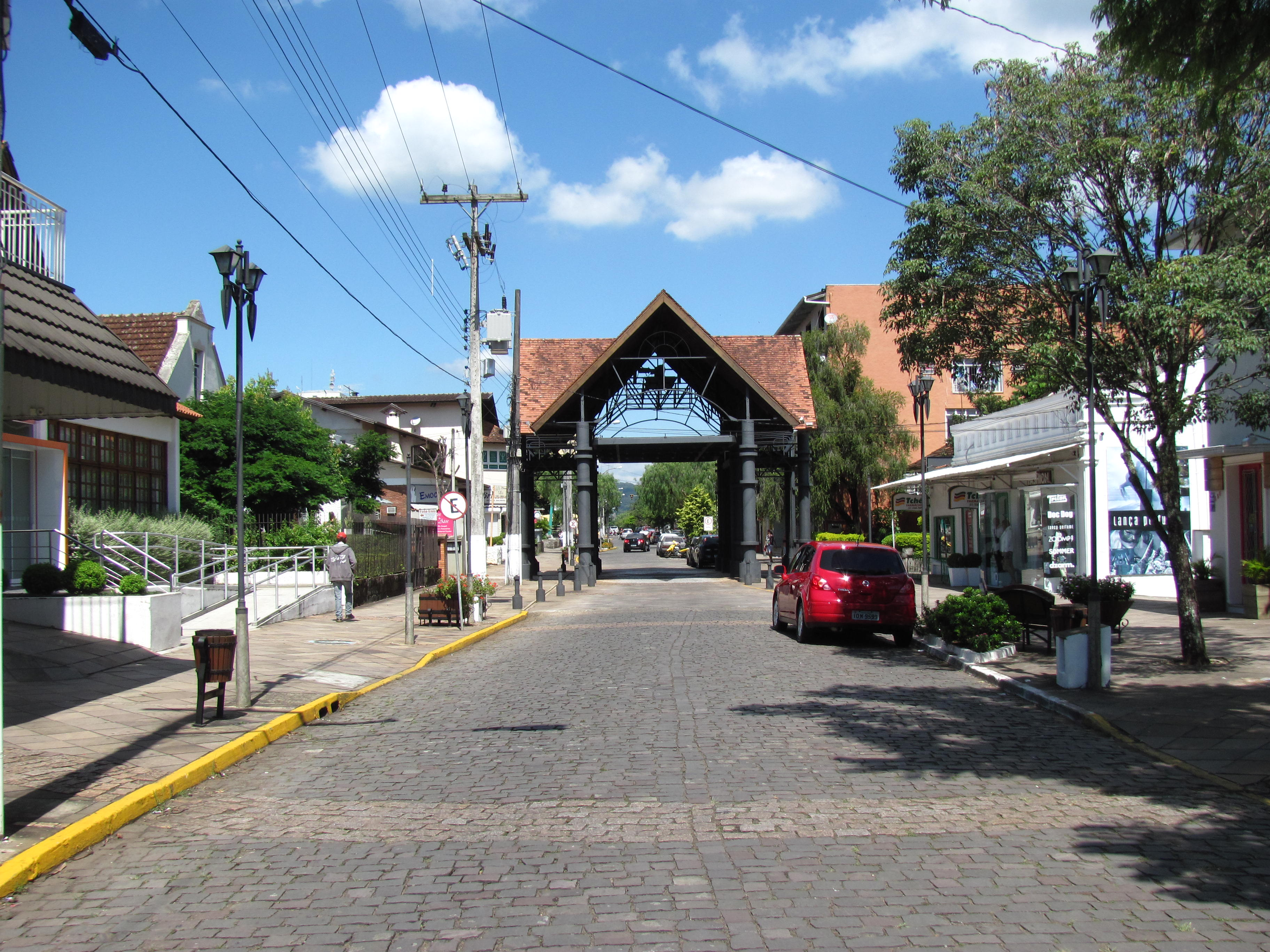
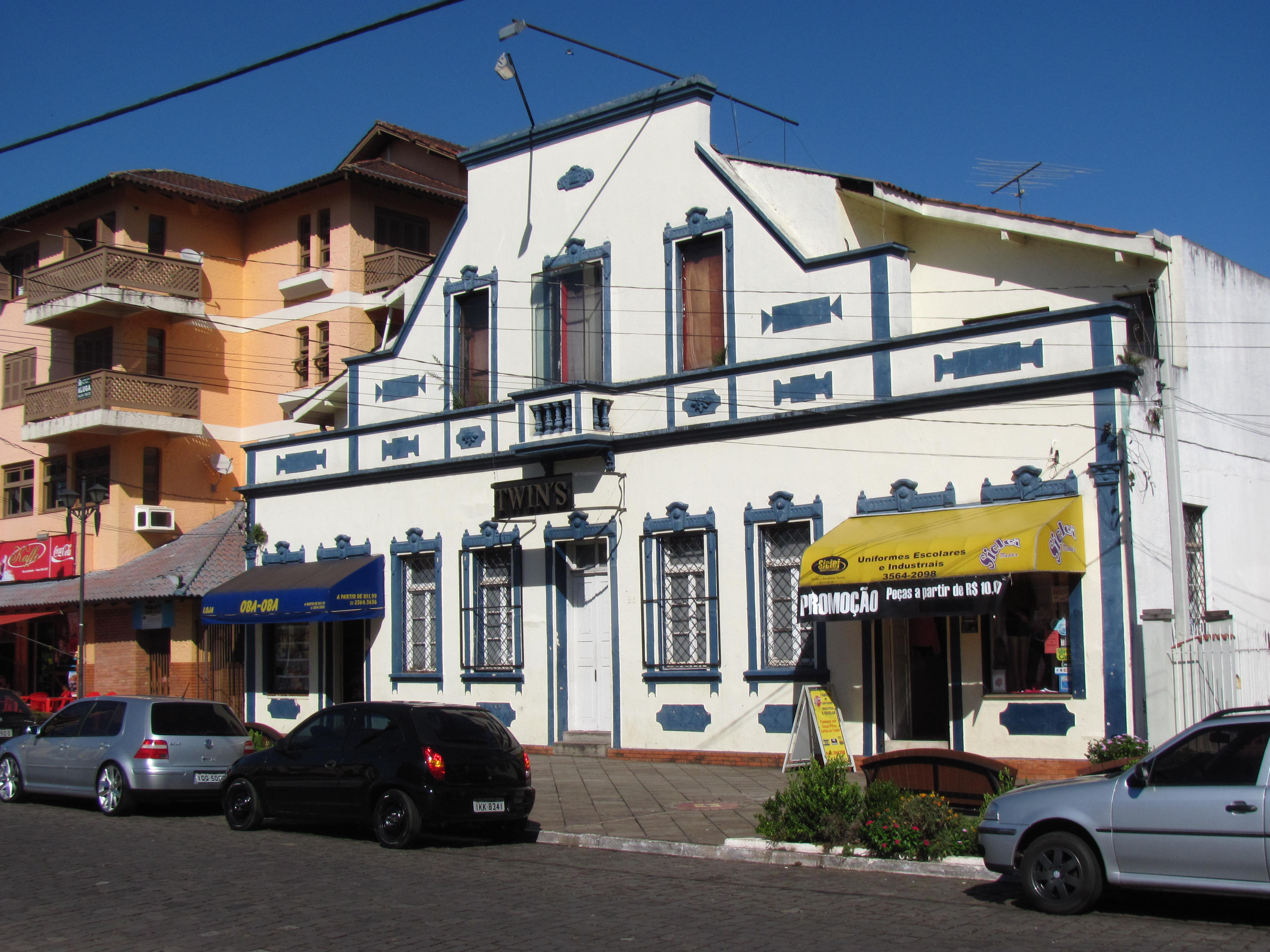
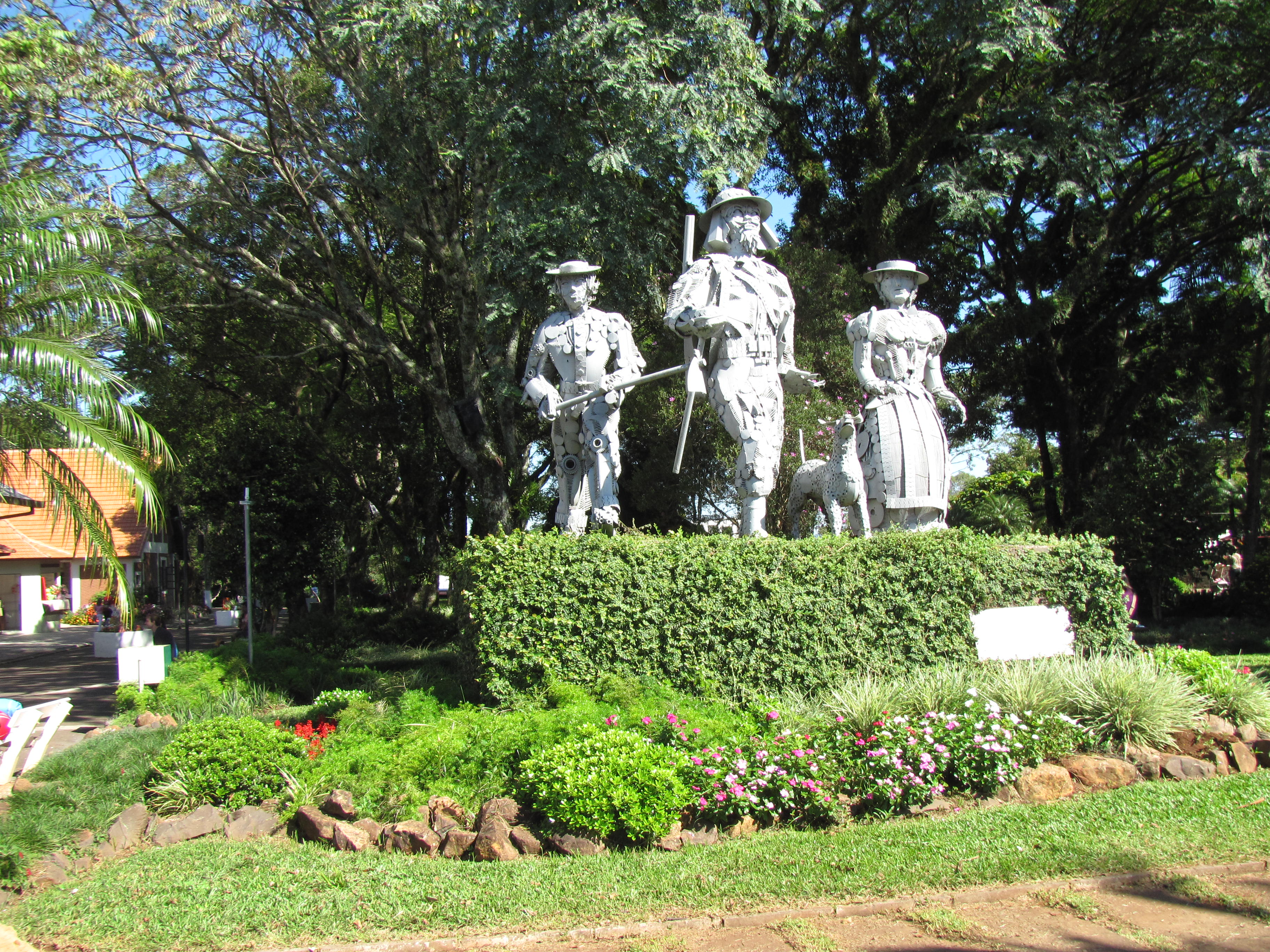
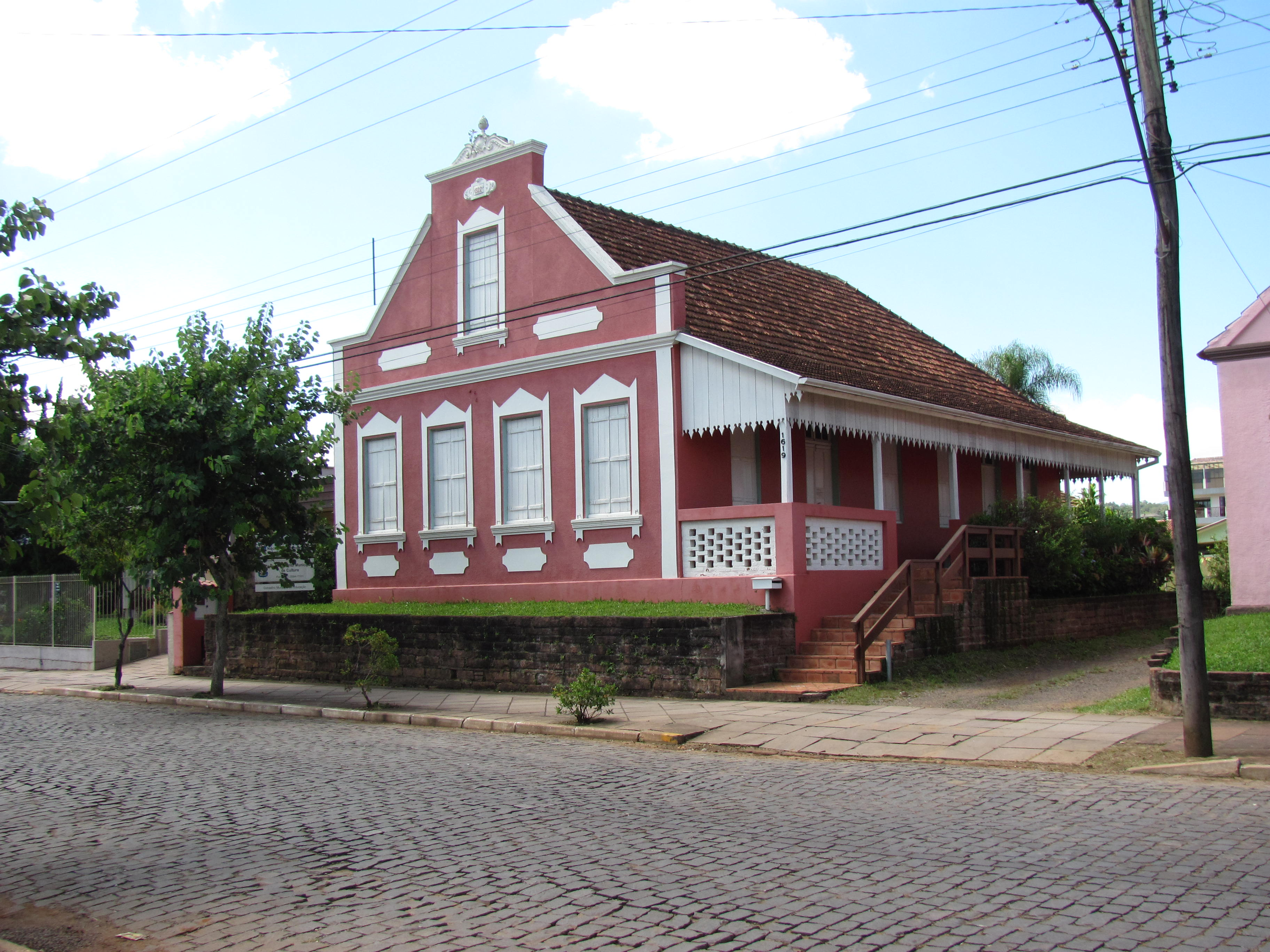
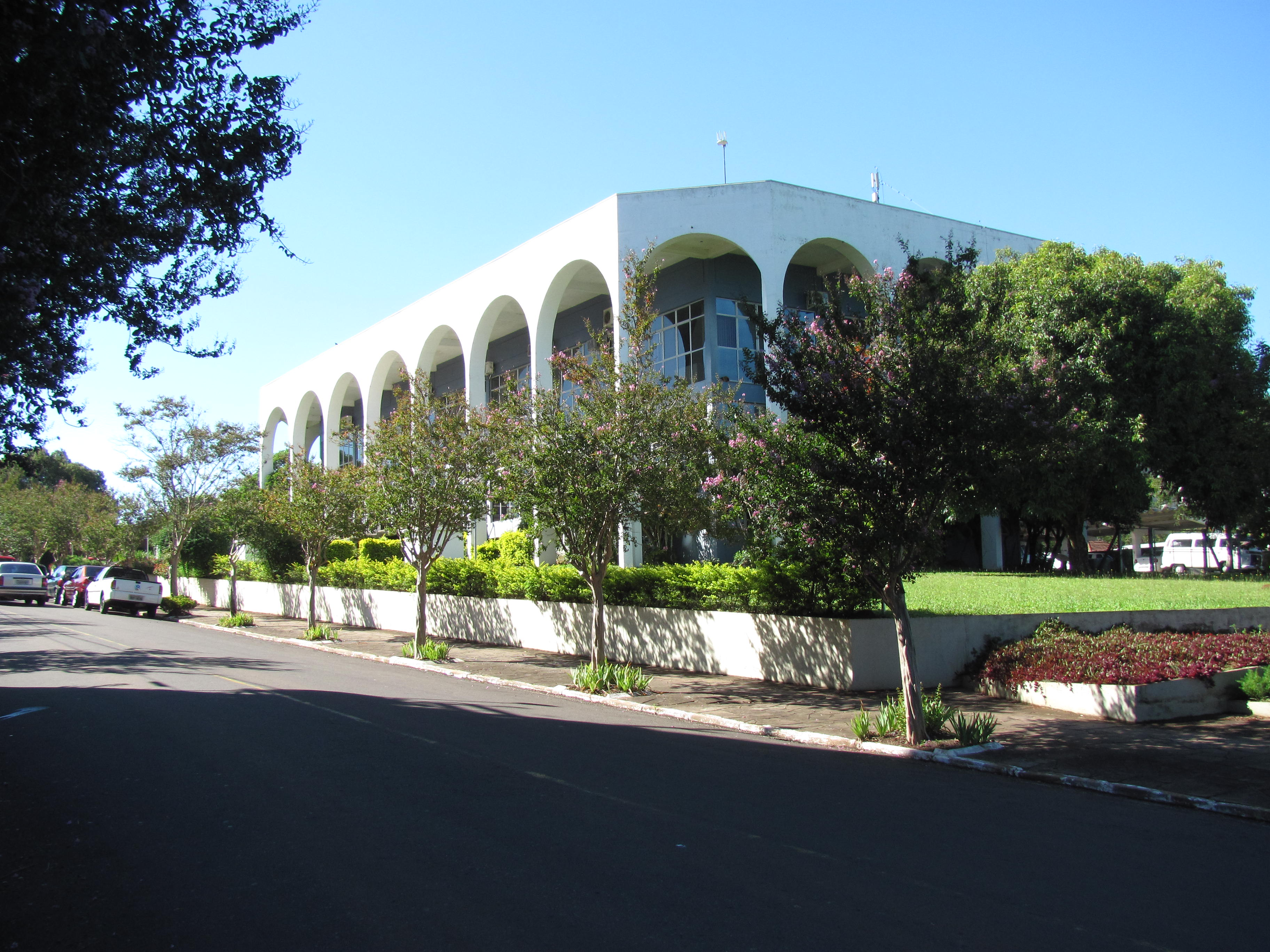
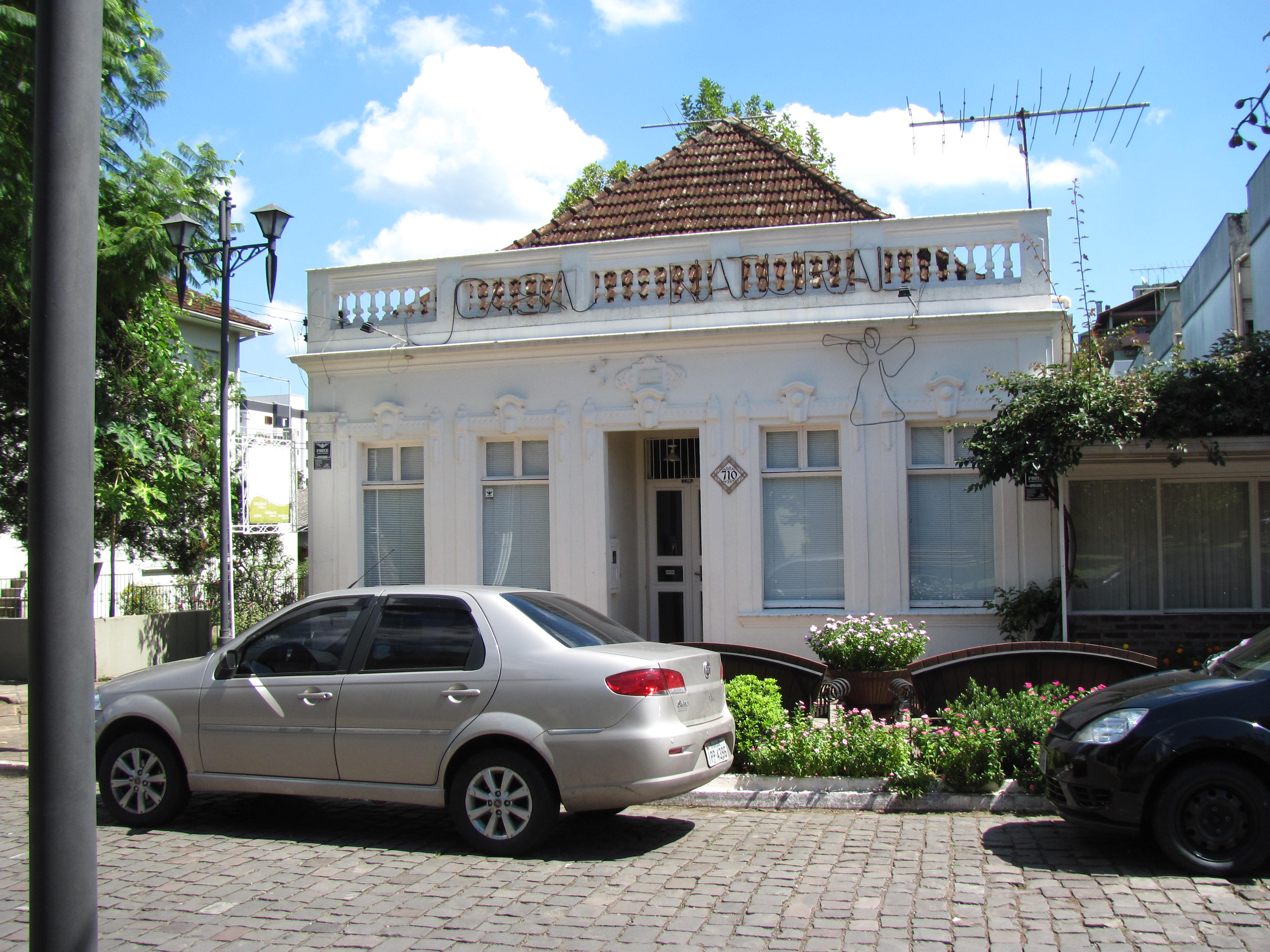

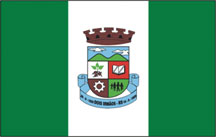
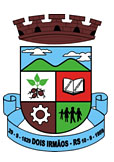
- Flag Coat of arms

- Location in Rio Grande do Sul
- Coordinates: 29°34′48″S 51°05′06″W
- Country: Brazil
- State: Rio Grande do Sul
- Founded: 29 September 1829

Government
  - Mayor: Jerri Adriani Meneghetti (PP)

Area
  - Total: 65.156 km^{2} (25.157 sq mi)

Population (2020)
  - Total: 33,119
  - Density: 508.30/km^{2} (1,316.5/sq mi)
- Time zone: UTC−3 (BRT)
- HDI (2010): 0.743 – high
- Website: doisirmaos.atende.net/cidadao

Dois Irmãos is a municipality in the state of Rio Grande do Sul, Brazil. Its original German name was Baumschneis. It is situated at 52 kilometers from Porto Alegre.

== Publishing ==
The Catholic subscription book club Minha Biblioteca Católica was created there.

== Economics ==
The municipality, part of the Vale dos Sinos region, stands out in the economic development of the Brazilian footwear industry, with several industries in this sector.

Production began with the arrival of German immigrants, who, in addition to being farmers, were dedicated to crafts.

== See also ==
- List of municipalities in Rio Grande do Sul
