= Communist Youth Union (Brazil) =

Brazilian politicial organization

Communist Youth Union União da Juventude Comunista
- Founded: August 1, 1927
- Ideology: Communism; Marxism-leninism
- Mother party: Brazilian Communist Party
- Website: ujc.org.br

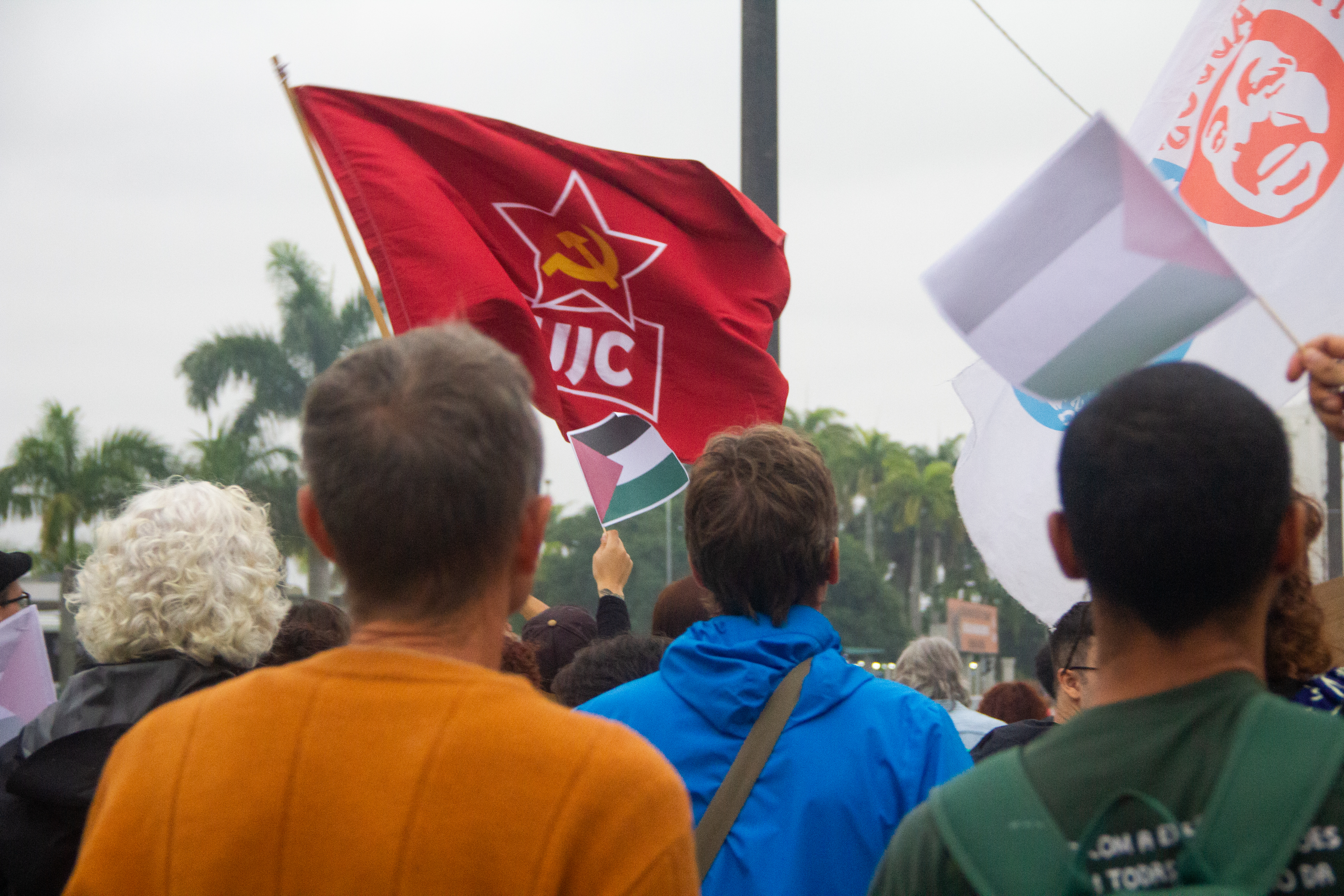
UJC at a pro-Palestine protest in Florianópolis.

The Communist Youth Union (in Portuguese: União da Juventude Comunista, UJC) is a Brazilian political organization officially founded in 1927, serving as the youth wing of the Brazilian Communist Party. Initially called the Communist Youth (Juventude Comunista), the UJC was the main youth organization responsible for the creation of the National Union of Students (UNE) in December 1938. The organization operates both within the student movement (currently part of the left-wing opposition within UNE) and among young workers, positioning itself against the policy of class collaboration. A member of the World Federation of Democratic Youth, the UJC defines itself as a school for cadres and for political training based theoretically on Marxism-Leninism.

== History ==
The Communist Youth Union (UJC) has its roots in the Communist Youth Federation of Brazil (FJCB), founded in 1927 as the youth wing of the Brazilian Communist Party (PCB), following guidelines from the Communist International. Born in a context of severe political repression, with the PCB often operating clandestinely, the organization began its work through cells in Rio de Janeiro, focused on agitation, propaganda, and recruitment. Although it involved students, such as Leôncio Basbaum, its primary emphasis was always on organizing and providing ideological training for young workers, serving as a crucial nursery for future party cadres.

During the 1930s, under the Vargas regime, the FJCB deepened its engagement in workers' and anti-fascist struggles. The organization was at the forefront of physical confrontations against Integralists, notably in the Battle of Praça da Sé in 1934, which resulted in deaths and injuries. This period was also marked by internal shadows, such as the controversial assassination of young militant Tobias Warchavski, allegedly ordered by the party's own leadership under accusations of treason—an episode that reveals the tensions and brutal methods of the time. Despite being officially dissolved by the PCB in 1937 for alleged sectarianism, the young communists, under new coordination, were instrumental in creating the National Union of Students (UNE) in 1938.

In 1947, the organization was refounded under the name Communist Youth Union (UJC), but the new illegality imposed by the Dutra government forced it back into clandestinity. In the following decades, the UJC was involved in nationalist campaigns, such as "O Petróleo é Nosso" ("The Oil is Ours"), and in protests against Brazil's alignment with the US in the Korean War. Schisms within the international communist movement, culminating in the foundation of the Communist Party of Brazil in 1962, also fragmented the UJC. With the 1964 military coup, the organization suffered intense persecution, with one-third of the PCB's Central Committee and many of its young militants being assassinated, yet it maintained a resilient presence in the student resistance.

With the amnesty and redemocratization, the UJC reemerged publicly in 1985. However, this rebirth coincided with a deep internal crisis within the PCB, aggravated by the dissolution of the Soviet Union. The ideological dispute culminated in the 1992 split and the foundation of the Popular Socialist Party (PPS), which took with it several young cadres. In response, sectors faithful to the Marxist-Leninist tradition convened an extraordinary congress in 1993 to rebuild the PCB and, consequently, reactivate the UJC as its tool for action among youth, reaffirming its role as a school for cadre formation.

Following its formal reorganization in 1993, the UJC began a process of rebuilding its militancy. A 2000 resolution allowed flexibility in its state-level structures while preparing for a national reorganization congress, realized in 2005. Since then, the UJC has intensified its intervention on multiple fronts: within the student movement, through groups like the Movement for a Popular University (MUP); in the cultural field, with state-level nuclei; and in organizing young workers. Theoretically self-defined by Marxism-Leninism and positioning itself against class collaboration, the UJC maintains its role as a relevant actor in left-wing social movements and is a member of the World Federation of Democratic Youth.

== Former militants ==
- Anita Leocádia Prestes
- Carlos Marighella
- David Capistrano da Costa Filho
- Guilherme Boulos
- João Saldanha
- Jones Manoel
- Leôncio Basbaum
- Sofia Manzano
- Zuleika Alambert
