= Palácio Rio Negro =

Country residence of the resident of Brazil

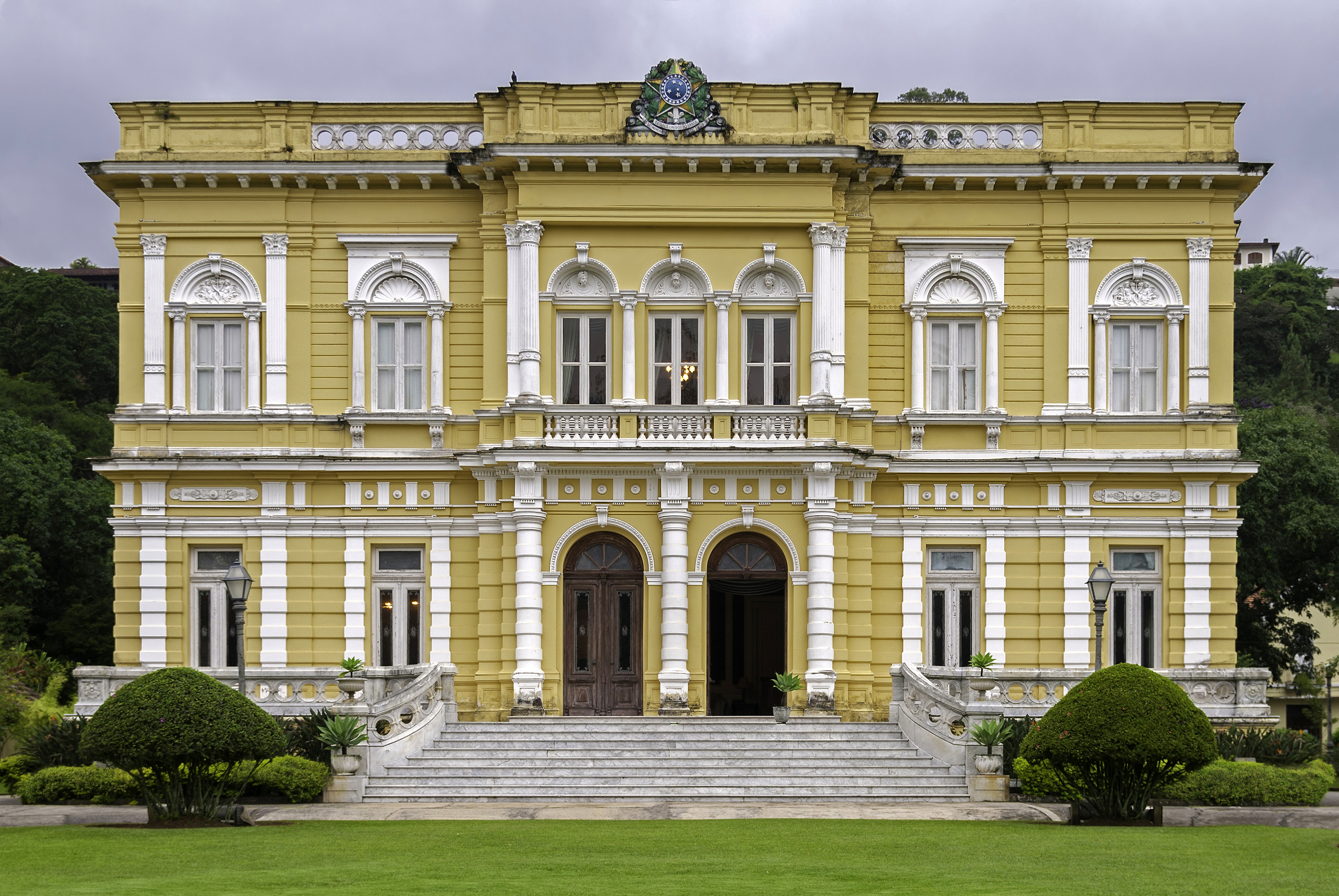
- Main façade of the palace
- Interactive map of the Palácio Rio Negro area

General information
- Location: Petrópolis, Brazil
- Coordinates: 22°30′31″S 43°10′52″W
- Construction started: 1889

The Palácio Rio Negro (English: Rio Negro Palace) is a palace located in Petrópolis, situated in a mountainous part of the state of Rio de Janeiro, Brazil. It is one of the official residences of the President of Brazil, used mainly as a country retreat.

== History ==
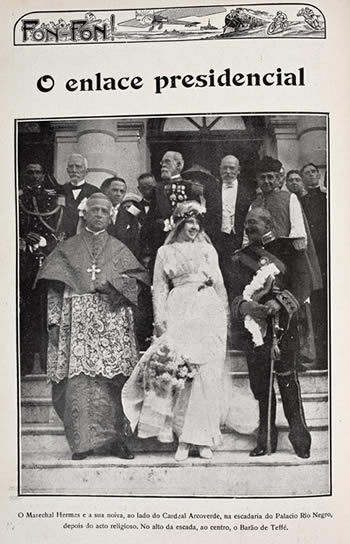
President Hermes da Fonseca (right) and First Lady Nair de Tefé, on the Rio Negro Palace's staircase, after their wedding (Fon Fon magazine), 1913

In 1889, three months prior to the Proclamation of the Republic, Manoel Gomes de Carvalho, the Baron of Rio Negro, purchased from the heirs of the Klippel family the lot where his summer residence would be built. He engaged Italian architect Antonio Jannuzzi, a friend of his, to design the palace and it was completed later in 1889. De Carvalho moved to Paris in 1894, leaving the building empty, and in February 1896, the Palace and adjacent buildings were sold to the State of Rio de Janeiro, to serve as the official residence of the state Governor.

In 1903, the Palace was incorporated to the Federal Government, and became the official summer residence of the Presidents of Brazil. Since then, sixteen Presidents have made use of the Rio Negro: Rodrigues Alves, Afonso Pena, Nilo Peçanha, Hermes da Fonseca, Wenceslau Brás, Epitácio Pessoa, Artur Bernardes, Washington Luiz, Getúlio Vargas, Gaspar Dutra, Café Filho, Juscelino Kubitschek, João Goulart, Costa e Silva, Fernando Henrique Cardoso, and most recently Luiz Inácio Lula da Silva.

It was during the administration of Hermes da Fonseca that the Palace hosted the wedding of the President and Nair de Tefé. Nair was known for the caricatures she published under the pseudonym of Rian.

President Getúlio Vargas was a frequent visitor. He stayed at the Palace every summer, during his 18 years in office.

The palace was more frequently used when the city of Rio de Janeiro was the Capital of Brazil. Since the transfer of the seat of Government to the newly founded Capital City of Brasília, in 1960, use of Rio Negro Palace declined sharply. The palace was not used at all in the 1970s and 1980s although President Fernando Henrique Cardoso resumed use of the palace for brief vacations in the 1990s. Today, Rio Negro Palace is rarely used.

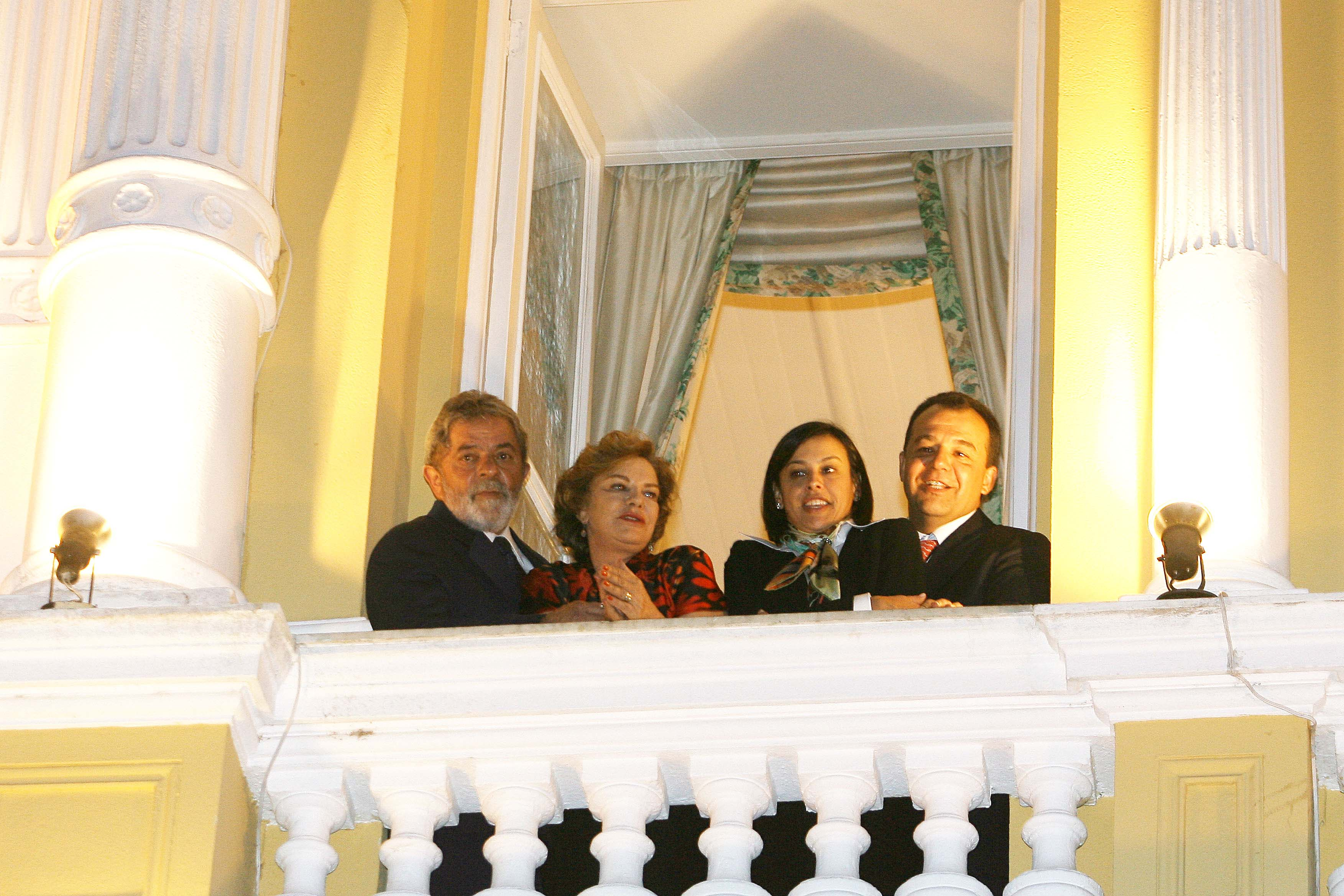
President Luiz Inácio Lula da Silva, First Lady Marisa Letícia, Governor of Rio de Janeiro Sérgio Cabral and wife Adriana on the balcony of the palace, 12 September 2008

== See also ==
- Palácio da Alvorada
- Granja do Torto
