= Edmilson Costa =

Brazilian economist, college professor and communist politician

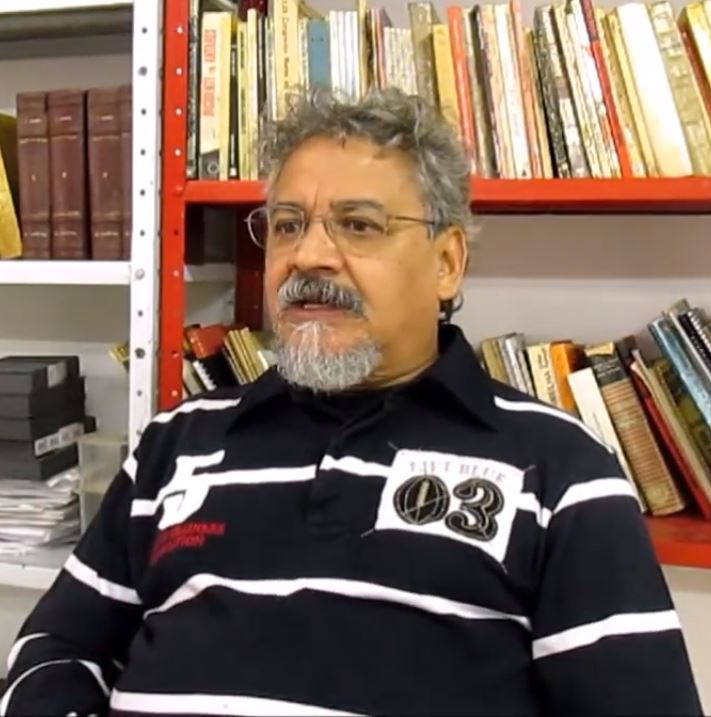

General Secretary of the Brazilian Communist Party
- Incumbent
- Assumed office 17 October 2016
- Preceded by: Ivan Pinheiro

Personal details
- Born: Edmilson Silva Costa; 8 April 1950 (age 76) Pedreiras, Maranhão, Brazil
- Party: PCB (1970–present)
- Education: Federal University of Maranhão (BSS)
- Profession: Economist

Edmilson Silva Costa (born 8 April 1950 in Pedreiras) is a Brazilian politician affiliated to the Brazilian Communist Party (PCB), serving as the party's General Secretary. He is a Doctor of Economics at the State University of Campinas.

== Biography ==
In 1992, after defending the thesis A Política Salarial no Brasil, 1964-1985: 21 anos de arrocho salarial e acumulação predatória (The Wage Policy in Brazil, 1964-1985: 21 years of wage squeeze and predatory accumulation), under the supervision of Waldir da Silva Quadros, professor of Economist at the State University of Campinas, he became Doctor of Economist at Unicamp.

He was a candidate for Mayor of São Paulo for the Communist Party in 2008.

On 26 April 2010, Costa was announced as candidate for Vice President of Brazil in the 2010 elections, along with then-General Secretary Ivan Pinheiro.

On 17 October 2016, he became General Secretary of the Brazilian Communist Party, replacing Ivan Pinheiro.

== Works ==
- Costa, Edmilson (1986). O que todo cidadão precisa saber sobre imperialismo [What every citizen needs to know about imperialism] (in Brazilian Portuguese). Global.
- Costa, Edmilson (1997). A polítical salarial no Brasil [The wage policy in Brazil] (in Brazilian Portuguese). Biotempo. ISBN 9788585934170.
- Costa, Edmilson (1998). Um projeto para o Brasil [A project for Brazil] (in Brazilian Portuguese). Tecno-Científica.
- Costa, Edmilson (2008). A globalização e o capitalismo contemporâneo [Globalization and contemporary capitalism] (in Brazilian Portuguese). Expressão Popular. ISBN 9788577430918.
- Costa, Edmilson (2013). A crise econômica mundial, a globalização e o Brasil [The world economic crisis, the globalization and Brazil] (in Brazilian Portuguese). Instituto Caio Prado Junior. ISBN 9788566538021.
- Costa, Edmilson (2020). Reflexões sobre a crise brasileira [Thoughts about the Brazilian crisis] (PDF) (in Brazilian Portuguese). Instituto Caio Prado Junior. ISBN 9786587543017.

Party political offices
Preceded by Ivan Pinheiro	General Secretary of the Brazilian Communist Party; 2016–present	Incumbent
Preceded by Sérgio Arouca	PCB nominee for Vice President of Brazil; 2010	Succeeded by Sofia Manzano
Preceded by Sofia Manzano	PCB nominee for President of Brazil; 2026	Most recent
