= Communist Youth Union (disambiguation) =

Communist Youth Union may refer to:

- Communist Youth Union, Czech Republic
- Communist Youth Union (Brazil)
- Communist Youth Union of Spain
- Dimitrov Communist Youth Union, Bulgaria
- Ho Chi Minh Communist Youth Union, Vietnam
- Jewish Communist Youth Union, Russia
- Russian Communist Union of Youth, also known as Komsomol
- Union of Communist Youth, Romania
