= Jones Manoel =

Brazilian activist and politician (born 1990)

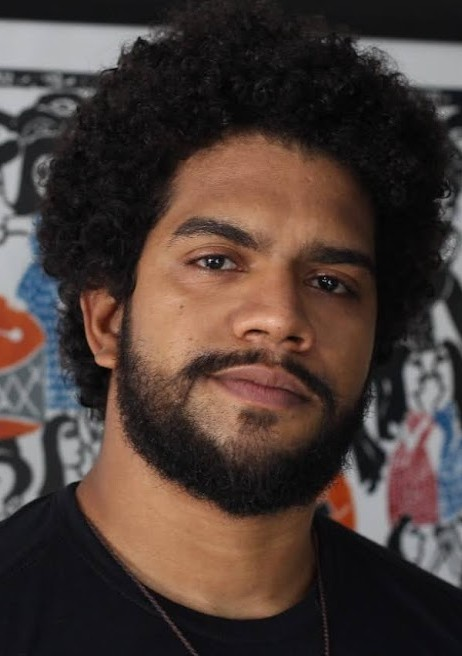
- Jones Manoel in 2022

Member-elect of the Chamber of Deputies
- Assuming office 1 February 2027
- Constituency: Pernambuco

Personal details
- Born: 9 January 1990 (age 36) Recife, Pernambuco, Brazil
- Party: PSOL (2026–present)
- Other political affiliations: PCB (2018–2023); Independent (2023–2026)
- Education: Federal University of Pernambuco
- Occupation: Historian, activist, YouTuber, teacher
- Website: jonesmanoel.com.br

YouTube information
- Channel: Farol Brasil
- Years active: 2017–present
- Genre: Politics
- Subscribers: 642,000
- Views: 75.3 million
- Last updated: March 2026

Jones Manoel da Silva (born 9 January 1990) is a Brazilian historian, YouTuber, history teacher, communicator, writer, activist, and politician. He is known for his self-titled YouTube channel. He holds a degree in history from the Federal University of Pernambuco (UFPE) and a master's degree in Social Work from the same university. Since 2024, he has been enrolled in the doctoral program in Social Work at the Federal University of Alagoas (UFAL).

Born and raised in the Borborema favela in Recife, he gained fame on the internet by speaking about Marxism and popular education. At the age of 14, he worked selling newspapers on the street. In 2011, at 21 years old, he began studying history at UFPE and simultaneously started his activism with the Brazilian Communist Party (PCB). He has written for Revista Opera, Blog da Boitempo, the PCB's newspaper O Poder Popular, as well as his own website, for Lavrapalavra, and participates in the Revolushow podcast. He debuted his video column on the CartaCapital channel on August 5, 2020.

During the 2022 elections, he was a candidate for governor of Pernambuco for the PCB, finishing in 6th place in the race with 33,931 votes.

In the 2026 general elections, he was elected Federal Deputy for Pernambuco representing the Socialism and Liberty Party (PSOL), securing 249,077 votes (4.73% of the valid votes), being the second most voted in the state for that position.

== Biography ==
=== Early Life (1990–2013) ===
Jones Manoel is the son of Elza Antônia da Silva, a woman who began working at the age of 8 and, at 15, migrated to Recife to work as a domestic servant, and Luis Manoel, who was born and raised in the Borborema favela in Recife. When Jones was 11 years old, his father was murdered in a crime that remains unsolved to this day. He grew up with his mother and his older sister, Juliana. His political awakening began through rap, with artists such as Racionais MC's, Facção Central, GOG, Tupac Shakur, and RZO. He also grew up listening to forró through bands like Cavaleiros do Forró, Calcinha Preta, and Saia Rodada.

The first time he heard about Marxism was in a Tupac song that mentioned Fidel Castro, and in the Racionais MC's' song "Jesus Chorou," which references: "Malcolm X, Gandhi, Lennon, Marvin Gaye, Che Guevara, Tupac and Bob Marley and the evangelical Martin Luther King." It was a collection of names he was unfamiliar with. His first curiosity about who Malcolm X was came after hearing GOG's song, "Malcolm X foi a Meca...GOG ao Nordeste."

At the age of 20, through a friend, he encountered Marxism and began gaining access to leftist literature. By 21, he already identified as a communist. His first two experiences with activism were running for president of his community's residents' association—though he had to withdraw due to threats and intimidation—and later, together with his friend Júlio César, establishing a popular course called Novo Caminho ("New Path"). The course ran for two years and helped over 20 young people from Borborema and the surrounding area gain access to public educational institutions. Jones was one of the first young people in the history of Borborema to enter a public university, enrolling in the history program at UFPE in 2011.

=== Political activism (2013–Present) ===
In 2013, after participating in the June Journeys protests, Jones Manoel began his activism with the Communist Youth Union, the youth wing of the Brazilian Communist Party (PCB). He remained active in the student movement in the following years. After completing his undergraduate degree, he pursued a master's in Social Work at UFPE, shifting his focus to communication and popular education. He maintained a successful blog for years and later started a YouTube channel in 2017, produced podcasts, and wrote for various media outlets and popular education initiatives. He also worked in the trade union movement and briefly taught at a public military school in Bahia. His YouTube channel gained significant traction only after the 2018 presidential elections. In 2019, he published the anthology Revolução Africana (African Revolution), which sold around 9,000 copies by October 2020. The success of his book and channel led him to leave his tenured teaching position to focus on selling books and online courses. Although the PCB considered him as a candidate for Recife city councilor in 2020, this did not materialize.

He continued his activism within the PCB, focusing on popularizing Marxism and the "Brazilian Revolution" program. He maintained his YouTube channel, participated in the Revolushow podcast, co-directed the Quebrando as Correntes (Breaking the Chains) book collection, and taught a course on anti-colonial Marxism. On January 6, 2020, an interview he conducted with Caetano Veloso was published, in which Veloso later credited Jones Manoel's videos and the works of Domenico Losurdo for shifting him away from liberal views. In December 2020, a government report labeled Jones a "detractor" for his criticism of the Bolsonaro administration and recommended monitoring his publications. In July 2021, he faced a racist attack from then-Secretary of Culture Mário Frias on Twitter, which was removed by the platform, and received widespread support from public figures in response. Jones has frequently been accused by both right-wing and left-wing critics of being a Stalinist and of denying or downplaying the crimes of the Soviet Union under Joseph Stalin, although Jones stated that he was not a Stalinist when inquired on the matter.

In December 2021, the PCB announced Jones Manoel as its pre-candidate for Governor of Pernambuco in the 2022 elections. In October 2022, running with vice-governor candidate Raline Almeida, he finished in 6th place, receiving 33,931 votes (0.69% of the electorate). In July 2023, he was expelled from the PCB by the majority of its Central Committee along with four other members. Following his expulsion, Jones and other excluded members organized an event in June 2024 called the "XVII (Extraordinary) Congress of the Brazilian Communist Party - Revolutionary Reconstruction." This led to the formation of a political collective named the "Revolutionary Brazilian Communist Party," which is distinct from the historical guerrilla group PCBR and aims to participate in Brazil's institutional politics.

==== Accounts removed by Meta ====
On August 7, 2025, Jones's Facebook and Instagram accounts were taken down by Meta, the owner of these social networks, without prior warning or a specified reason for the decision. On Instagram, Jones had over 1 million followers when his account was taken offline by Meta. Jones suspected that the deactivation of his profiles was politically motivated, due to his communist activism and criticisms of the Donald Trump administration and big tech companies. The accounts were restored by Meta on August 8, without the company explaining the reasons for its actions.

==== Neo-Nazi threats ====
On August 21, 2025, two weeks after the incident with Meta, Jones received death threats sent by a Brazilian neo-Nazi organization via email. The threats contained hate speech, racial slurs, the disclosure of personal, financial, and geolocation data, as well as a demand for payment. The YouTuber's legal team was activated and, through a statement, informed that the email was signed by the "Brigada Hitlerista Brasileira (Atomwaffen Brasil)", an international neo-Nazi and terrorist organization founded in 2015. On October 18, 2025, the influencer reported receiving new threats from the same neo-Nazi organization. The message claimed the organization could not be captured by the police due to its alleged influence and threatened to assassinate Jones Manoel if he did not deposit R$250,000 to its members. The communicator received support from the Ministry of Human Rights and Citizenship and maintained his scheduled agenda, while adopting new security measures.

=== Electoral history ===
Year	Election	Party	Office	Coalition	Partners	Party	Votes	Percent	Result
2022	State Elections of Pernambuco	PCB	Governor	—N/a	Raline Almeida	PCB	33,931	0.69%	Not elected
2026	State Elections of Pernambuco	PSOL	Federal Deputy	—N/a			249,077	4.73%	Elected

== Works ==
- Manoel, Jones; Fazzio, Gabriel (2019). Revolução Africana: uma antologia do pensamento marxista. Brasil: Autonomia Literária. ISBN 978-85-69536-56-7.
- Manoel, Jones; Landi, Gabriel (2020). Raça, classe e revolução: a luta pelo poder popular nos Estados Unidos. Brasil: Autonomia Literária. ISBN 978-65-87233-19-2.
- Losurdo, Domenico; Manoel, Jones (2020). Colonialismo e luta anticolonial: desafios da revolução no século XXI. Brasil: Boitempo Editorial. ISBN 9786557170090.
- Landi, Gabriel; Manoel, Jones (2021). A outra Rosa: estratégia e política revolucionária XXI. Brasil: LavraPalavra. ISBN 9786587311111.
- Dunker, Christian; Maia, Heribaldo; Manoel, Jones (2022). Marxismo, psicanálise, revolução. Brasil: LavraPalavra. ISBN 978-6587311326.
- Manoel, Jones (2023). "Junho de 2013 e a guerra híbrida: o leninismo contra a idealização da conspiração". Junho de 2013: a rebelião fantasma. Brasil: Boitempo Editorial. ISBN 9786557172353.
- Manoel, Jones; Landi, Gabriel (2023). Pátria socialista ou morte: marxismo latino-americano e caribenho. Brasil: Autonomia Literária. ISBN 978-85-69536-94-9.
- Manoel, Jones (2024). A negação do Brasil negro: imperialismo, dependência e questão racial na obra de Guerreiro Ramos. Brasil: Autonomia Literária. ISBN 978-65-5497-042-6.
- Maia, Heribaldo; Manoel, Jones (2024). Cinismo e a Morte da Esquerda Brasileira. Brasil: Ruptura Editorial. ISBN 9786598180560.

== Bibliography ==
- Veras, Luciana (1 June 2021). ""Nunca me adaptei aos estereótipos de um intelectual"". Continente. Archived from the original on 2 June 2021.
