= Brazilian Communist Party (disambiguation) =

Brazilian Communist Party may refer to:

- Brazilian Communist Party (1922), the historical PCB, founded in 1922 and dissolved in 1992 (original acronym: PCB)
- Brazilian Communist Party, the current PCB, re-registered in 1996 (acronym: PCB)
- Communist Party of Brazil, the PCdoB, founded in 1962 as a dissidence of the historical PCB (acronym: PCdoB)
