= Palácio da Alvorada =

Official residence of the President of Brazil

Alvorada Palace
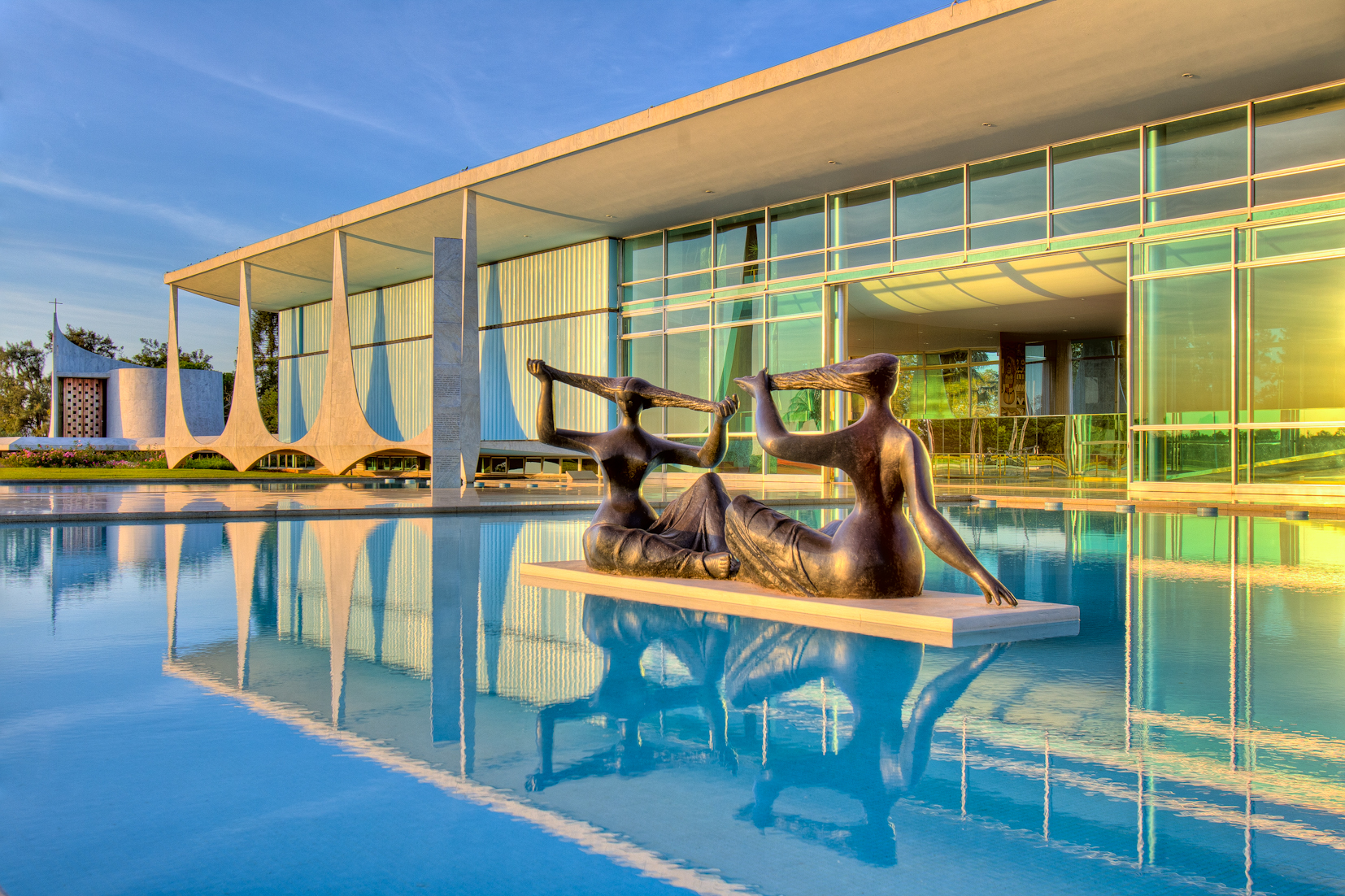
- Main façade of the palace

- Location within Brasília

General information
- Architectural style: Modernist
- Location: Brasília, DF, Via Presidencial, Zona Cívico-Administrativa – CEP 70150-000, Brazil
- Coordinates: 15°47′33.98″S 47°49′19.83″W
- Elevation: 1,172 m (3,845 ft)
- Current tenants: Luiz Inácio Lula da Silva, President of Brazil
- Construction started: 3 April 1957
- Inaugurated: 30 June 1958
- Renovated: 16 November 2005
- Client: President Juscelino Kubitschek
- Owner: Federal government of Brazil

Height
- Height: 32.82 ft (10.00 m)

Technical details
- Floor count: 2 (above ground); 1 (below ground)
- Floor area: 7,300 m^{2} (79,000 ft^{2})

Design and construction
- Architect: Oscar Niemeyer

Website
- gov.br/planalto

National Historic Heritage of Brazil

The Palácio da Alvorada (Portuguese pronunciation: [paˈlasju dawvoˈɾadɐ]) is the official residence of the president of Brazil. It is located in the national capital of Brasília, on a peninsula at the margins of Paranoá Lake. The building was designed by Oscar Niemeyer and built between 1957 and 1958 in the modernist style. It has been the residence of every Brazilian president since Juscelino Kubitschek. The building is listed as a National Historic Heritage Site.

The Palácio da Alvorada is used as a residence and for official receptions. The president's workplace and center of the executive branch is the Palácio do Planalto.

== Naming conventions ==
The building was initially referred to as the "Presidential Palace". The name "Palácio da Alvorada" ("Palace of Dawn") comes from a quote by Juscelino Kubitschek: "Que é Brasília, senão a alvorada de um novo dia para o Brasil?" ("What is Brasília, if not the dawn of a new day for Brazil?").

== History ==
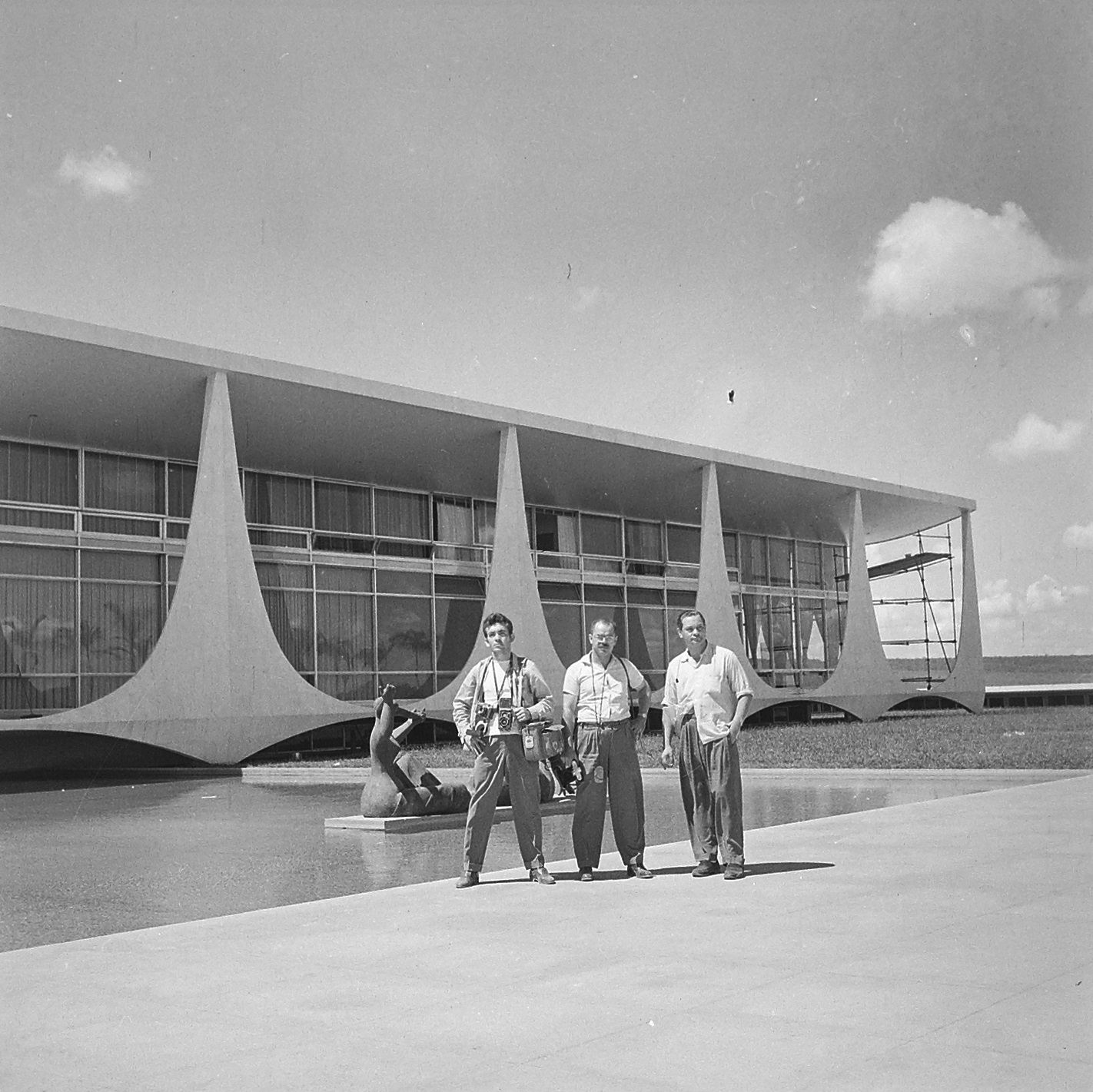
The Palácio da Alvorada under construction between 1957 and 1958

The Palácio da Alvorada was the first government structure built in the new federal capital. Construction began on April 3, 1957, and was completed on June 30, 1958. Niemeyer's project was based on the principles of simplicity and modernity.

=== In the 21st century ===
In 2004, First Lady Marisa Letícia directed the most extensive and historical restoration of the palace in its history. The project took two years to complete at a cost of $18.4 million dollars. Research was conducted to restore the rooms and décor to their original styles. Furniture and decoration objects were also restored. The electric and central air conditioning systems were replaced, and floor and ceiling work was done. Contrary to popular belief, the restoration was not paid by the government, but was part of an ongoing project of restoration of heritage sites under the direction of the National Institute of Historic and Artistic Heritage with funds donated by private corporations (for tax-deduction).

In January 2023, it was widely reported that Jair Bolsonaro, who lived in the building during his term as 38th President of Brazil, had "wrecked" the palace, leaving torn carpets and sofas, leaking ceilings, and broken windows and floorboards. A tapestry by Emiliano Di Cavalcanti had reportedly been moved from the library and hung into the sun, necessitating restoration work, and some artworks had disappeared entirely. A Brazilian cactus planted by Bolsonaro's predecessor and successor, Luiz Inácio Lula da Silva, had been removed, and a ballpoint pen – which Bolsonaro had used as a symbol of his administration – had been left on the desk.

== Architecture ==
The building has an area of 7,000 square metres (75,000 ft^{2}) distributed along three floors: basement, landing and second floor. Located in adjacent buildings within palace grounds are the chapel and the heliport. The basement level houses the movie theater, game room, kitchen, laundry, medical center, and the building's administration.

=== Ground floor ===
The ground floor houses the state rooms used by the presidency for official receptions. It is made up of the Entrance Hall, Waiting Room, State Room, Library, Mezzanine, Dining Room, Noble Room, Music Room and Banquet Room.

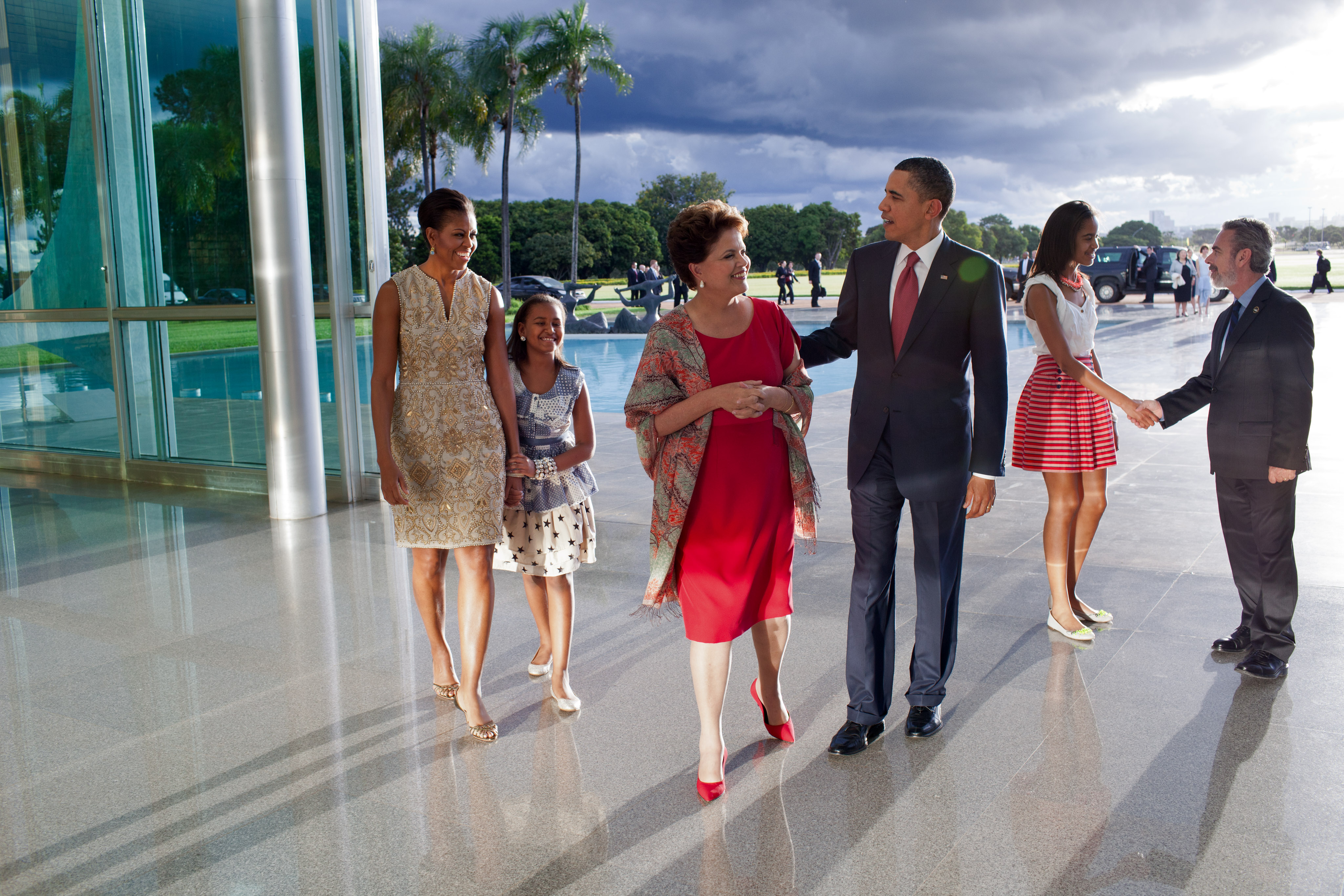
President Dilma Rousseff with U.S. President Barack Obama and his family in the Entrance Hall, 19 March 2011

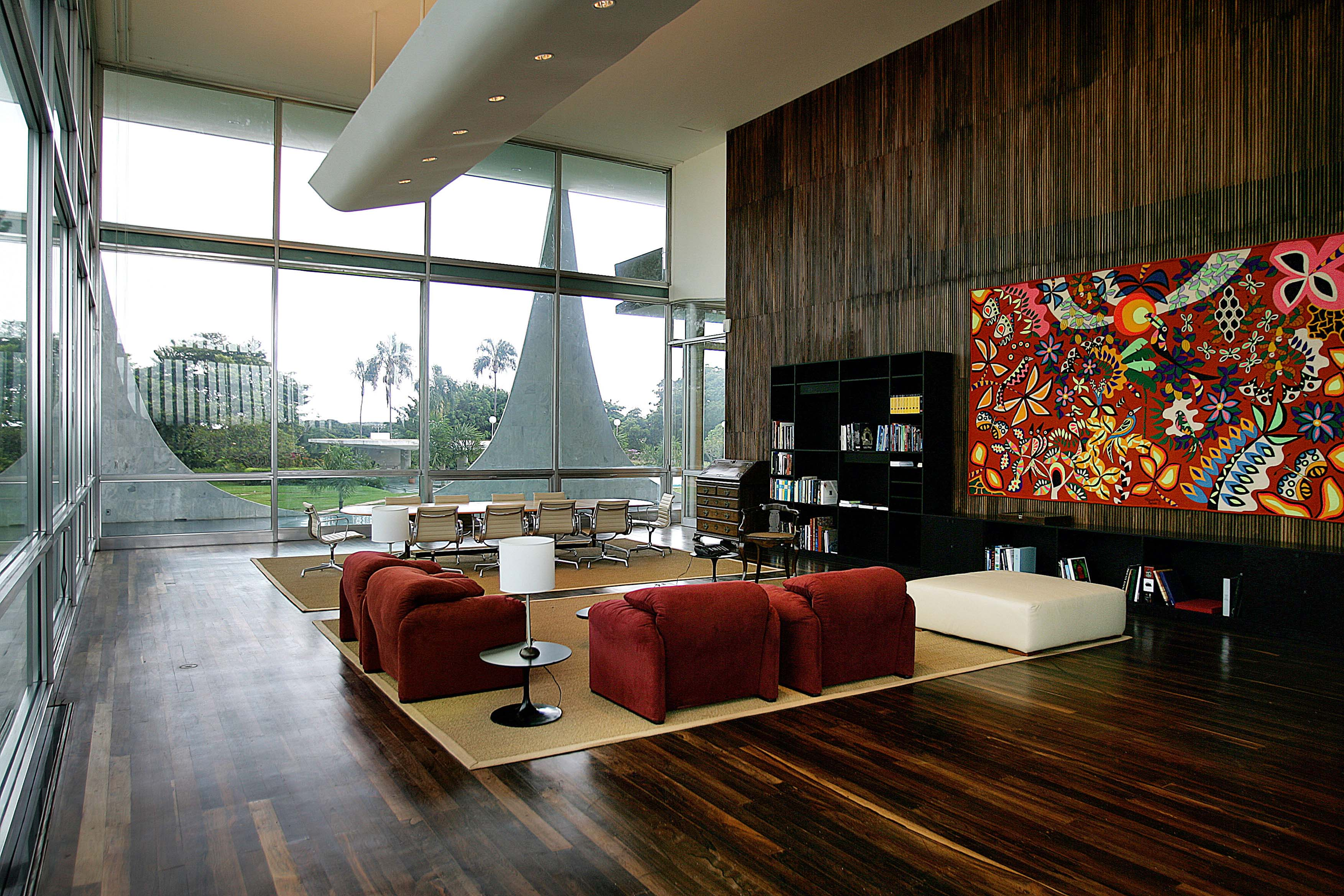
A view inside the State Room

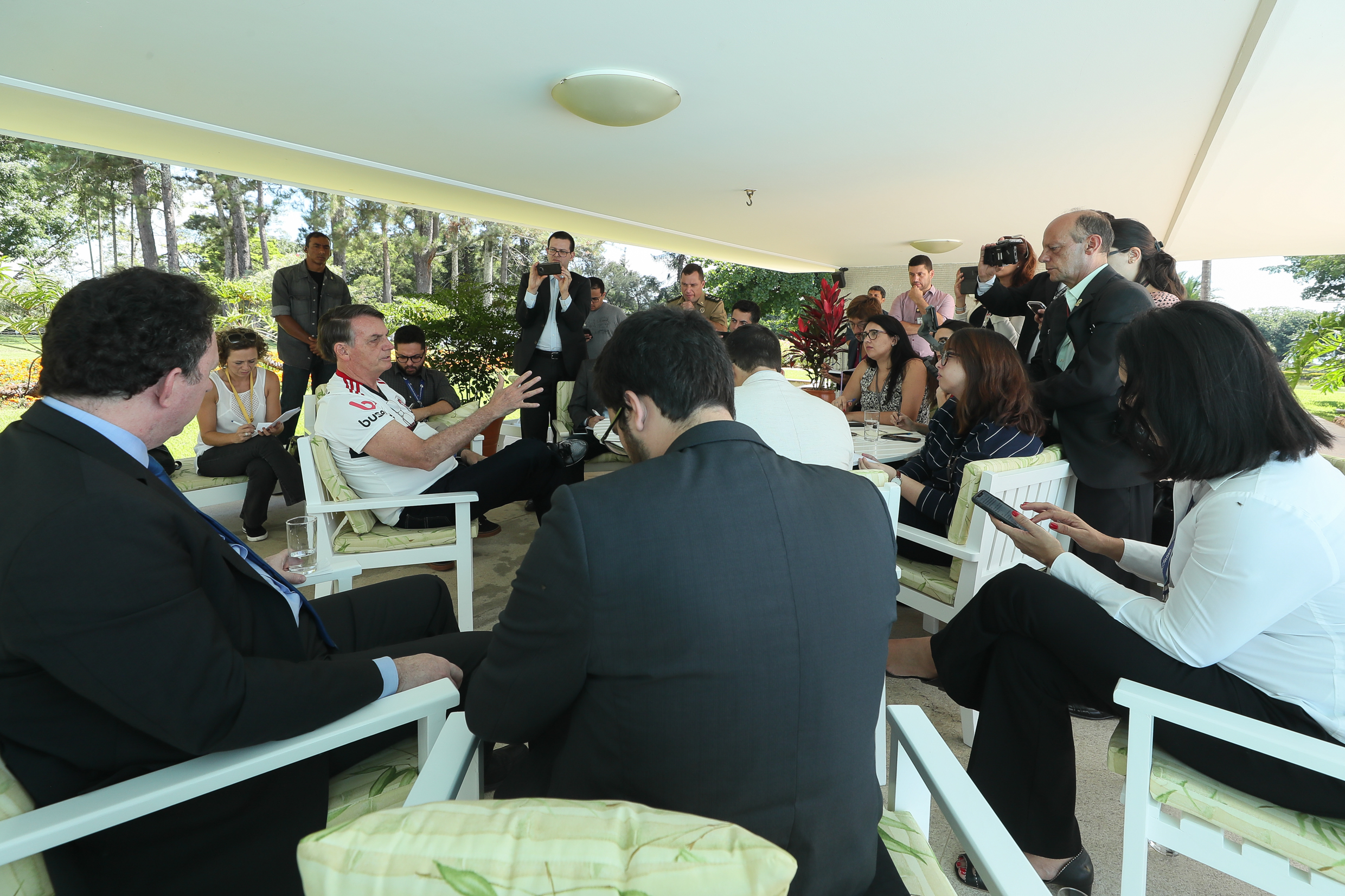
President Jair Bolsonaro during a press conference in 2019

The Entrance Hall is the main entrance area of the palace. Its main feature is a golden wall inscribed with a phrase by president Kubitschek: "From this central plateau, this vast emptiness that will soon become the center of national decisions, I look once more at the future of my country and foresee this dawn with an unshakeable faith in its great destiny - Juscelino Kubitschek, October 2, 1956".

The Waiting Room is decorated with a tapestry made by Concessa Colaço entitled Manhã de Cores; two paintings by Vicente do Rego Monteiro – Abstração and Céu; and a work of art from Carlos Scliar entitled Os Barcos Esperam.

The State Room is furnished with a mixture of contemporary and antique items. The main wall is made of jacarandá-da-baía. Two sacred images stand out, Saint Mary Magdalene and Saint Teresa of Ávila, both from the 18th century Baroque style. Kennedy Bahia’s tapestry, entitled Flora e Fauna da Bahia, stands out on the wall, as well as paintings made by Djanira da Motta e Silva entitled Colhendo Café; by Maria Leontina, entitled Cena II; and by Alfredo Volpi entitled Fachada em Oval.

The Library's book collection includes 3406 literary works that range from arts, philosophy, politics and literature to general history and Brazilian history, among others. The library is decorated with a tapestry by Emiliano Di Cavalcanti – Músicos – and three framed old maps: South America (1645), Brazil (undated) and Captaincies of Brazil (1656). There are also two small oil paintings, Moça Sentada ao Piano (1857) and Senhora Sentada (1885), by Rodolfo Amoedo.

The Mezzanine is a circulation area between the Entrance Hall, the Library and the Noble Room. It features a tapestry by Di Cavalcanti entitled Múmias, three indigenous funerary urns from Marajó Island, and two sculptures by Alfredo Ceschiatti.

The Dining Room was added in 1992, and is decorated with a table and twelve English chairs in Chippendale style and two other Brazilian tables from the 18th century. Seventeenth-century Flemish paintings by Cornelis de Heem and Jan van Huysum stand out in the room. Besides these works of art, the room is also decorated with two Baroque-style angels from the state of Minas Gerais, and a set of porcelain from the East India Company dating back to the 18th century.

The Noble Room is divided into four sections in which stand out two Victor Brecheret sculptures, entitled Morena and Saindo do Banho. The contemporary section is decorated with Mies van der Rohe’s furniture. The last two sections display a mixture of antique and contemporary Brazilian and foreign furniture. Two torch holders in golden wood and two sacred pieces are among them – The Holy Family and Sant’Ana Maestra – sitting on an 18th-century table. On the wall, an Aldemir Martins painting entitled Vaqueiro and two works of art made by Candido Portinari – Jangadas do Nordeste and Os Seringueiros stand out.

The Music Room is located between the Noble Room and the Banquet Room. It features two upholstered sets of sofas separated by a German parlor grand piano. In the back, on a wood dresser stand the statues of Saint John the Evangelist (17th century), Saint Joachim (18th century).

The Banquet Room was designed by Anna Maria Niemeyer, and features a large dining table with fifty seats. In the back of the room there is a 19th-century cedar dresser, next to two chests dated from the beginning of the 20th century. It is decorated by two tapestries entitled Saudades do Meu Jardim, from Concessa Colaço, a sculpture Edificação, by André Bloc, and silverware from the Catete Palace.

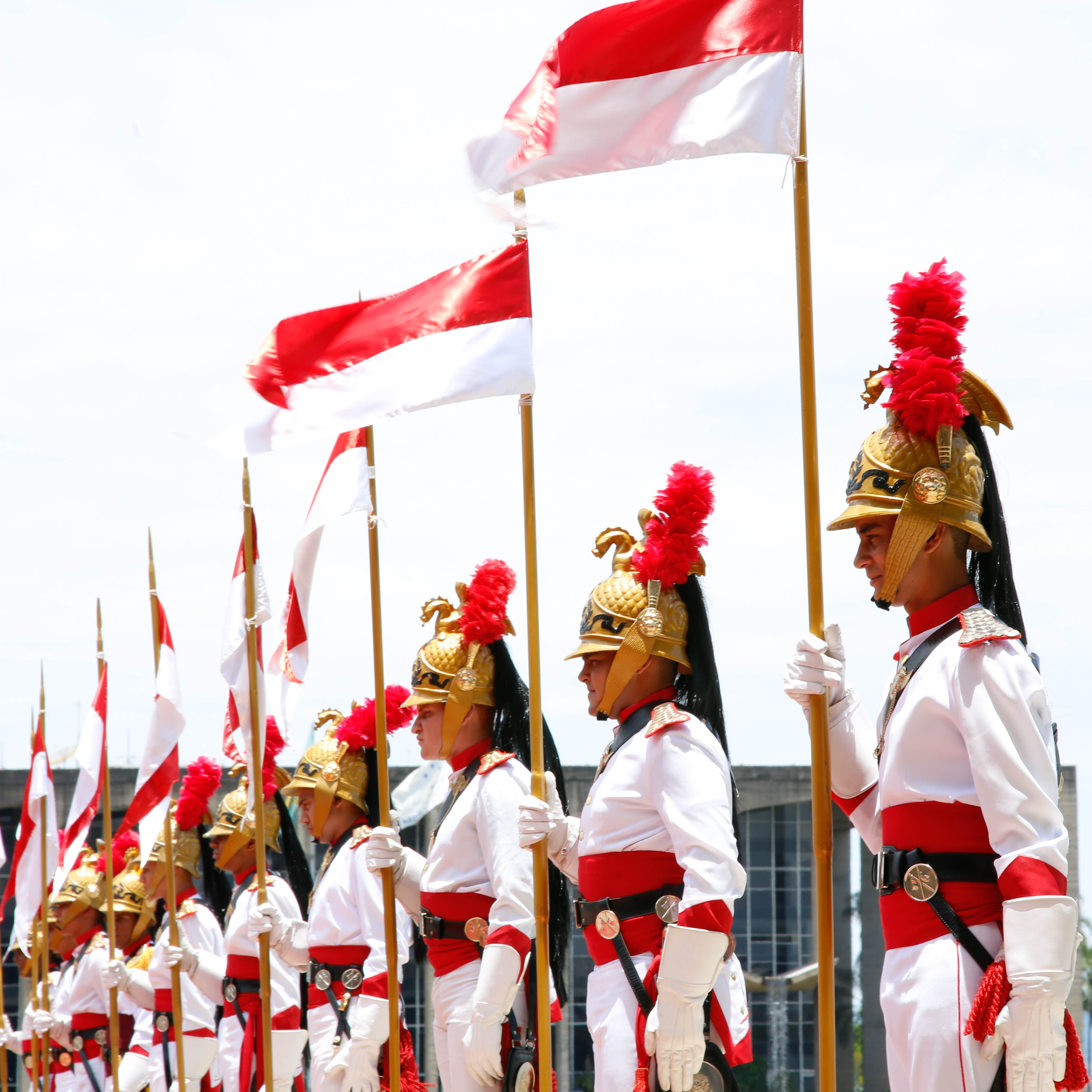
The Presidential Guard Battalion

=== Second floor ===
The second floor is the residential part of the palace, with the presidential apartment consisting of four suites, two guest apartments and other private rooms.

== Staff and security ==
There are 160 employees currently working at the palace, including secretaries, assistants, waiters, cooks, doctors and security personnel. The palace complex is protected by the Presidential Guard Battalion.

== See also ==
- Planalto Palace
- Granja do Torto
- Rio Negro Palace
- Catete Palace
- Paço Imperial
- Palace of São Cristóvão
- Petrópolis Imperial Palace
- List of Oscar Niemeyer works
