= Zuleika Alambert =

Brazilian writer, feminist, and politician

Personal details
- Born: 23 December 1922 Santos, Brazil
- Died: 27 December 2012 (aged 90) Rio de Janeiro, Brazil

Zuleika Alambert (23 December 1922, in Santos – 27 December 2012, in Rio de Janeiro) was a Brazilian writer, feminist, and politician. She was elected a State Representative for the city of Santos in 1947 by the Brazilian Communist Party, becoming one of the first women to hold a seat in the Legislative Assembly of São Paulo. She was the author of several books, including: "Uma jovem brasileira na URSS" (1953), "Estudantes fazem história" (1964), "Feminismo: O Ponto de Vista Marxista" (1986), and others. Alambert was also a feminist leader who fought for social rights in Brazil. She died on December 27, 2012, in Rio de Janeiro.

== Early political career and feminist work ==
The PCB logo

Zuleika Alambert was the leading female communist in São Paulo and served as a member in the PCB Central Committee. In 1947, Alambert was elected to the Legislative Assembly of São Paulo. She is categorized as a working-class Left woman. When she was the Communist Deputy in 1947, she expressed her conviction that women were no longer living "exclusively for their home and children without directly participating in political, social, and economic life." In her inauguration speech, she explained how groups like the União de Mulheres Democráticas, set up in cities within São Paulo like Santo André, were set up in order to "develop a peaceful but intransigent fight to conquer women's rights in all sectors of human life." She emphasized the desire to achieve equal pay for equal work and end carestia which was a long famine. She spoke out about how women and men worked in cooperative terms, and that there was a sort of interdependence between men and women in the workplace. Alambert was able to empower women through her rhetoric and political career.

Zuleika Alambert had been a member of the Brazilian Communist Party, however she left the party in order to pursue feminist oriented goals. Alambert criticized the communist understanding of the "woman question" and she worked with Maria Amelia Telles de Almeida on a Marxist-feminist book that described women's history. In 1985, the National Council for Women's Rights (CNDM) was created, and within the same year the Conselho Estadual da Condição Feminina (CECF) was set, which was simply São Paulo's equivalent to the CNDM. Alambert was the president of the CECF during 1988. The CECF was able to create the first female police stations. However, although these sorts of institutions were set up, it was still extremely difficult to get funding and have programs set into motion. In Alambert's words they had to, "scramble for funding for paper clips, let alone women's programs."
