= Ivan Pinheiro =

Brazilian politician

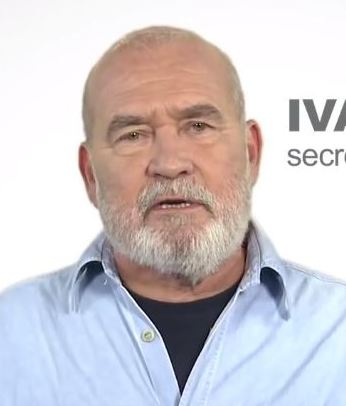

General Secretary of Brazilian Communist Party
- In office March 2005 – 17 October 2016
- Preceded by: Position established
- Succeeded by: Edmilson Costa

Personal details
- Born: Ivan Martins Pinheiro; 18 March 1946 (age 80) Rio de Janeiro, Brazil
- Party: PCB (1982–2023)
- Occupation: Lawyer

Ivan Martins Pinheiro (born 18 March 1946) is a Brazilian politician, former General Secretary of the Brazilian Communist Party (PCB) from 2005 to 2016 and a candidate in the 2010 presidential election. He also ran for mayor of Rio de Janeiro in 1996.

Pinheiro was born in Rio de Janeiro, then capital of Brazil, and started his political life as a student leader at the Colégio Pedro II. He was president of the student board and was arrested for his political activism.

In 1964, when the military installed their dictatorship, Pinheiro was admitted to Law School at the State University of Guanabara (currently UERJ). There, he joined the MR-8, then the most important urban guerrilla in Brazil, and connected to the Brazilian Communist Party. Again he was elected as chair of the student board (Centro Acadêmico Luiz Carpenter).

In 1976, hired by the Banco do Brasil, he brought his Communist advocacy into the labor union of bank employees. In 1978, he was elected chairman of the union of bank workers of Rio de Janeiro, and became a union boss at the same time that Lula was heading the metalworkers in São Paulo. He was elected to the Central Committee of the Party in 1982.

In 1986, he ran for Congress for PCB, but wasn't elected. The next year, he led the party into joining the CUT union federation, which was allied with Lula and his newly founded Worker's Party. In 1989, then secretary-general of the party, Roberto Freire, ran for president of Brazil and Pinheiro supported him. Eventually, they both supported Lula in the run-off.

In the early 1990s, after the fall of the Iron Curtain, the PCB held a congress in which Freire and a group of Central Committee veterans had approved the self dissolution of the party. In January 1992, the remnants of PCB formed the People's Socialist Party (PPS), which increasingly moved rightwards in the political spectrum. Pinheiro then led a group of Marxist–Leninist who re-founded the PCB as a new, yet minor party, in late 1992.

In 2000 and 2004, Ivan Pinheiro ran for city counselor, but was not elected.

During the presidential elections of 2002, Pinheiro and the PCB supported Lula, who was elected president of Brazil.

At the 13th Congress of the PCB, in 2005, in Belo Horizonte, Ivan Pinheiro was elected secretary-general, and the party broke up with Lula. They also abandoned the goal of reunification with the Communist Party of Brazil.

In 2006, the PCB supported Heloísa Helena for president and Pinheiro ran for congress once more, but again wasn't elected.

In July 2023, the Central Committee of the Communist Party decided to expel Pinheiro and four other members for misusing the party's brand for their own interests.

Party political offices
Position established	General Secretary of the Brazilian Communist Party; 2005–2016	Succeeded by Edmilson Costa
