= Elisa Kauffmann Abramovich =

Brazilian activist

Elisa Kauffmann Abramovich (July 8, 1919 - January 4, 1963) was a Brazilian teacher and communist activist of Jewish origin. She was the first woman to be elected councilor in the Municipal Chamber of São Paulo.

She was the daughter of Ashkenazi Jews born in Eastern Europe, who came to Brazil fleeing from misery and lynching. She was married to the merchant Francisco Abramovich, with whom she had two daughters: Fanny and Irene, she was also a teacher at the school Scholem Aleichem, in the neighbourhood of Bom Retiro, in São Paulo. There, she attended to the Jewish victims of persecution who arriving in Brazil.

She became active in politics at a young age, when she met the communist son of her mother's friend, persecuted by the repression of the Estado Novo. Elisa was an ardent leftist militant, and her home was one of the cells of the Brazilian Communist Party in São Paulo. In 1947, she became the first woman to be elected councillor in the São Paulo City Council, but she was impeached before taking office, for being a communist.
