= Leôncio Basbaum =

Brazilian historian

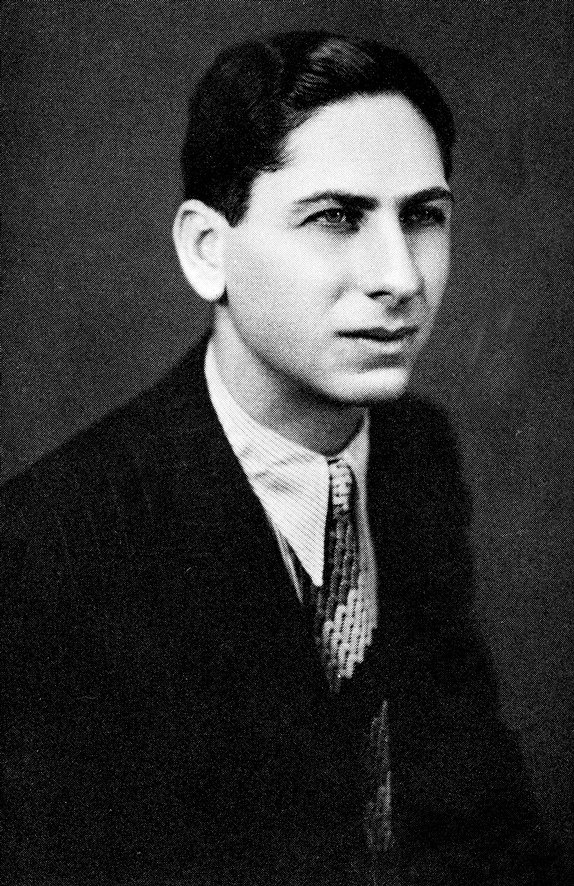
Leôncio Basbaum

Leôncio Basbaum (born 6 November 1907- died 7 March 1969) was a Brazilian Marxist historian, medic, writer and political activist. He was a prominent member of the Brazilian Communist Party (PCB), and he wrote extensively on Brazilian socio-political history and is best remembered for his multi-volume work História Sincera da República.

== Early life and education ==
Child of Jewish immigrants from Ukraine, Basbaum was born and raised in the state of Pernambuco. He spent his youth in Recife before moving to Rio de Janeiro in 1924 to pursue higher education. He attended the Faculty of Medicine at the Federal University of Rio de Janeiro, graduating as a medical doctor in 1929.

== Political activity and career ==
During his student years in Rio de Janeiro, Basbaum became deeply involved in leftist activism. He joined the Brazilian Communist Party (PCB) and helped found the Communist Youth Union (União da Juventude Comunista). Later he abandon medical practice to focus on political organizing, he worked as a publisher, journalist, and activist for Marxist philosophy across Brazil.

== Selected publication ==
- Basbaum, Leôncio (1957–1968). História Sincera da República (in Portuguese). Edições LB.
- Basbaum, Leôncio (1976). Uma Vida em Seis Tempos: Memórias (in Portuguese). Alfa-Ômega.
