= President of Brazil =

Head of state and government

President of the Federative Republic of Brazil
- Presidente da República Federativa do Brasil
- Coat of arms of Brazil

- Presidential standard of Brazil

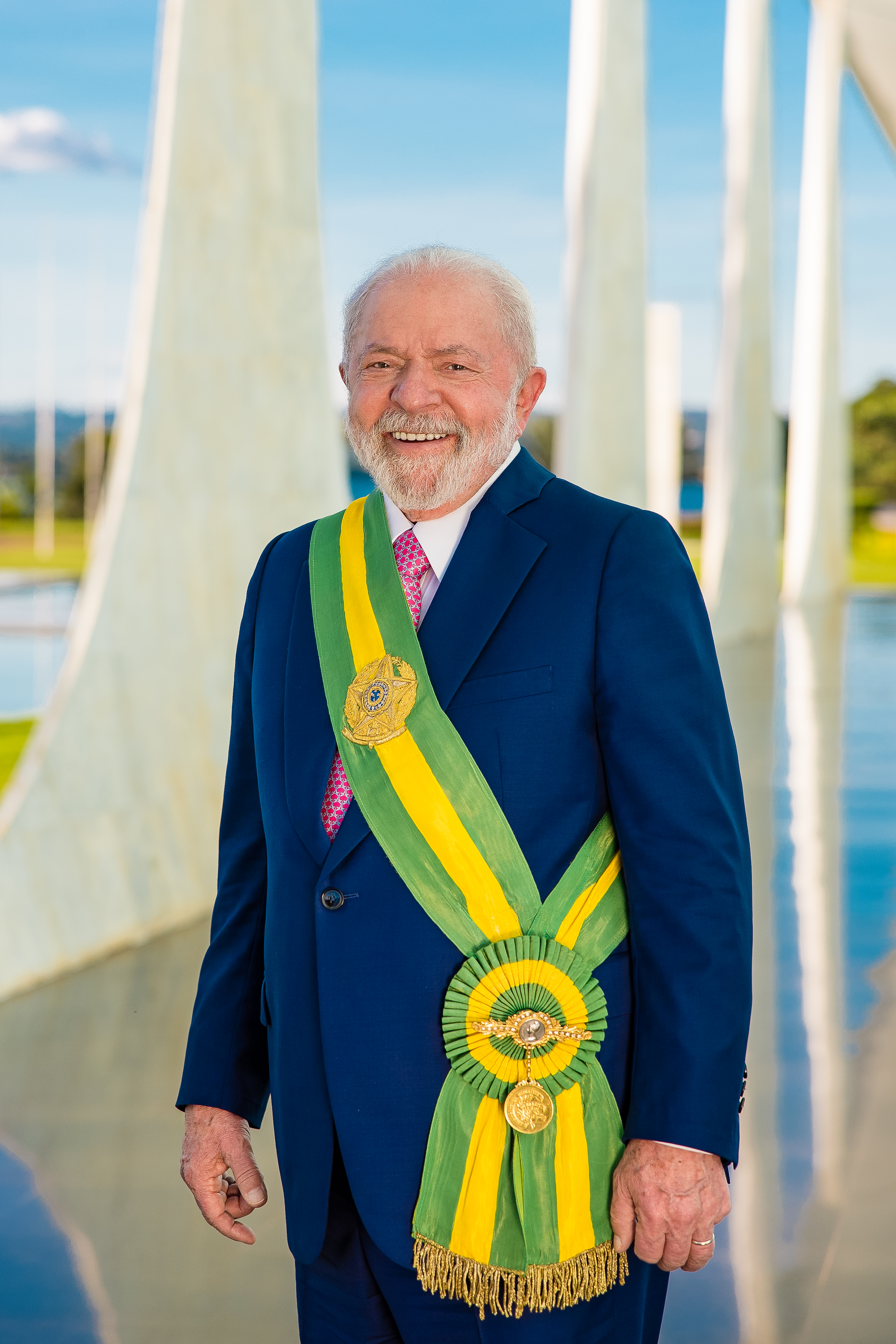
- Incumbent; Luiz Inácio Lula da Silva since 1 January 2023
- Executive branch of the Federal government of Brazil
- Style: Mister (Senhor/a) (formal); His/Her Excellency (Sua Excelência) (diplomatic)
- Status: Head of state Head of government Commander-in-chief
- Member of: Council of Government; National Defense Council; Council of the Republic
- Residence: Palácio da Alvorada; Granja do Torto
- Seat: Palácio do Planalto
- Appointer: Direct popular vote (two rounds if necessary)
- Term length: Four years, renewable once consecutively
- Constituting instrument: Constitution of Brazil (1988)
- Precursor: Emperor of Brazil (as Head of State); Prime Minister of Brazil (as Head of Government)
- Inaugural holder: Deodoro da Fonseca
- Formation: Proclamation of the Republic; 15 November 1889 (136 years ago)
- Succession: Line of succession
- Deputy: Vice President
- Salary: R$ 402,151/US$ 76,309 annually
- Website: www.gov.br/planalto

The president of Brazil (Portuguese: presidente do Brasil), officially the president of the Federative Republic of Brazil (Portuguese: presidente da República Federativa do Brasil) or simply the President of the Republic, is the head of state and head of government of Brazil. The president is the head of the executive branch of the Brazilian government and the commander in-chief of the Brazilian Armed Forces.

The presidential system was established in 1889, upon the proclamation of the republic in a military coup d'état against Emperor Pedro II. Since then, Brazil has had six constitutions, three dictatorships, and three democratic periods. The Constitution of Brazil, along with several constitutional amendments, establishes the requirements, powers, and responsibilities of the president, their term of office and the method of election.

Luiz Inácio Lula da Silva is the 39th and current president. He was sworn in on 1 January 2023.

== Constitutional powers ==
As a republic with a presidential executive, Brazil grants significant powers to the president, who effectively controls the executive branch, represents the country abroad, and appoints the cabinet and, with the approval of the Senate, the judges for the Supreme Federal Court. The president is also the commander-in-chief of the armed forces.

Presidents in Brazil have significant lawmaking powers, exercised either by proposing laws to the National Congress or by using Medidas Provisórias (provisional measures), an instrument with the force of law that the president can enact in cases of urgency and necessity except to make changes to some areas of law (provisional measures cannot be used to change criminal law or electoral law). A provisional measure comes into effect immediately, before Congress votes on it, and remains in force for up to 60 days unless Congress votes to rescind it. The 60-day period can be extended once, up to 120 days. If Congress, on the other hand, votes to approve the provisional measure, it becomes an actual law, with changes decided by the legislative branch. The provisional measure expires at the end of the 60-day period (or the 120-day, in the case of extension), or sooner, if rejected by one of the Houses of Congress.

Article 84 of the current Federal Constitution, determines that the president has the power to

1. appoint and dismiss the ministers of state;
2. exercise, with the assistance of the ministers of state, the higher management of the federal administration;
3. initiate the legislative procedure, in the manner and in the cases set forth in the Constitution;
4. sanction, promulgate, and order the publication of laws, as well as issue decrees and regulations for the true enforcement thereof;
5. veto bills, wholly or in part;
6. provide, by means of decree, on organization and structure of federal administration if there is neither increase of expenses nor creation or extinction of public agencies; and extinction of offices or positions, when vacant;
7. maintain relations with foreign States and to accredit their diplomatic representatives;
8. conclude international treaties, conventions and acts, subject to the ratification of the National Congress of Brazil;
9. decree the state of defense and the state of siege, in accordance with the constitutional procedures that precede and authorize those emergency decrees;
10. decree and enforce federal intervention, in accordance with the constitutional procedures that precede and authorize such exceptional action;
11. upon the opening of the legislative session, send a government message and plan to the National Congress, describing the state of the nation and requesting the actions he deems necessary;
12. grant pardons and reduce sentences, after hearing the entities instituted by law, if necessary;
13. exercise the supreme command of the armed forces, appoint the commanders of navy, army and air force, promote general officers and to appoint them to the offices held exclusively by them;
14. appoint, after approval by the Federal Senate, the Justices of the Supreme Federal Court and those of the superior courts, the Governors of the territories, the Prosecutor General of the Republic, the president and the directors of the Central Bank and other civil servants, when established by law;
15. appoint, with due regard for the provisions of Article 73, the Justices of the Court of Accounts of the Union;
16. appoint judges in the events established by this constitution and the Attorney General of the Union;
17. appoint members of the Council of the Republic, in accordance with article 89, VII;
18. summon and preside over the Council of the Republic and the National Defense Council;
19. declare war, in the event of foreign aggression, authorized by the National Congress or confirmed by it, whenever it occurs between legislative sessions and, under the same conditions, to decree full or partial national mobilization;
20. make peace, authorized or confirmed by the National Congress;
21. award decorations and honorary distinctions;
22. permit, in the cases set forth by supplementary law, foreign forces to pass through the national territory, or to remain temporarily therein;
23. submit to the National Congress the pluriannual plan, the bill of budgetary directives and the budget proposals set forth in this constitution;
24. render, each year, accounts to the National Congress concerning the previous fiscal year, within sixty days of the opening of the legislative session;
25. fill and abolish federal government positions, as set forth by law;
26. issue provisional measures, with force of law, according to Article 62;
27. perform other duties set forth in the constitution.

== Election ==
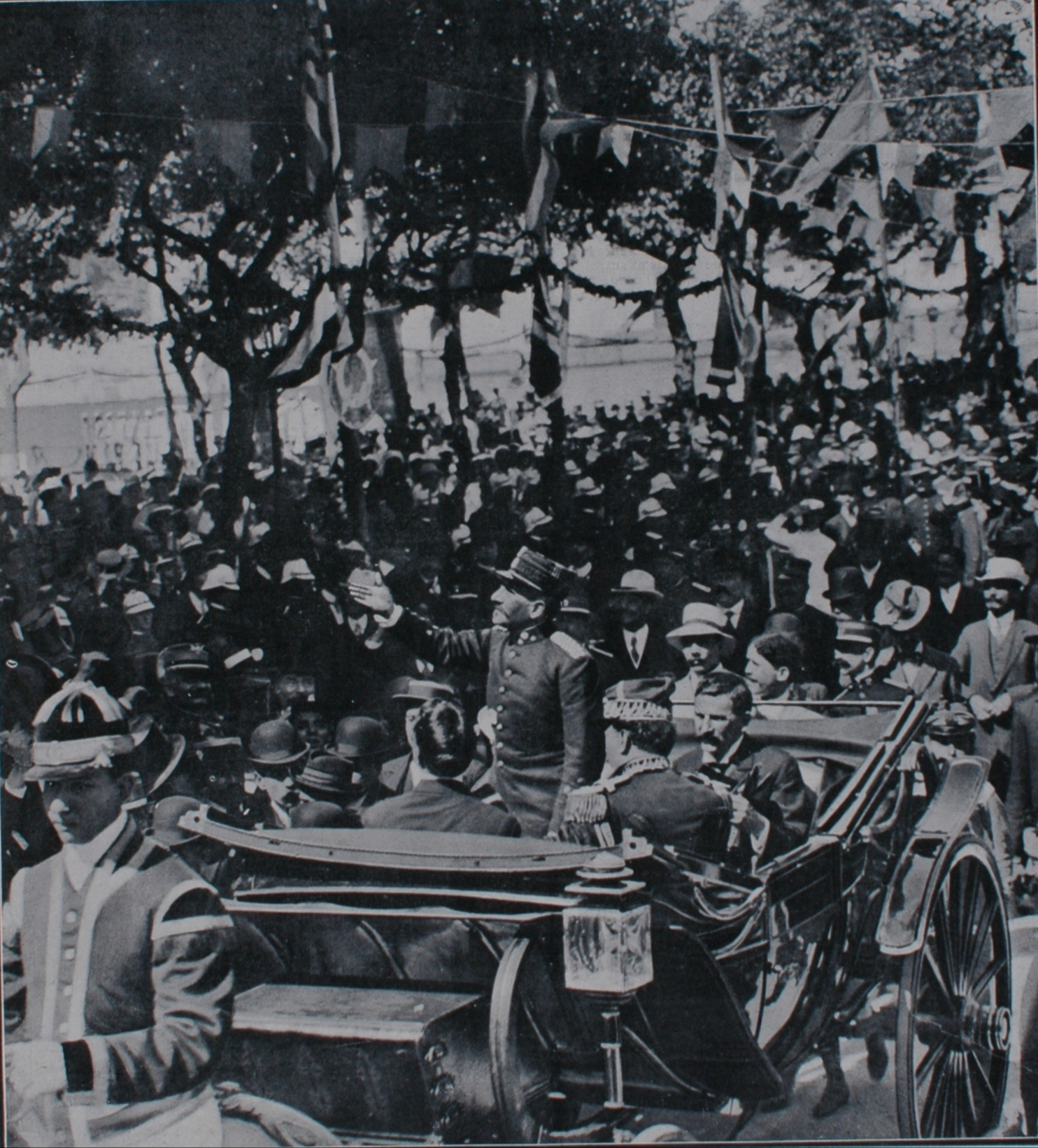
President Hermes da Fonseca waves to the crowd during Inauguration Day parade, 1910

=== Requirements ===
The Constitution of Brazil requires that a president be a native-born citizen of Brazil, at least 35 years of age, a resident of Brazil, in full exercise of their electoral rights, a registered voter, and a member of a political party (write-in or independent candidates are prohibited).

If no presidential candidate receives more than half of the valid votes in the first round, the two candidates who receive the most votes advance to a second-round runoff.

=== Term limits ===
The president of Brazil serves for a term of four years, and may be re-elected for a single consecutive term. This two-term limit, however, is not for life—a former president who has served for two consecutive terms may run for the presidency again after at least one term has elapsed.

A vice president or other officer who succeeds to the presidency or who serves, albeit briefly, as acting president during a certain presidential term may subsequently be elected or reelected to the presidency only once, as the consecutive term limit already applies. In practice, Brazilian vice-presidents almost always serve as acting president at some point during a presidential term, given that, according to the Constitution, the vice-president becomes acting president during the president's travels abroad.

=== Running for other offices ===
A sitting president (or governor or mayor) who wishes to run for a different office, regardless of the intended jurisdiction or branch of government, must resign from office at least six months before election day.

=== History ===
The possibility of reelection was established by the 16th Amendment to the Constitution, in 1997. Before that, presidents had been barred from immediate reelection for all of Brazil's republican history, with the single exception of the latter half of the Vargas Era, from 1937 to 1945. The office was limited to men until the 1937 Constitution. Under the original text of the 1988 Constitution the presidential term lasted 5 years, but it was reduced to 4 years in 1994 by a constitutional amendment.

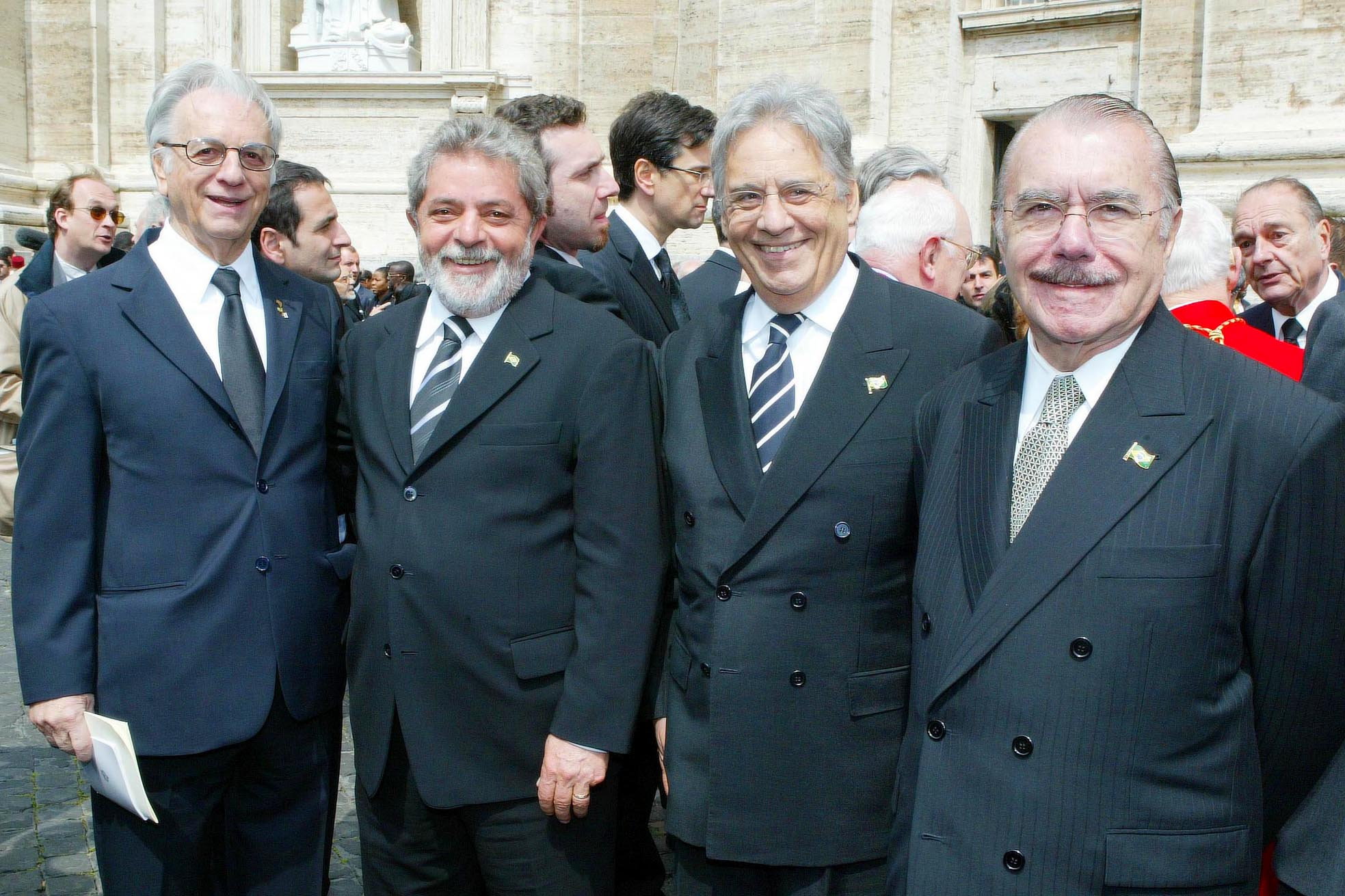

Presidents Itamar Franco, Luiz Inácio Lula da Silva, Fernando Henrique Cardoso, José Sarney, Michel Temer and Dilma Rousseff.

== Compensation and privileges of office ==
Presidential styles of Luiz Inácio Lula da Silva
- Reference style: Senhor Presidente da República "Mr. President of the Republic"
- Spoken style: Senhor Presidente or Presidente "Mr. President" or "President"

As of 2015, the president receives a monthly salary of R$30,934.70, along with an undisclosed expense account to cover travel, goods and services while in office. Given that in Brazil all private and public sector employees and civil servants receive an additional compensation equivalent to one monthly salary after a year of work (this compensation is known as the thirteenth salary), the president receives 13 payments per year, resulting in an annual salary of R$402,151.10.

The Palácio do Planalto in Brasília is the official workplace of the president and the Palácio da Alvorada their official residence. The president is entitled to use its staff and facilities. The Residência Oficial do Torto, popularly known as Granja do Torto, is a ranch located on the outskirts of the capital and is used as a country retreat by the president. The Palácio Rio Negro in Petrópolis, Rio de Janeiro, is a summer retreat of the president, although used rarely. The official residence of the vice president is the Jaburu Palace in Brasília.

In the 2000s, the federal government decided to establish Regional Offices of the Presidency of the Republic in certain key Brazilian cities. Those regional offices are not presidential residences, but they are fully staffed offices ready to receive the president and his ministers at any time, and they function as a presidential workplace when the president is in those cities. The first regional office of the presidency was established in the city of São Paulo, and is located at the Banco do Brasil building at the Paulista Avenue; the building also houses Banco do Brasil's regional headquarters in São Paulo. The presidency of the republic also maintains regional offices in Porto Alegre and in Belo Horizonte.

For ground travel, the president uses the presidential state car, which is an armored version of the 2024 Chery Tiggo 8 Max Drive. A 1952 Rolls-Royce Silver Wraith is used by the president on ceremonial occasions, such as Independence Day commemorations, state visits and the inauguration of the president-elect. The presidential aircraft is a military version of an Airbus A330-200, called KC-30. Two modified Embraer 190 jets, air force designation VC-2, are used for short and medium range presidential travel. When the president is on board, the aircraft receive the call sign "Brazilian Air Force One". Two modified military versions of the Eurocopter Super Puma, air force designation VH-34, are currently used as the main presidential helicopters.

Presidential Amenities

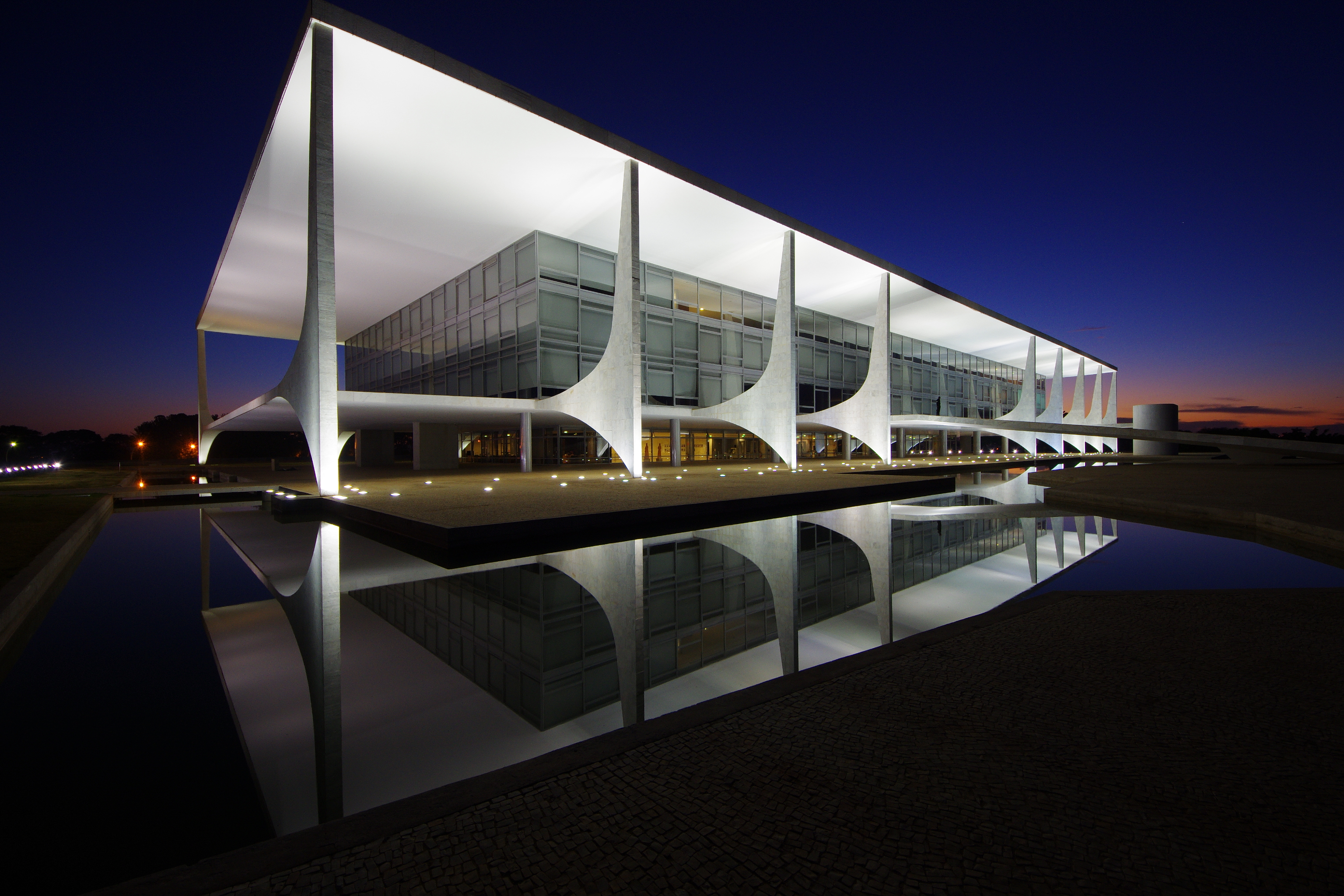
Palácio do Planalto

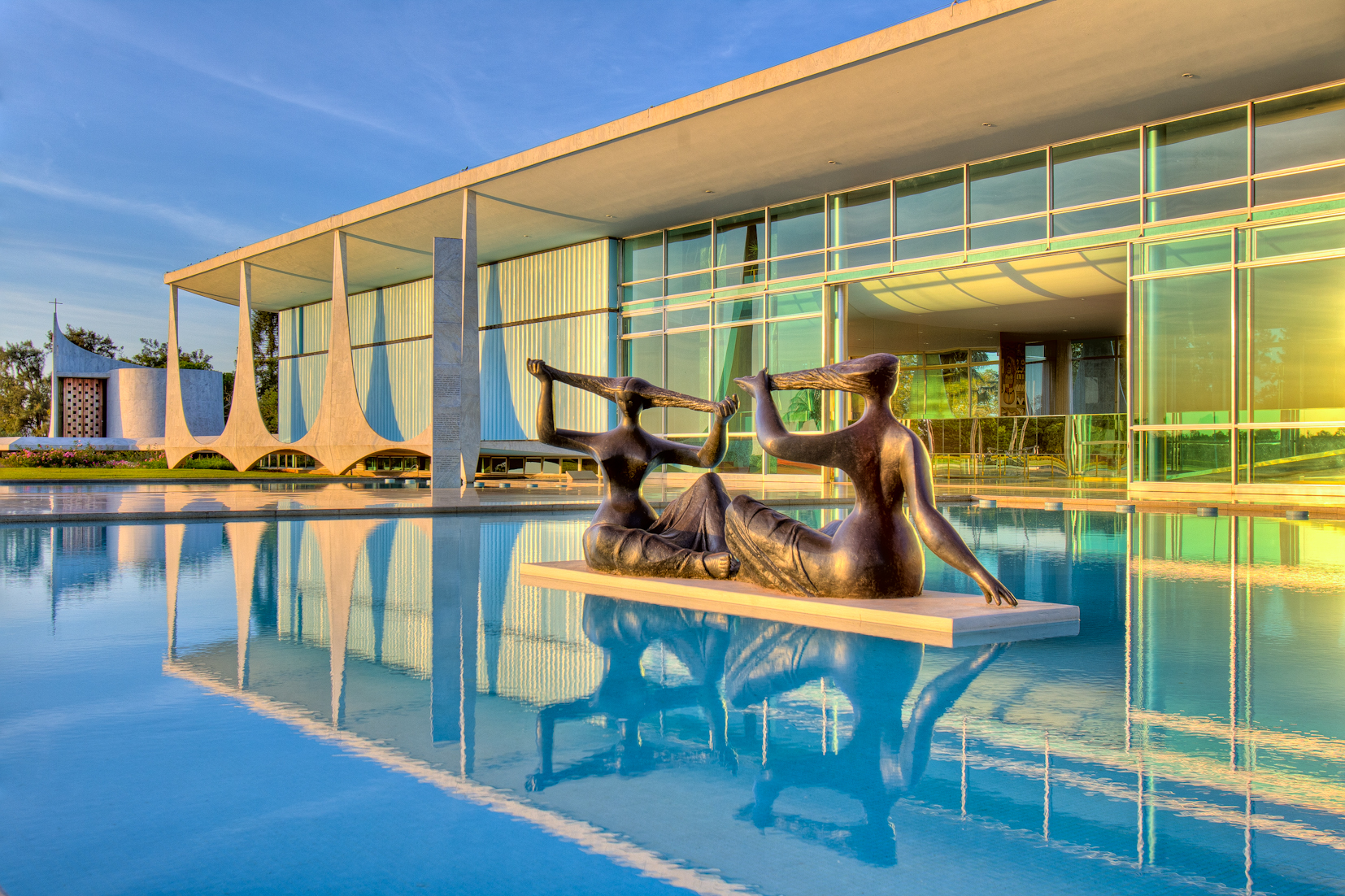
Palácio da Alvorada

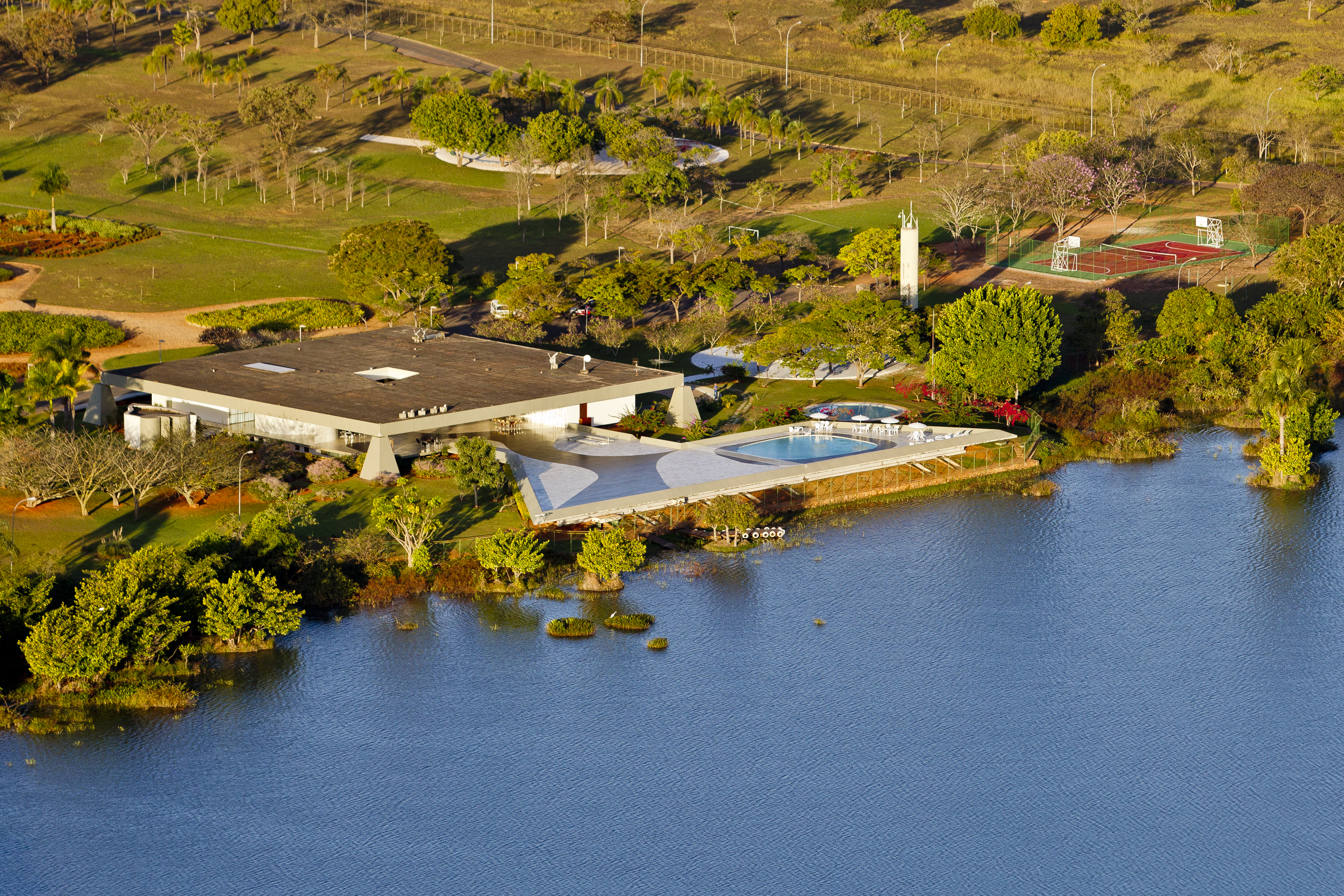
Palácio do Jaburu

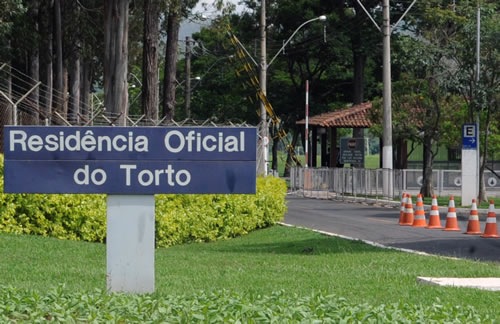
Residência Oficial do Torto

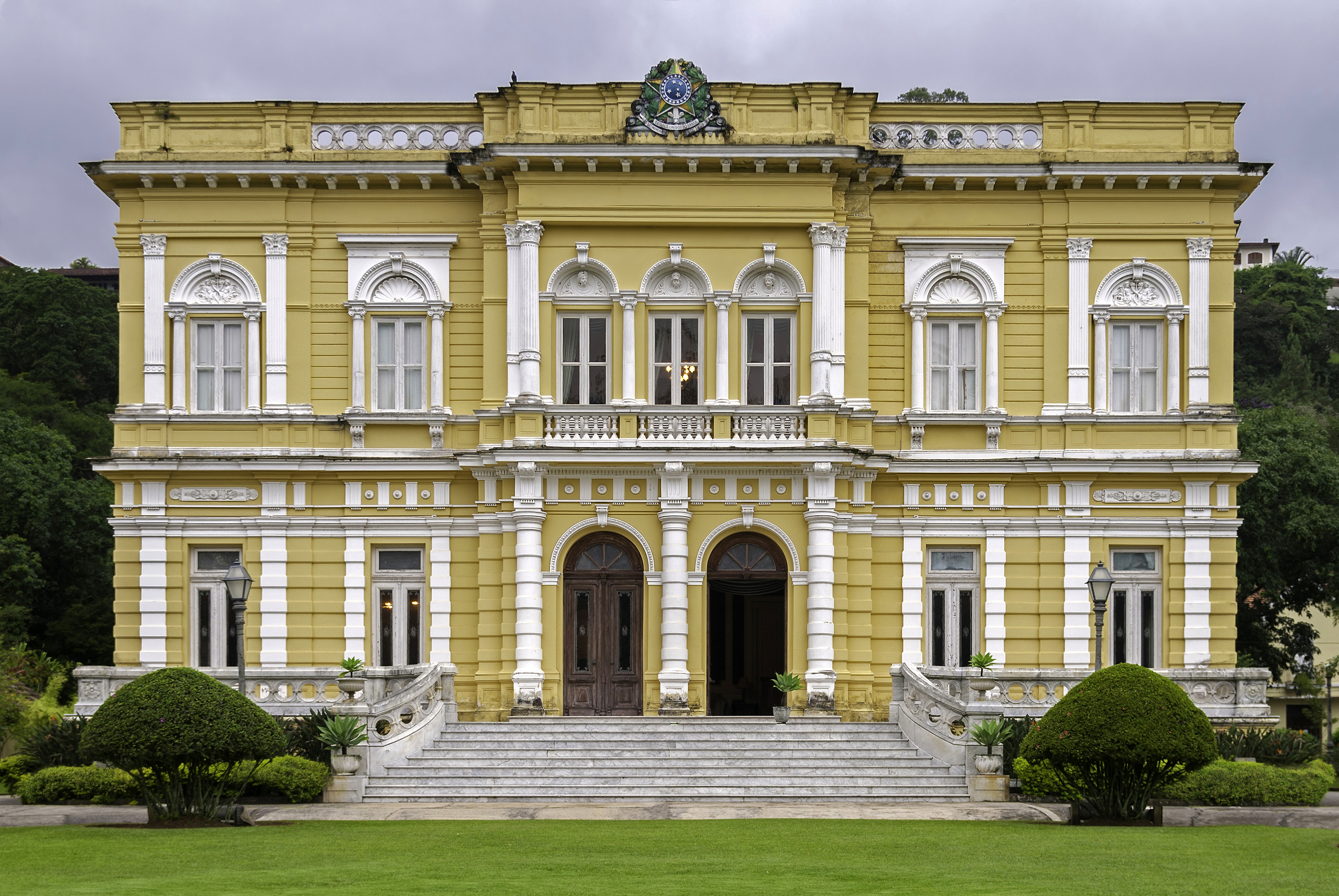
Palácio Rio Negro

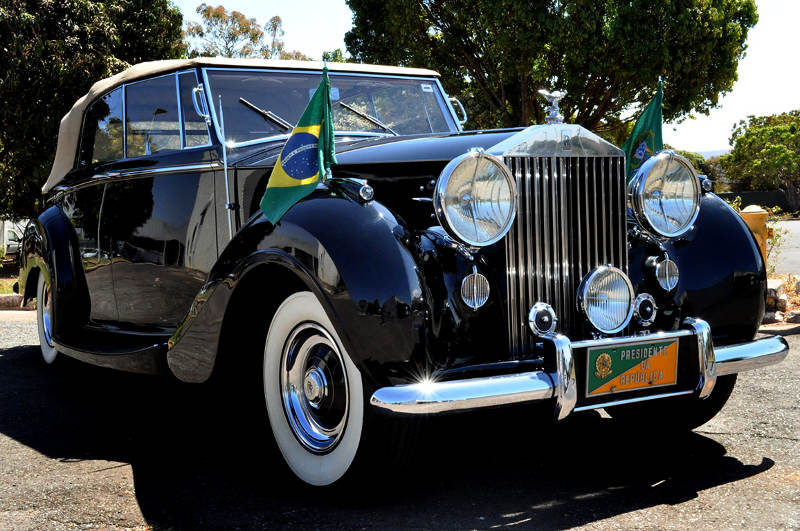
Ceremonial state car

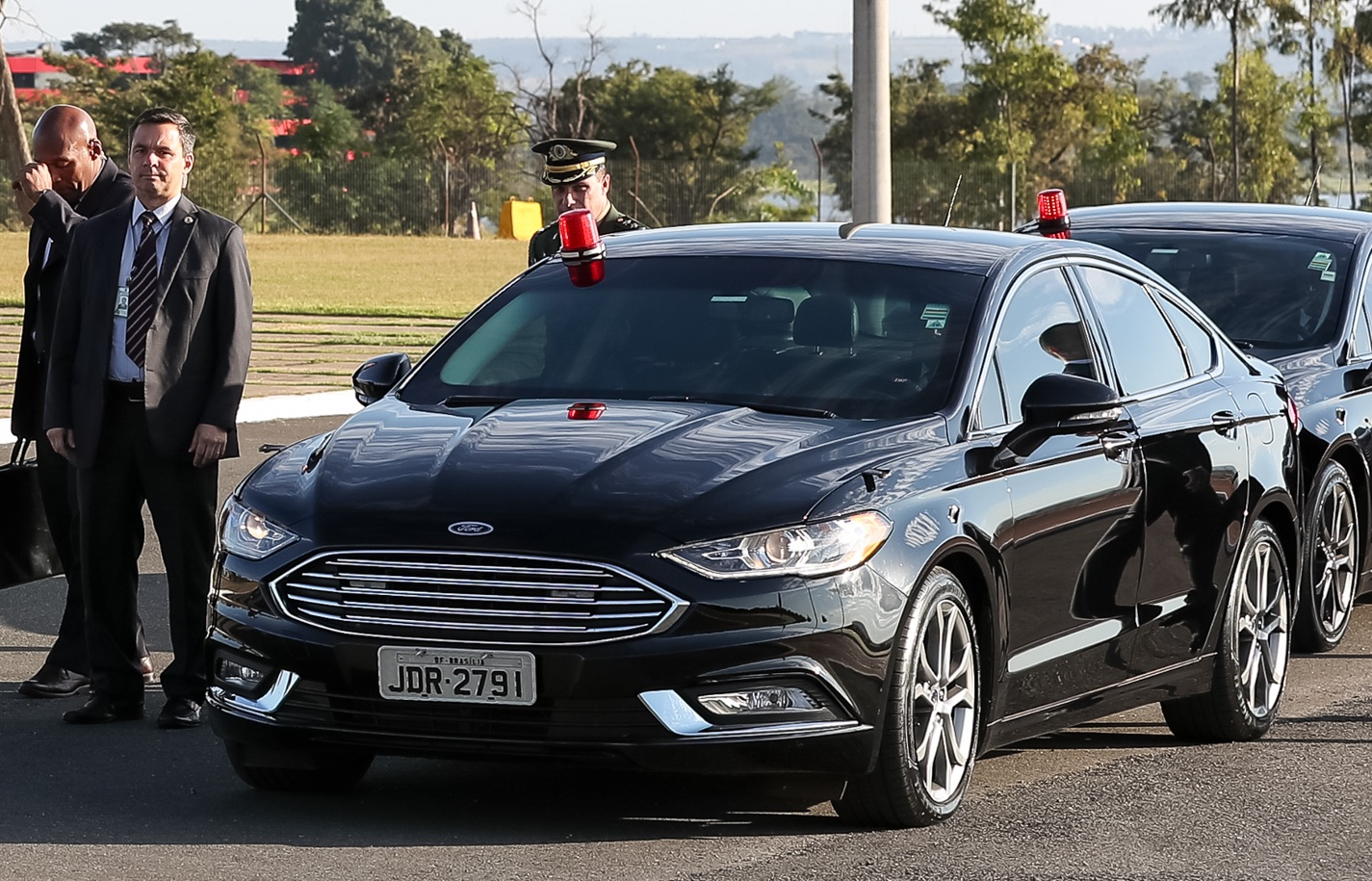
The Presidential state car of Brazil

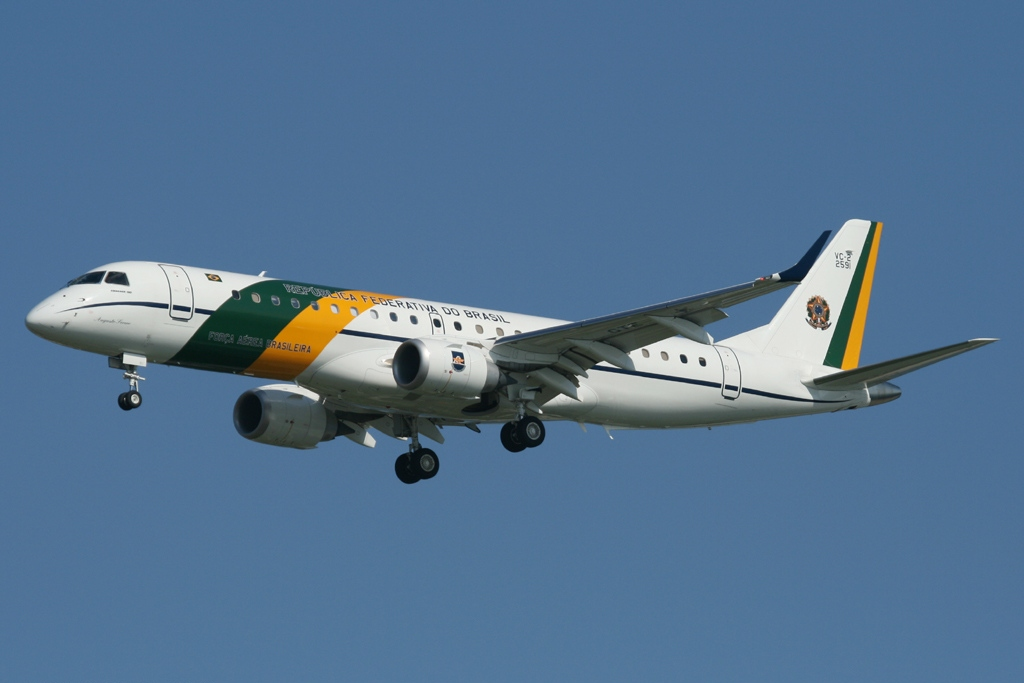
Secondary presidential aircraft (VC-2)

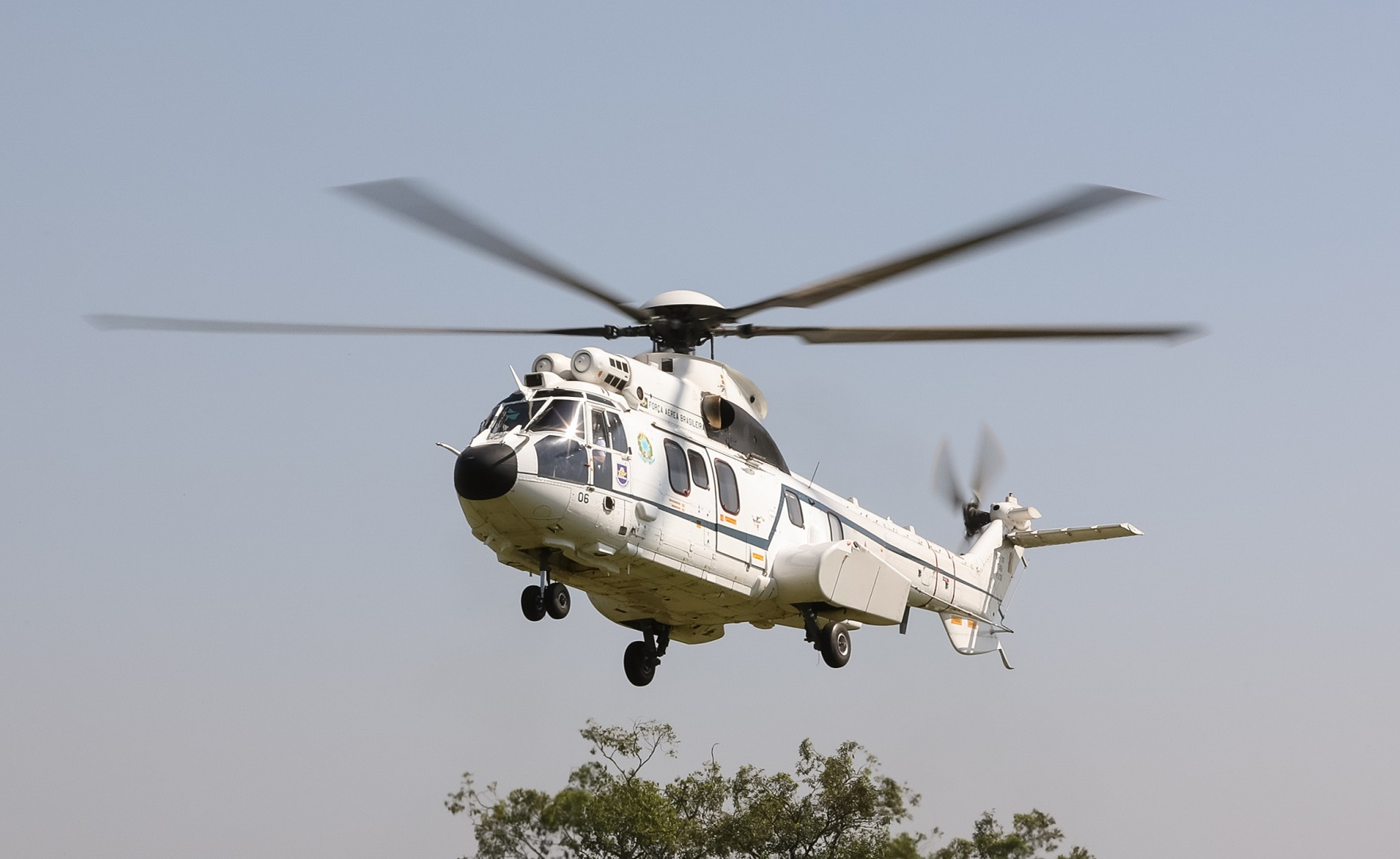
Presidential helicopter (VH-34 and VH-36)

== Removal ==
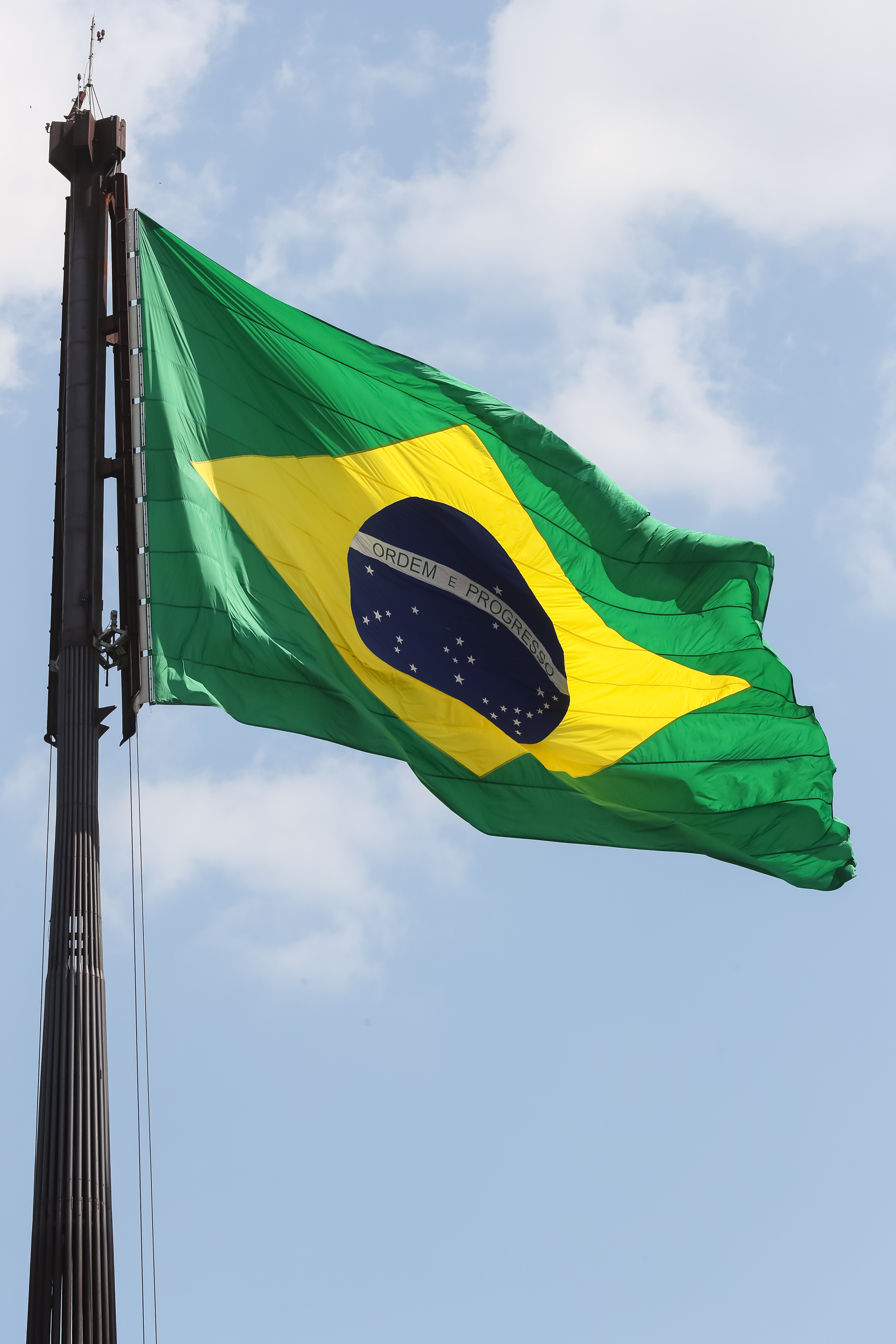
The flag of Brazil

The president may be removed from office using one of two procedures. In either case, two-thirds of the Chamber of Deputies must accept charges against the officeholder (impeachment); and if the Senate accepts the investigation, the president is suspended from exercising the functions of office for up to 180 days. In the case of "common criminal offenses", a trial then takes place at the Supreme Federal Court. In the case of "crimes of malversation", which must fall into one of seven broad areas and which is defined in more detail in law, a trial takes place at the Federal Senate. During the trial, the vice president exercises executive power. If the trial does not result in a conviction within 180 days, the president resumes office; a conviction results in removal from office and succession by the vice president. The seven areas are:

1. The existence of the Union
2. The free exercise of the Legislative Power, the Judicial Power, the Public Prosecution and the constitutional Powers of the units of the Federation
3. The exercise of political, individual and social rights
4. The internal security of the country
5. Probity in the administration
6. The budgetary law
7. Compliance with the laws and with court decisions

== Post-presidency ==
The following privileges are guaranteed to former presidents by law:

- Permanent security protection (by the presidential guard – Batalhão da Guarda Presidencial)
- The use of two official vehicles (for life)
- Repository funding for a presidential library
- Lifelong monthly pension for their widows and unmarried daughters
- Pension for sons of deceased ex-presidents until they come of age

== Office-holders ==
All presidents of Brazil have borne the title President of the Republic. That title has been used by all the constitutions of Brazil since the proclamation of the Republic to refer to the head of the Executive Branch. However, from the proclamation of the Republic in 1889 until 1937 the country was officially styled Republic of the United States of Brazil, and from 1937 to 1967 the country was styled simply The United States of Brazil, and thus the full title of the presidents of the Republic from 1891 until 1967—that is, from Deodoro da Fonseca's inauguration as president (between 1889 and 1891 he served as head of the provisional government) until the end of Humberto Castello Branco's term in 1967—was President of the Republic of the United States of Brazil. On 15 March 1967, the country's official name was changed to Federative Republic of Brazil. On that same date, Arthur da Costa e Silva was sworn in as president succeeding Castello Branco. Since Costa e Silva, therefore, all presidents of Brazil have borne the full title of President of the Federative Republic of Brazil.

== Second latest election ==
Candidate	Running mate	Party	First round		Second round	
Candidate	Running mate	Party	Votes	%	Votes	%
Luiz Inácio Lula da Silva	Geraldo Alckmin (PSB)	Workers' Party	57,259,504	48.43	60,345,999	50.90
Jair Bolsonaro	Walter Braga Netto	Liberal Party	51,072,345	43.20	58,206,354	49.10
Simone Tebet	Mara Gabrilli (PSDB)	Brazilian Democratic Movement	4,915,423	4.16		
Ciro Gomes	Ana Paula Matos	Democratic Labour Party	3,599,287	3.04		
Soraya Thronicke	Marcos Cintra	Brazil Union	600,955	0.51		
Luiz Felipe d'Avila	Tiago Mitraud	New Party	559,708	0.47		
Kelmon Souza	Luiz Cláudio Gamonal	Brazilian Labour Party	81,129	0.07		
Leonardo Péricles	Samara Martins	Popular Unity	53,519	0.05		
Sofia Manzano	Antonio Alves	Brazilian Communist Party	45,620	0.04		
Vera Lúcia Salgado	Kunã Yporã Tremembé	United Socialist Workers' Party	25,625	0.02		
José Maria Eymael	João Barbosa Bravo	Christian Democracy	16,604	0.01		
Total			118,229,719	100.00	118,552,353	100.00
Valid votes			118,229,719	95.59	118,552,353	95.41
Invalid votes			3,487,874	2.82	3,930,695	3.16
Blank votes			1,964,779	1.59	1,769,668	1.42
Total votes			123,682,372	100.00	124,252,716	100.00
Registered voters/turnout			156,454,011	79.05	156,454,011	79.42
Source: Superior Electoral Court (first round), Supreme Electoral Court (second round)

== See also ==
- List of presidents of Brazil
- Brazilian presidential inauguration
- Politics of Brazil
- Cabinet of Brazil
- Vice President of Brazil
- Brazilian Air Force One
- Presidential Guard Battalion (Brazil)
