= Granja do Torto =

Official residence maintained by the Presidency of Brazil

Residência Oficial do Torto
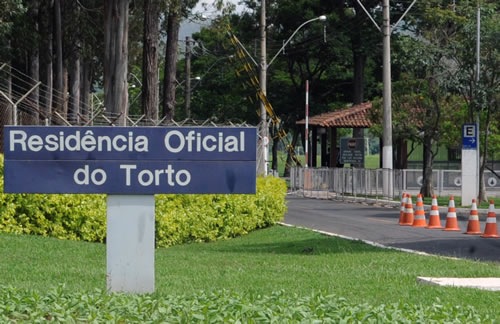
- Entrance of the Granja do Torto

- Location within Brasília

General information
- Location: Brasília, Brazil
- Coordinates: 15.705582°S 47.905975°W

The Granja do Torto (Officially the Residência Oficial do Torto) is an official residence maintained by the Presidency of Brazil. It is a property with ranch-style features, located on the outskirts of the capital city of Brasília. It is used mainly as a weekend retreat by the president.

Situated on 36 hectares of land, the complex includes an artificial lake and stream, swimming pool, soccer field, multisport arena, helipad and an area of native forest.

== History ==
The official residence of the president is the Palácio da Alvorada, inaugurated in 1958. However, the Granja do Torto has served as home to some former presidents, namely João Goulart, João Figueiredo and Luiz Inácio Lula da Silva. It was also used by President Dilma Rousseff during her transition (from her election until her inauguration).

== Art gallery ==
The Granja do Torto has works of art that are part of the art collection of the Presidency of the Republic. Works of different epochs and styles, such as "Italian pot with flowers", by Philip Sutton, and screen printings by Carlos Scliar.
