= Sofia Manzano =

Brazilian politician

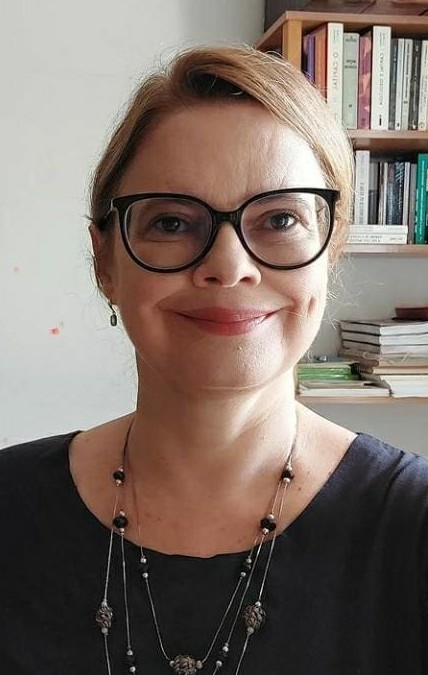
- Sofia Manzano in 2022

Personal details
- Born: Sofia Padua Manzano; 19 May 1971 (age 55) São Paulo, Brazil
- Party: PCB (1989–present)
- Education: Pontifical Catholic University of São Paulo (BEconSc); University of Campinas Institute of Economics (MDE); Faculty of Philosophy, Languages and Human Sciences, University of São Paulo (MSc)
- Profession: Professor, economist

Sofia Padua Manzano (born 19 May 1971) is a Brazilian economist, professor and politician. She was the Brazilian Communist Party candidate for President in the 2014 and 2022 Brazilian general election.

== Electoral history ==
Year	Election	Party	Office	Coalition	Partners	Votes	Percent	Result	Ref.
2014	Brazilian Presidential Election	PCB	Vice President	None	Mauro Iasi (PCB)	47,845	0.05%	Lost	
2022	Brazilian Presidential Election	PCB	President	None	Antonio Alves (PCB)	45,620	0.04%	Lost	

Party political offices
Preceded by Edmilson Costa	Brazilian Communist Party nominee for Vice President of Brazil; 2014	Succeeded by Antonio Alves
Preceded by Mauro Iasi	Brazilian Communist Party nominee for President of Brazil; 2022	Succeeded by Edmilson Costa
