= Brazilian Communist Party =

Political party in Brazil

Brazilian Communist Party Partido Comunista Brasileiro
- Abbreviation: PCB
- General Secretary: Edmilson Costa
- Founded: 25 March 1922; 104 years ago
- Registered: 9 May 1996; 30 years ago
- Headquarters: Rua das Marrecas, 27, 3º andar, Centro; Rio de Janeiro
- Newspaper: O Poder Popular
- Think tank: Fundação Dinarco Reis
- Youth wing: União da Juventude Comunista
- Women's wing: Coletivo Feminista Classista Ana Montenegro
- Black wing: Coletivo Negro Minervino de Oliveira
- LGBT wing: Coletivo LGBT Comunista
- Membership: 12,523
- Ideology: Communism (Brazilian); Marxism–Leninism
- Political position: Far-left
- Regional affiliation: São Paulo Forum
- International affiliation: IMCWP
- Colours: Red; Yellow
- Anthem: "A Internacional"
- TSE Identification Number: 21

Website
- pcb.org.br

The Brazilian Communist Party (Portuguese: Partido Comunista Brasileiro, PCB), originally the Communist Party of Brazil (Partido Comunista do Brasil), is a Marxist-Leninist party in Brazil, founded on 25 March 1922.

Arguably the oldest active political party in Brazil, it played an important role in the country's 20th-century history despite the relatively small number of members. During the First Brazilian Republic era, the party opposed the ruling political order. Although the PCB was founded after the end of the tenentism movement, its most prominent leader, Luís Carlos Prestes, had previously led the Coluna Prestes (a rebel army which marched throughout the country) and later joined the party, becoming one of its leading figures. The PCB supported the Revolution of 1930 before later becoming an opponent of the Vargas government. The party was outlawed during the Estado Novo (1937–1945), briefly returned to legality after the dictatorship's fall, and was banned again in 1947, remaining underground for most of the following four decades.

In the 1960s, the Sino-Soviet split led to a factional dispute that resulted in the formation of the PCdoB (Communist Party of Brazil) of Maoist orientation. Despite the split, both communist parties were united in opposition to the military dictatorship that ruled from 1964 to 1985. After the redemocratization of Brazil, PCB became an official registered party, however, with the fall of the Soviet Union and the collapse of communism, precipitated a crisis within the party, and in 1992 a majority faction dissolved the PCB and founded the democratic socialist Popular Socialist Party (PPS), inheriting the legal registration and identification number of the PCB, 23. That party has since moved towards the centre and now goes by the name Cidadania. A minority opposed the dissolution, reconstituted the PCB, and has continued to operate under its historic name.

The youth organization of the PCB is the Communist Youth Union and is a member of the World Federation of Democratic Youth.

== History ==
=== Foundation ===
The Brazilian Communist Party (in Portuguese, Partido Comunista Brasileiro), abbreviated as the PCB, was founded on 25 March 1922 in the city of Niterói, Rio de Janeiro. On that day, nine representatives of communist groups from the cities of São Paulo, Santos, Cruzeiro, Porto Alegre, Recife, Niterói, Juiz de Fora and Rio de Janeiro met and approved the party's statutes and the twenty-one conditions for entering the Communist International, though the PCB was not recognized by the Comintern in its first years due to its eclectic ideological roots. The meeting ended with all seventy-three members of the party singing L'Internationale.

=== Early years ===
The PCB's first years were marked by an effort to encourage socialist thinking in Brazil. There had been moderate socialist parties, newspapers and congresses, but much unlike the strong social-democratic parties that existed in many European countries. The radical anti-capitalist thinking had been dominated by anarchists and anarcho-syndicalists, who also dominated the labour movement, such as in the case of the 1917 anarchist actions in São Paulo. Inspired by the Russian Revolution, a group of former anarchist militants who were disappointed in the lack of unity and force of the movement, turned communist and started the PCB. At the same time, some other figures from Brazil's early labour and socialist movements became inspired by forms of military and authoritarian populism, like the tenentes, that eventually led to the Vargas-revolution of 1930.

During the first years, the party was declared illegal by the government. On 1 May 1925, during the party's Second Congress, its weekly newspaper A Classe Operária (The Working Class) was announced, with five thousand copies being sold on the factories. This number grew to nine thousand copies by the ninth edition, but the police shut the newspaper down shortly after the twelfth edition was published. The paper reappeared in 1928, after the Third Congress was held.

By 1930, after being recognized by the Communist International and with its Socialist Youth division formed, the PCB had nearly eleven hundred members. This marks the beginning of a long period of submission to, initially the Third International, and, after its dissolution, to the political leadership of the Communist Party of the Soviet Union. This decade also marked two cycles on the party's history: one of increasing influence, until 1935, and one of decline, until 1942. Both cycles are comprehensible when seen in the context of the Vargas era.

=== Reorganization and growth ===
In 1943, during the so-called Mantiqueira Conference, the party secretly met in the small city of Engenheiro Passos, Rio de Janeiro, and in an open letter to Vargas decided to support a declaration of war on the Axis. At the same time, Luís Carlos Prestes was elected to the party's presidency. In 1945, after Vargas's dictatorship ended, the PCB became legal once again. By 1947, it had nearly two hundred thousand members. In the 1947 legislative election, it received 480,000 votes or about 9% of total votes cast. However, this period of official tolerance did not last long, as President Dutra denounced the PCB as "internationalist, and therefore not committed to Brazil's own interests" in 1948, an action supported by the American government.

In the 1950s, as the party was driven underground, it began supporting major workers' strikes around Brazil. However, this did not prevent the beginning of internal clashes between different factions within the PCB. This became more evident after the Soviet Communist Party's 20th Congress, when Nikita Khrushchev denounced Joseph Stalin's policies. The factionalization of the party accelerated after a new Manifesto was passed in 1958, proposing new ways of achieving communist goals. This Manifesto linked the establishment of socialism to the broadening of democracy. Some of its top leaders, dissatisfied with the new Soviet line, quit the PCB and formed a new party, Communist Party of Brazil (Partido Comunista do Brasil – PCdoB) in 1962.

In the mid-1960s the U.S. State Department estimated the number of organized communists in Brazil to around 31,000.

=== Military rule years ===
With this new orientation, the PCB grew in size and exercised a much greater role in the Brazilian left. However, the alliance forged with the other parties did not survive the 1964 Brazilian coup d'état. PCB did play an important role against the dictatorship, by organizing the workers movement and participating in efforts to unite the opposition in its demands for democratic reforms. At that point in time the communists were a fraction of the democratic opposition front, the Brazilian Democratic Movement (MDB). It refused, for example, to engage in armed struggle, differently from other left wing organizations that decided to follow that path. The clandestine operations and the political disputes regarding the strategies to resist the military regime led to many important leaders leaving the party, while many others died in the hands of the military regime. To the end of the dictatorship, while the Communist Party in Brazil was involved in several internal clashes, the Worker's Party (Partido dos Trabalhadores) was founded. Its creation was the project of a series of left wing groups independent from the PCB (Trotskyists, communist dissidents, ex-guerrillas, sectors of the Catholic Left, independent unionists and intellectuals). It was structured as an alternative to Communist-led unionism in Brazil. Forswearing the Popular Front strategy adopted by the PCB, the PT chose instead to take a more radical stance against the military regime and gained a strong presence in between high skilled workers and middle-class intellectuals. The growth of the PT accelerated the fragmentation process inside the PCB leading ultimately to a big split.

=== Crisis and formation of the PPS ===
After the 1979 amnesty, the PCB's leaders began to restructure the party. The 1982 Congress confirmed its democratic agenda, declaring the PCB "a party of the masses, linking socialist goals to true democracy, which will be constructed based on the values of freedom". Once again, internal clashes developed in the party, as it was passing through a process of renewal while its influence in society declined. The fall of the Eastern Bloc was also a strong blow to the party, turning the renewal process into one where Marxism began to be abandoned by party leaders. This crisis reached its high point in January 1992.

A group led by the then-President Roberto Freire called its 10th Congress despite a Congressional resolution which had been passed a year earlier that the party would not call a congress for that year and that determined that the party would be kept. Nevertheless, Freire managed to organize it and allow people who were not members of the party to vote. That congress voted to dissolve the PCB and refound it as the democratic socialist Socialist People's Party (Partido Popular Socialista – PPS), in a way similar to what had transpired in Italy.

However a small group, led by Ivan Pinheiro, questioning the legality of the 10th Congress, decided to keep the party Marxist–Leninist.

=== Refoundation and reorganization ===
After the dissolution of the PCB, decided by the 10th Congress, the Central Committee minority that was opposed to this action organized an "Extraordinary Reorganization Conference", where it decided to rebuild the party with the maintaining of its identity and by reviewing the path that it had followed in the precedent years. The party then started a battle in order to gain the rights to use the name Brazilian Communist Party and the acronym PCB (which was contested by the members of the PPS) and to legalize the party. In 1996, the PCB would be officially registered.

The party has realized four congresses since then: the 10th (1993), 11th (1996), 12th (2000), and the 13th (2006). It remains small, in spite of some recent growth during the government of Luiz Inácio Lula da Silva and the crisis of PT (it should be noticed that the main result of this process was the Socialism and Liberty Party). Although competing in elections and participating in wider electoral fronts, its electoral results were insignificant.

In 2006, the PCB agreed on a nationwide alliance with two other left-wing parties, PSOL and PSTU. Putting aside some significant ideological differences, the three parties built a common agenda to try to break the polarity between presidential candidates Luiz Inácio Lula da Silva (PT) and Geraldo Alckmin (PSDB). The coalition also extended to gubernatorial and parliament elections to take place at the same time all over the country. The PCB elected a state deputy (Jorge Souza, in the state of Amapá) and has about 20 local representatives.

The party's union branch currently builds the central Intersindical and is growing greatly in the union movement. The student movement is responsibility of the Young Communist Union, which is also growing in size.

The last party's Congress, the 13th, in 2005, voted to abolish the post of "president" and use only the traditional position of "General Secretary".

== Electoral results ==
=== Presidential elections ===
Election	Candidate	Running mate	Colligation	First round		Second round		Result
Election	Candidate	Running mate	Colligation	Votes	%	Votes	%	Result
1922	None	None	None	–	–	–	–	–
1926	None	None	None	–	–	–	–	–
1930	Minervino de Oliveira (PCB)	None	None	151	0,008% (#3)	-	-	Lost ✗
1930	None	Gastão Valentim (PCB)	None	141	0,007% (#3)	–	–	Lost ✗
1934	None	None	None	–	–	–	–	–
1945	Yedo Fiúza (PCB)	None	None	569,818	9,71% (#3)	–	–	Lost ✗
1945	None	None	None	–	–	–	–	–
1950	None	None	None	–	–	–	–	–
1955	None*	None	None	–	–	-	-	–
1960	None**	None	None	-	-	-	-	–
1964	None	None	None	–	–	–	–	–
1966	None	None	None	–	–	–	–	–
1969	None	None	None	–	–	–	–	–
1974	None	None	None	–	–	–	–	–
1978	None	None	None	–	–	–	–	–
1985	None	None	None	–	–	–	–	–
1989	Roberto Freire (PCB)	Sérgio Arouca (PCB)	None	769,123	1.13% (#8)	–	–	Lost ✗
1994	Luiz Inácio Lula da Silva (PT)	Aloizio Mercadante (PT)	PT; PSB; PPS; PV; PCdoB; PCB; PSTU	17,122,127	27.07 (#2)	–	–	Lost ✗
1998	Luiz Inácio Lula da Silva (PT)	Leonel Brizola (PDT)	PT; PDT; PSB; PCdoB; PCB	21,475,218	31.71% (#2)	–	–	Lost ✗
2002	Luiz Inácio Lula da Silva (PT)	José Alencar (PL)	PT; PL; PCdoB; PMN; PCB	39,455,233	46.44% (#1)	52,793,394	61,27%	Elected ✓
2006	Heloísa Helena (PSOL)	César Benjamin (PSOL)	PSOL; PCB; PSTU	6,575,393	6.85% (#3)	–	–	Lost ✗
2010	Ivan Pinheiro (PCB)	Edmilson Costa (PCB)	None	39,136	0.04% (#9)	–	–	Lost ✗
2014	Mauro Iasi (PCB)	Sofia Manzano (PCB)	None	47,845	0.05% (#10)	–	–	Lost ✗
2018	Guilherme Boulos (PSOL)	Sônia Guajajara (PSOL)	PSOL; PCB	617,122	0.58% (#10)	–	–	Lost ✗
2022	Sofia Manzano (PCB)	Antonio Alves (PCB)	None	45,620	0.04 (#9)	–	–	Lost ✗
2026	Edmilson Costa (PCB)	Cleusa Santos (PCB)	None	22,586	0.02 (#10)	–	–	Lost ✗
Source: Election Resources: Federal Elections in Brazil – Results Lookup *PCB supported Juscelino Kubitschek (PSD) informally in 1955, due to its illegality **PCB supported Henrique Teixeira Lott (PSD) informally in 1960, due to its illegality

=== Parliamentary elections ===
Year	Elections	Votes	%	Seats
1945	Chamber of Deputies	511.302	8.45%	14
1945	Federal Senate	1.095.843	9.73%	1
1947	Chamber of Deputies	479.024	9.2%	2 *
1947	Federal Senate	151.182	2.5%	0
1986	Chamber of Deputies	380,592	0.8%	3
1986	Federal Senate **	–	–	–
1990	Chamber of Deputies			3
1990	Federal Senate			

* The 1947 elections had just a complementary character at the federal level (since the deputies elected in 1945 had mandates until 1950) and elected the State Chambers according to the new Constitution. The PCB elected 46 state deputies and become a major party in the Federal District (at this time, the city of Rio de Janeiro). ** The party didn't launch any candidates to the Senate, choosing to support other parties' candidates, following the party tactics of a "democratic front".

== Congresses ==
- I Congress – Niterói-RJ, March 1922
- II Congress – May 1925
- III Congress – December 1928/January 1929
- IV Congress – November 1954
- V Congress – August/September 1960
- VI Congress – December 1967
- VII Congress – São Paulo-SP, December 1982 – the Congress was invaded by the police and only concluded, without a new meeting of the delegates, in 1984
- VIII Congress (Extraordinary) – Brasília-DF, June 1987
- IX Congress – Rio de Janeiro-RJ, May/June 1991
- X Congress – Rio de Janeiro-RJ, 1993
- XI Congress – Rio de Janeiro-RJ, 1996
- XII Congress – April 2000
- XIII Congress – Belo Horizonte-MG, March 2005
- XIV Congress – Rio de Janeiro-RJ, October 2009
- XV Congress: São Paulo, April 2014
- XVI Congress: São Paulo, November 2021

== Leaders ==
=== General Secretaries ===
- Abílio de Nequete — 1922
- Astrojildo Pereira — 1924–1930
- Heitor Ferreira Lima — 1931
- Fernando de Lacerda — 1931–1932
- José Vilar — 1932
- Duvitiliano Ramos — 1932
- Domingos Brás — 1932
- Luís Carlos Prestes — 1943–1980
- Giocondo Dias — 1980–1985
- Ivan Pinheiro — 2005–2016
- Edmilson Costa — 2016–present

=== Presidents ===
- Giocondo Dias — 1985–1987
- Salomão Malina — 1987–1991
- Roberto Freire — 1991–1992
- Oscar Niemeyer — 1992–1996
- Zuleide Faria de Mello — 1996–2008

== Newspapers and magazines ==
- Voz da Unidade – the main organ of the party in the 80's, weekly
- Novos Rumos – theoretical magazine 1950s–1960s, open to the contribution of personalities and currents outside of the party
- O Poder popular – current newspaper

== See also ==
- Brazilian communist uprising of 1935
- List of political parties in Brazil
- List of communist parties
- Politics of Brazil
- Elisa Kauffmann Abramovich

== Sources ==
- PCdoB timeline
- Contribuição à história do marxismo no Brasil (1987–1994)
- Arquivo da Memória Operária do Rio de Janeiro

Preceded by 20 – PODE	Numbers of Brazilian Official Political Parties; 21 – BCP (PCB)	Succeeded by 22 – LP (PL)
