= Tiago Mitraud =

Brazilian politician (born 1985)

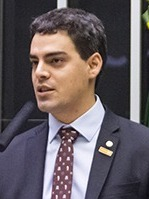
- Mitraud in 2022

Member of the Chamber of Deputies
- In office 1 February 2019 – 31 January 2023
- Constituency: Minas Gerais

Personal details
- Born: 15 August 1985 (age 40)
- Party: New Party (since 2017)

Tiago Lima Mitraud de Castro Leite (born 15 August 1985) is a Brazilian politician. From 2019 to 2023, he was a member of the Chamber of Deputies. In the 2022 presidential election, he was a candidate for vice president of Brazil.
