= Soraya Thronicke =

Brazilian politician and lawyer

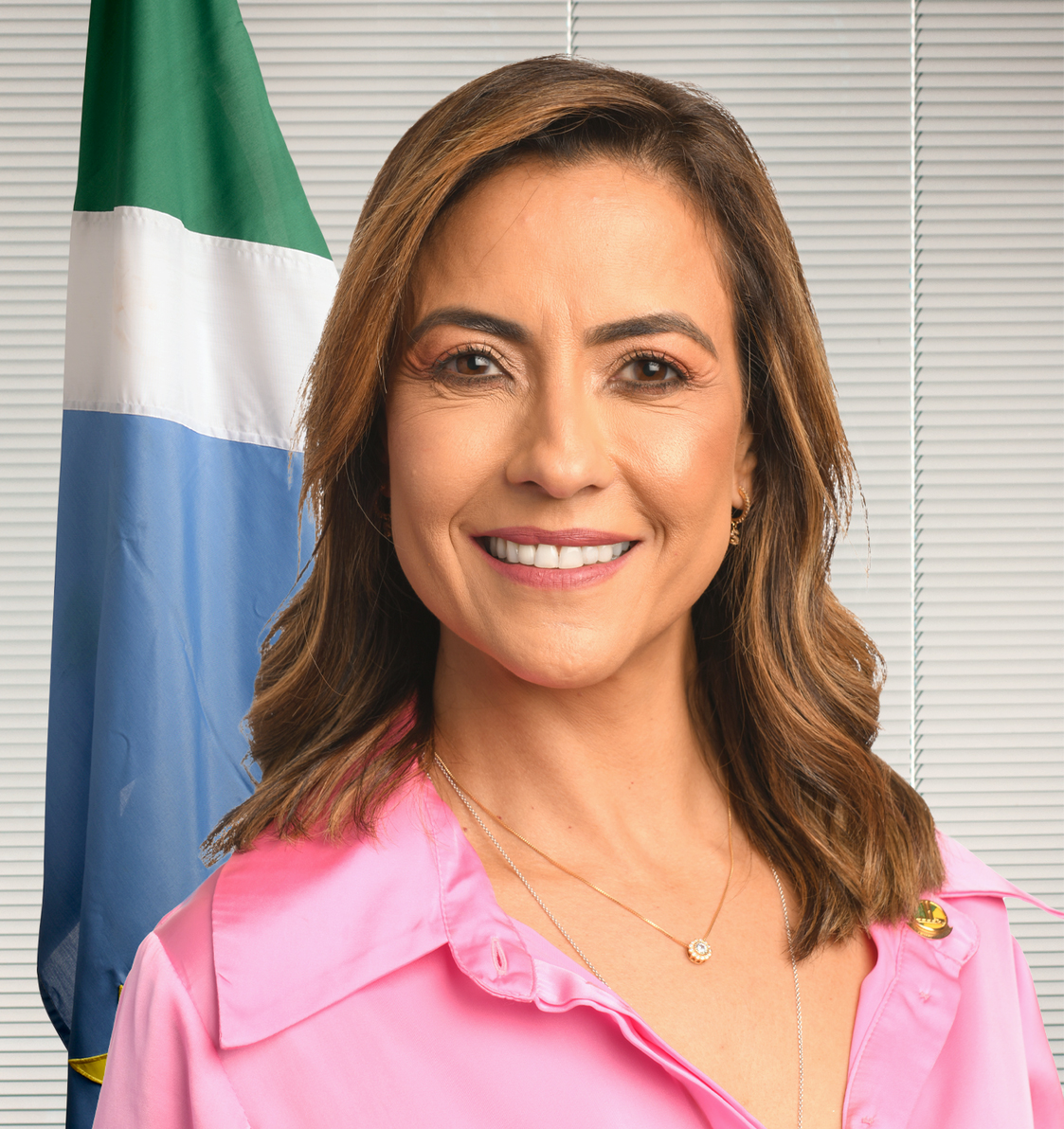
- Official portrait, 2023

Senator for Mato Grosso do Sul
- Incumbent
- Assumed office 1 February 2019

Personal details
- Born: Soraya Vieira Thronicke; 1 June 1973 (age 53) Dourados, Mato Grosso, (Note: Municipality now part of the state of Mato Grosso do Sul.) Brazil
- Party: PSB (since 2026)
- Other political affiliations: NOVO (2017–2018); PSL (2018–2022); UNIÃO (2022–2023); PODE (2023–2026)
- Education: University Center of Campo Grande (LL.B.); Fundação Getúlio Vargas (MBA)
- Profession: Lawyer

Soraya Vieira Thronicke (born 1 June 1973) is a Brazilian politician and lawyer. She has spent her political career representing Mato Grosso do Sul, having served as Senator for that state since 2019.

== Political career ==
In the 2018 Brazilian general election, Thronicke, along with Nelsinho Trad, was elected to the Federal Senate from the state of Mato Grosso do Sul. Thronicke was the only woman on the ballot in the entire state that election year. Strong themes of Thronicke's senate campaign agenda included anti-corruption and encouraging private property.

Ideologically Thronicke identifies as economically liberal and socially conservative. In 2018, she was a supporter of Jair Bolsonaro, and campaigned with him on his run for president. She was a candidate for president in the 2022 election, having been nominated by the Brazil Union party. On 2 October 2022, Thronicke failed to reach the run-off with 0.51% of the vote. She switched parties to Podemos in 2023 and again to the PSB in 2026 for her re-election bid to the Senate.

== Personal life ==
As is common in her home state, Thronicke is of German Brazilian descent. Born in Dourados, Thronicke grew up in Campo Grande. Before becoming a politician Thronicke was a lawyer. She is married and has a son. Thronicke's family owns multiple motels throughout Mato Grosso do Sul.
