= Marcos Cintra =

Brazilian economist and politician

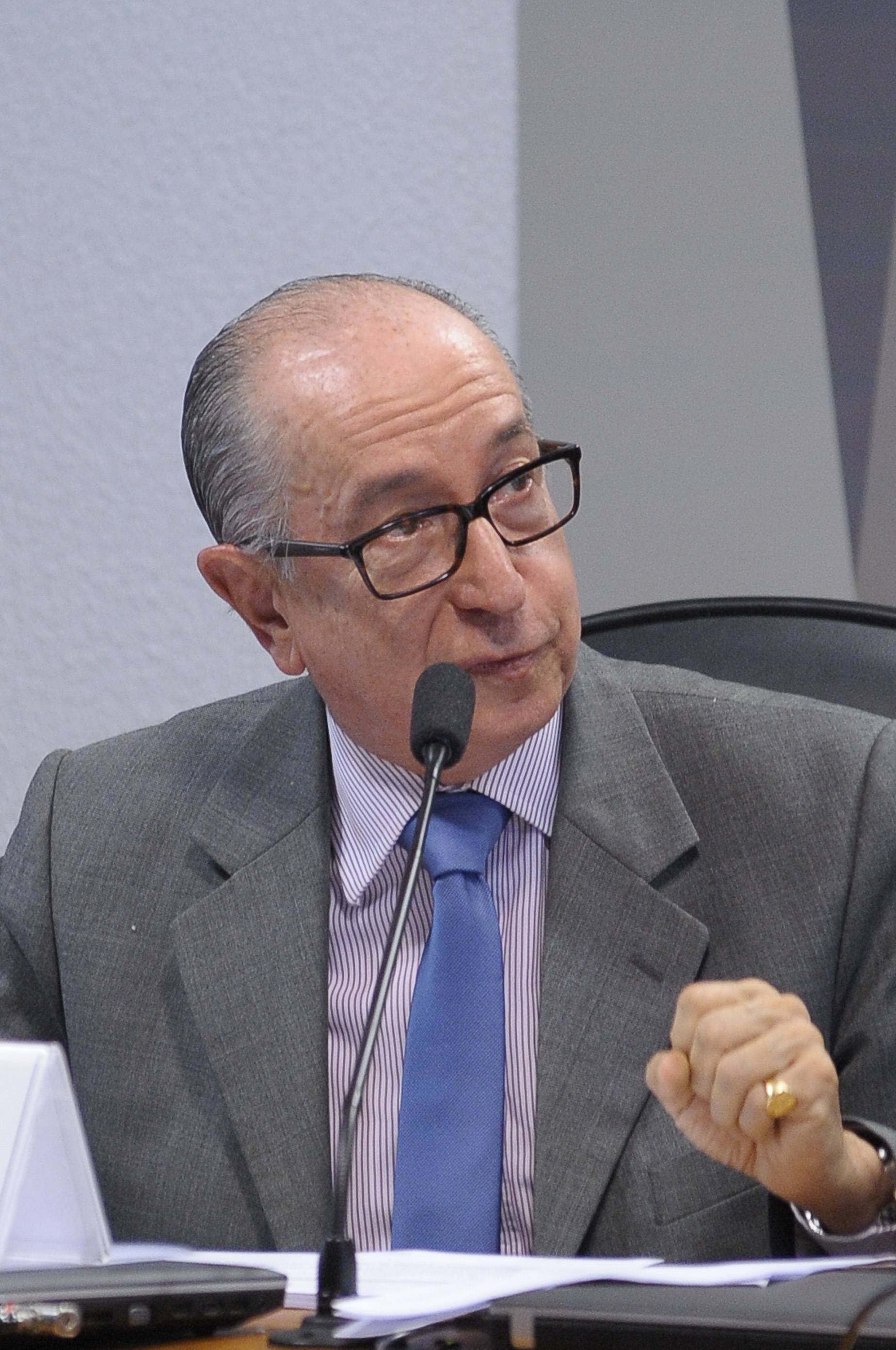

Secretary of the Federal Revenue Service
- In office 2 January 2019 – 11 September 2019
- President: Jair Bolsonaro
- Minister: Paulo Guedes
- Preceded by: Jorge Rachid
- Succeeded by: José de Assis Ferraz Neto

Member of the Chamber of Deputies
- In office 1 February 1999 – 1 February 2003
- Constituency: São Paulo

Member of the Municipal Chamber of São Paulo
- In office 1 January 2009 – 1 January 2013
- In office 1 January 1993 – 1 January 1997
- Constituency: At-large

Personal details
- Born: Marcos Cintra Cavalcanti de Albuquerque; 23 August 1945 (age 81) São Paulo, Brazil
- Party: UNIÃO (2022–present)
- Other political affiliations: See list: ARENA (1966–1979); PDS (1980–1985); PL (1985–2001); PFL (2001–2004); PL (2004–2006); PR (2006–2010); PSD (2011–2013); PRB (2013–2017); PSD (2017–2018); PSL (2018–2022)
- Education: Harvard University
- Profession: Economist

Marcos Cintra Cavalcanti de Albuquerque (born 23 August 1945) is a Brazilian economist and politician affiliated with the Brazil Union (UNIÃO).

Government offices
Preceded by Jorge Rachid	Secretary of the Federal Revenue Service; 2019	Succeeded by José de Assis Ferraz Neto
Party political offices
New political party	UNIÃO nominee for Vice President of Brazil; 2022	Most recent
