= João Barbosa Bravo =

Brazilian economist and politician

João Barbosa Bravo (born 27 June 1947) is a Brazilian economist and politician. He was the Mayor of São Gonçalo, Rio de Janeiro, between 1993 and 1996, by the Democratic Labour Party (PDT).

In the 2022 presidential election, he was candidate for Vice President of Brazil by the Christian Democracy (DC), being the running mate of José Maria Eymael.
