= Brazil Union =

Brazil Union União Brasil
- Abbreviation: UNIÃO
- President: Antônio Rueda
- Secretary-General: ACM Neto
- Founded: 6 October 2021; 5 years ago
- Registered: 8 February 2022; 4 years ago
- Merger of: Democrats; Social Liberal Party
- Membership: 1,085,680
- Ideology: Liberal conservatism; Economic liberalism; Social conservatism
- Political position: Centre-right
- National affiliation: Progressive Union (UPB)
- Regional affiliation: Christian Democrat Organization of America; Union of Latin American Parties
- International affiliation: International Democracy Union
- Colours: Blue; Sky blue Yellow; White
- Slogan: Union, Brazil!
- TSE Identification Number: 44
- Chamber of Deputies: 59 / 513
- Federal Senate: 9 / 81
- Governorships: 3 / 27
- State Assemblies: 129 / 1,024
- Mayors: 552 / 5,570
- City Councillors: 5,546 / 56,810

Website
- uniaobrasil.org.br

The Brazil Union (Portuguese: União Brasil, UNIÃO) is a liberal-conservative political party in Brazil. The party was founded on 6 October 2021 through the merger of the Democrats (DEM), thus tracing its lineage to ARENA, the governing party of Brazil’s military dictatorship, and the Social Liberal Party (PSL). The merger resulted in the biggest party in Brazil, and was approved by Brazil's Superior Electoral Court on 8 February 2022.

The party is generally split on opposition to Jair Bolsonaro and is most often in opposition to the policies of Luiz Inácio Lula da Silva, nominating Soraya Thronicke for president in 2022 Brazilian general election. In 2022, it was reported the party was in talks with the Progressistas to form the largest bloc in Congress. The formation of the alliance, the Progressive Union, was approved in April 2025, making the broader federation, the largest bloc in Congress.

== History ==
=== Prelude to the merger ===
The Democrats was one of the largest parties on the Brazilian right, being the successor of the Liberal Front Party (PFL), which had been founded by a dissident faction of the Democratic Social Party, which in turn had succeeded the ARENA, the governing party of Brazil’s military dictatorship. The PSL had been founded as a social-liberal party, but after the election of Jair Bolsonaro as President, it started to position itself as a more socially conservative and economically liberal party.

In 2017, Constitutional Amendment 97 was enacted, which established a progressive barrier clause, with that Brazilian political parties have free access to radio and television in electoral campaigns, as well as federal funds. Likewise, the amendment prohibited the formation of political coalitions to contest proportional elections. The purpose of the amendment was to reduce the number of political parties in Brazil.

Luciano Bivar and ACM Neto at the convention that officialised the creation of the party

The first news that emerged proposing the merger was at the end of 2019, during the crisis that culminated in the departure of Jair Bolsonaro from the PSL along with many of his core supporters and by the departure of several historical members of DEM, such as mayor of the city of Rio de Janeiro Eduardo Paes, the former president of the Chamber Rodrigo Maia and the vice governor of the state of São Paulo Rodrigo Garcia, in addition to bad election results of PSL in the municipal elections.

At the time, there was opposition, with ACM Neto, president of Democratas, stating that this union would be meaningless and Felipe Francischini, president of the Constitution and Justice Commission in the Chamber of Deputies, saying that the union would make both parties lose space in politics.

Since then, some political parties merged with others. Using this precedent, in 2021, the Social Liberal Party (PSL) and Democrats announced the upcoming merger.

=== Merger formalized and departure of Bolsonaro wing ===
The name along with the TSE number 44 was chosen at the end of September 2021. The merger was agreed upon on 6 October 2021 by an acclamation on a national convention containing representatives from both parties, and was legally approved by the Superior Electoral Court on 8 February 2022.

In the 2018 elections, the predecessor parties (DEM and PSL) elected 81 federal deputies, so that, on the date of the merger, the party had the largest number of members in the Chamber of Deputies. With the merger however, more core Bolsonaro supporters left the party for the Liberal Party and the Progressistas, given that the party wanted to run its own presidential candidate. In April 2022, the party had 46 members in the Chamber of Deputies, ranking fifth among the parties in the House.

=== 2022 general elections ===
Committing to its attempt to nominate a presidential candidate in the 2022 Brazilian general election, the party nominated Soraya Thronicke, a lawyer and senator from Mato Grasso do Sul, as their presidential candidate and Marcos Cintra, an economist and federal deputy for São Paulo, as vice-president. While Thronicke was not elected, the party itself won the gubernatorial race on Amazonas, Goiás, Mato Grosso and Rondônia. On parliamentary elections they also had success, electing 59 Federal Deputies and 7 Senators. One of them was former Operation Car Wash lead judge Sergio Moro, elected as a Senator for Paraná.

=== Lula administration ===
The party accepted three ministry posts in the Lula government. Luciano Bivar announced that the party would not be in opposition to the new government, but neither would be part of the governist base, despite the three ministry posts.

== Ideology ==
Brazil Union is considered a centre-right party. Political scientist Vinícius Vieira describes the merger as being a Brazilian version of liberal parties, focused on capitalizing on the right-wing electorate who have become disillusioned with President Jair Bolsonaro. PSL vice president Junior Bozzella placed the new party as part of the democratic pole and which seeks to avoid political polarization between Luiz Inácio Lula da Silva and Jair Bolsonaro, stating that radical Bolsonaro supporters would have to leave the party.

At the foundation, a manifesto was defined that affirms the political positions of Brazil Union, with its four guidelines:

- The value of democracy as a political system based on tolerance, plurality, respect and dialogue;
- The value of the State as guarantor of the population's basic social rights;
- The value of freedom as a condition for seeking individual fulfillment;
- The value of the family as the mainstay of the person and the basis of society.

The manifesto also defined 44 basic principles of the party. In economics, although advocating fiscal austerity, privatization and tax cuts, the party is against the minimal state, stating that the state has an important role in areas such as education, healthcare, and income transfer programs. On social issues, it positions itself as favorable to the preservation of the Brazilian family and culture, also defending the increase in the participation of women and racial minorities in politics. Furthermore, it states that the existence of climate change is evident and that the government must take immediate action to mitigate this, becoming one of first decidedly pro-business parties to do so.

== Notable members ==
- Clarissa Garotinho, daughter of Anthony Garotinho, former city councilor, and former Federal Deputy for Rio de Janeiro
- ACM Neto, former national president of the Democrats, general secretary of Brazil Union, and former Mayor of Salvador
- Capitão Wagner, military captain, former city councilor for Fortaleza, and Federal Deputy for Ceará
- Fausto Junior, politician, and Federal Deputy for Amazonas
- Davi Alcolumbre, politician, senator for Amapá and President of the Federal Senate

== Election results ==
=== Presidential election ===
Election	Candidate	Running mate	Coalition	First round		Second round		Result
Election	Candidate	Running mate	Coalition	Votes	%	Votes	%	Result
2022	Soraya Thronicke	Marcos Cintra	None	600,953	0.51	–	–	Lost

=== Legislative election ===
Election	Chamber of Deputies				Federal Senate				Status
Election	Votes	%	Seats	+/–	Votes	%	Seats	+/–	Status
2022	10,262,001	9.3	59 / 513	New	5,465,486	7.5	7 / 81	New	Independent
2026	7,876,904	6.9	46 / 513	▼13	7,968,162	3.8	5 / 81	▼2	Independent

Preceded by 43 – GP (PV)	Numbers of Brazilian Official Political Parties; 44 – UNION (UNIÃO)	Succeeded by 45 – BSDP (PSDB)
