= Euclydes Pettersen =

Brazilian politician (born 1984)

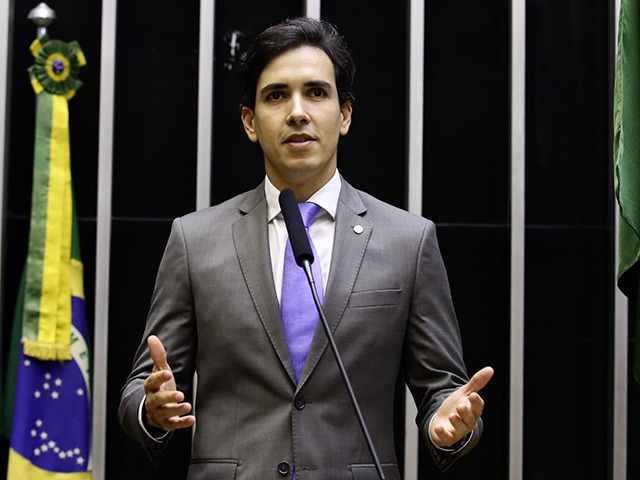
- Pettersen in 2021

Member of the Chamber of Deputies
- Incumbent
- Assumed office 1 February 2019
- Constituency: Minas Gerais

Personal details
- Born: 15 August 1984 (age 42)
- Party: Republicans (since 2022)

Euclydes Marcos Pettersen Neto (born 15 August 1984) is a Brazilian politician serving as a member of the Chamber of Deputies since 2019. From 2009 to 2012, he was a municipal councillor of Governador Valadares.
