= Vinicius Carvalho =

Brazilian politician

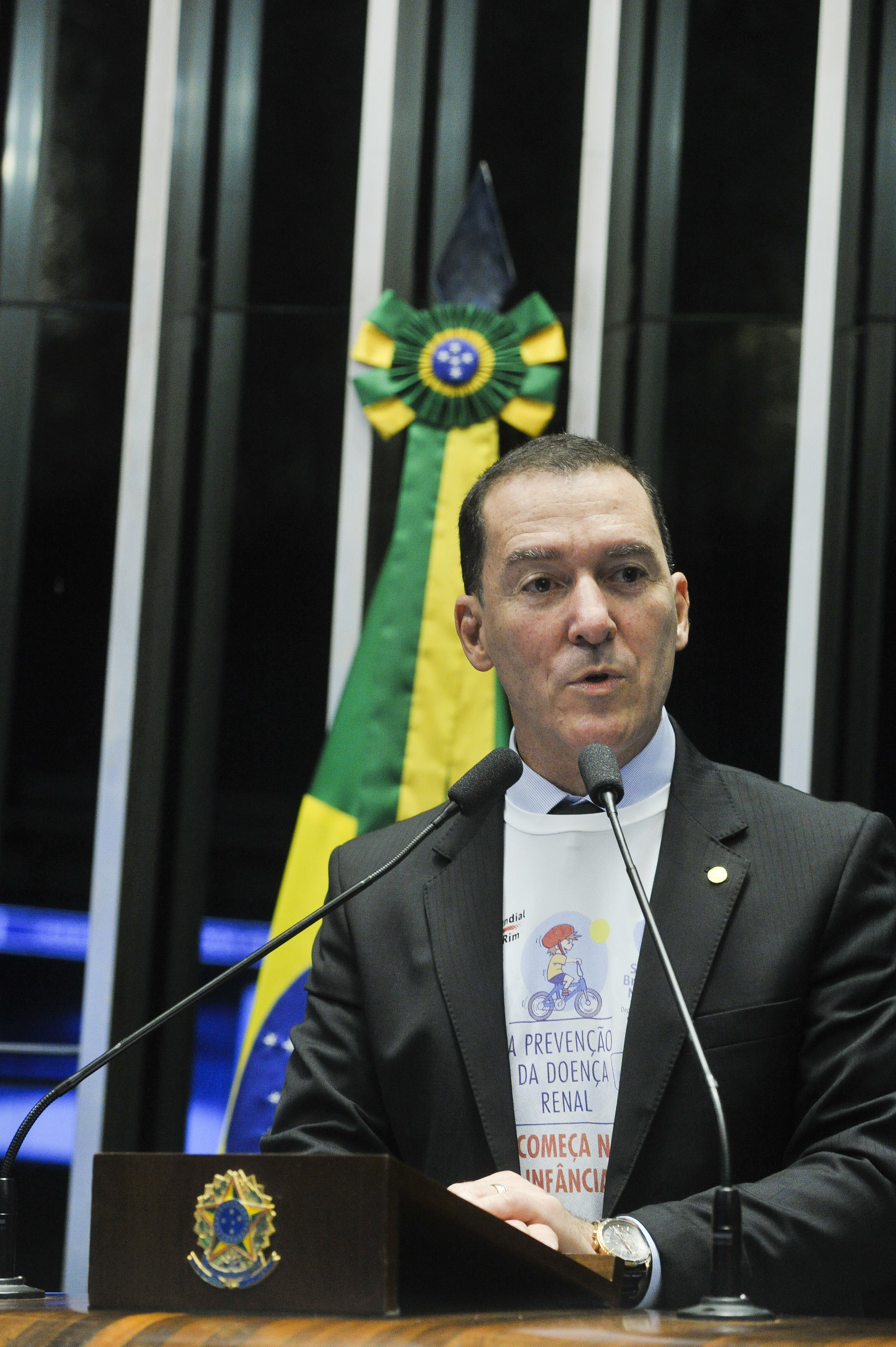
- Carvalho in 2016

Federal Deputy for São Paulo
- Incumbent
- Assumed office 1 February 2014
- In office 1 February 2007 – 31 January 2011

Personal details
- Born: 7 January 1966 (age 60) Rio de Janeiro, Brazil
- Party: PL

Vinicius de Rapozo Carvalho (born 7 January 1966) is a Brazilian politician as well as a lawyer, radio personality, and pastor. Although born in Rio de Janeiro, he has spent his political career representing São Paulo, having served as state representative from 2007 to 2011 and since 2014.

== Personal life ==
Carvalho is originally a lawyer, and is also a pastor of the neo-Pentecostal movement the Universal Church of the Kingdom of God. Carvalho has his own radio show titled "Show da Cidadania" or "Show of Citizenship".

== Political career ==
Carvalho voted in favor of the impeachment against then-president Dilma Rousseff. Carvalho voted in favor of the 2017 Brazilian labor reform, and would later back Rousseff's successor Michel Temer against a similar impeachment motion.

=== Polygamy Bill ===
In late 2016 Carvalho proposed a bill that would make polygamy illegal in Brazil. The same bill regarded marriage as solely between a man and a woman, and would in theory make infidelity and same-sex partnerships illegal.
