= Subdivisions of Brazil =

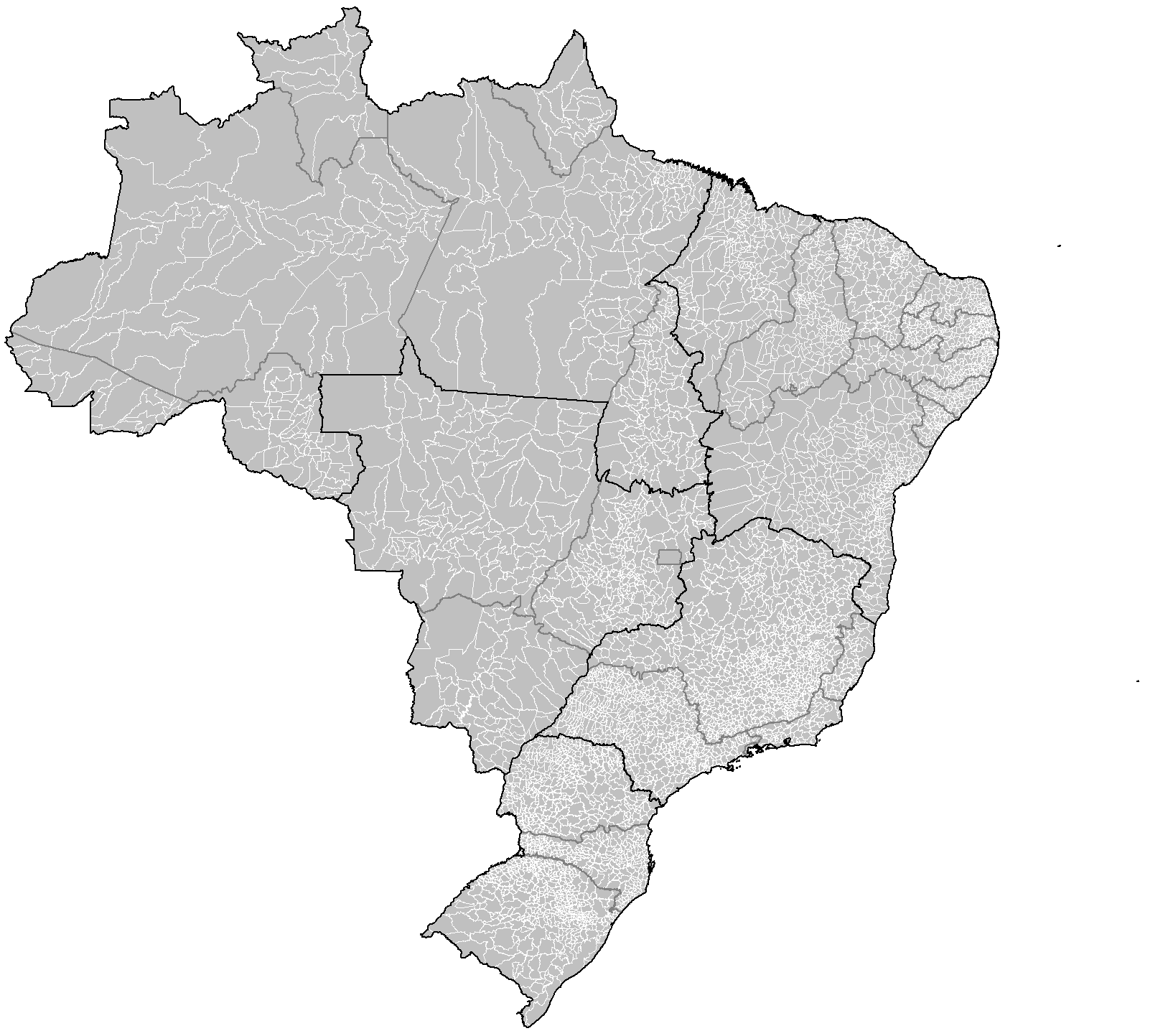
Map of Brazil divided into regions, states, and municipalities

Brazil is divided into several types and levels of subdivisions.

== Regions ==
Since 1942, the Brazilian Institute of Geography and Statistics has divided Brazil into five geographic regions. On 23 November 1970, the regions of Brazil were adjusted slightly to the definition that is still in use today.

- North Region (Região Norte)
- Northeast Region (Região Nordeste)
- Central-West Region (Região Centro-Oeste)
- Southeast Region (Região Sudeste)
- South Region (Região Sul)

== Federative units ==
Brazil is divided into 27 federative units: 26 states and 1 federal district (Distrito Federal).

- Acre (AC)
- Alagoas (AL)
- Amapá (AP)
- Amazonas (AM)
- Bahia (BA)
- Ceará (CE)
- Espírito Santo (ES)
- Goiás (GO)
- Maranhão (MA)
- Mato Grosso (MT)
- Mato Grosso do Sul (MS)
- Minas Gerais (MG)
- Pará (PA)
- Paraíba (PB)
- Paraná (PR)
- Pernambuco (PE)
- Piauí (PI)
- Rio de Janeiro (RJ)
- Rio Grande do Norte (RN)
- Rio Grande do Sul (RS)
- Rondônia (RO)
- Roraima (RR)
- Santa Catarina (SC)
- São Paulo (SP)
- Sergipe (SE)
- Tocantins (TO)
- Distrito Federal (DF)

== Municipalities ==
The lowest level of political division of Brazil are the municipalities, which has some political and economical autonomy. There are 5569 municipalities in Brazil, comprising almost the entirety of the country's territory. The only exceptions are the Federal District (not divided into municipalities, but into 35 administrative regions, without any political autonomy) and the archipelago of Fernando de Noronha, which consists in a state district of Pernambuco.

== Statistical areas ==
For statistical purposes, Brazilian states and the Federal District are divided into "Intermediate Geographic Regions" (Portuguese: Regiões Geográficas Intermediárias), which themselves are divided into smaller "Immediate Geographic Regions" (Regiões Geográficas Imediatas), which correspond to a metropolitan area. In 1989–2017, they were grouped into mesoregions and microregions.

== See also ==
- ISO 3166-2:BR
- Proposed states and territories of Brazil
- Former subdivisions of Brazil
- Indigenous territories
