= Igor Timo =

Brazilian politician (born 1982)

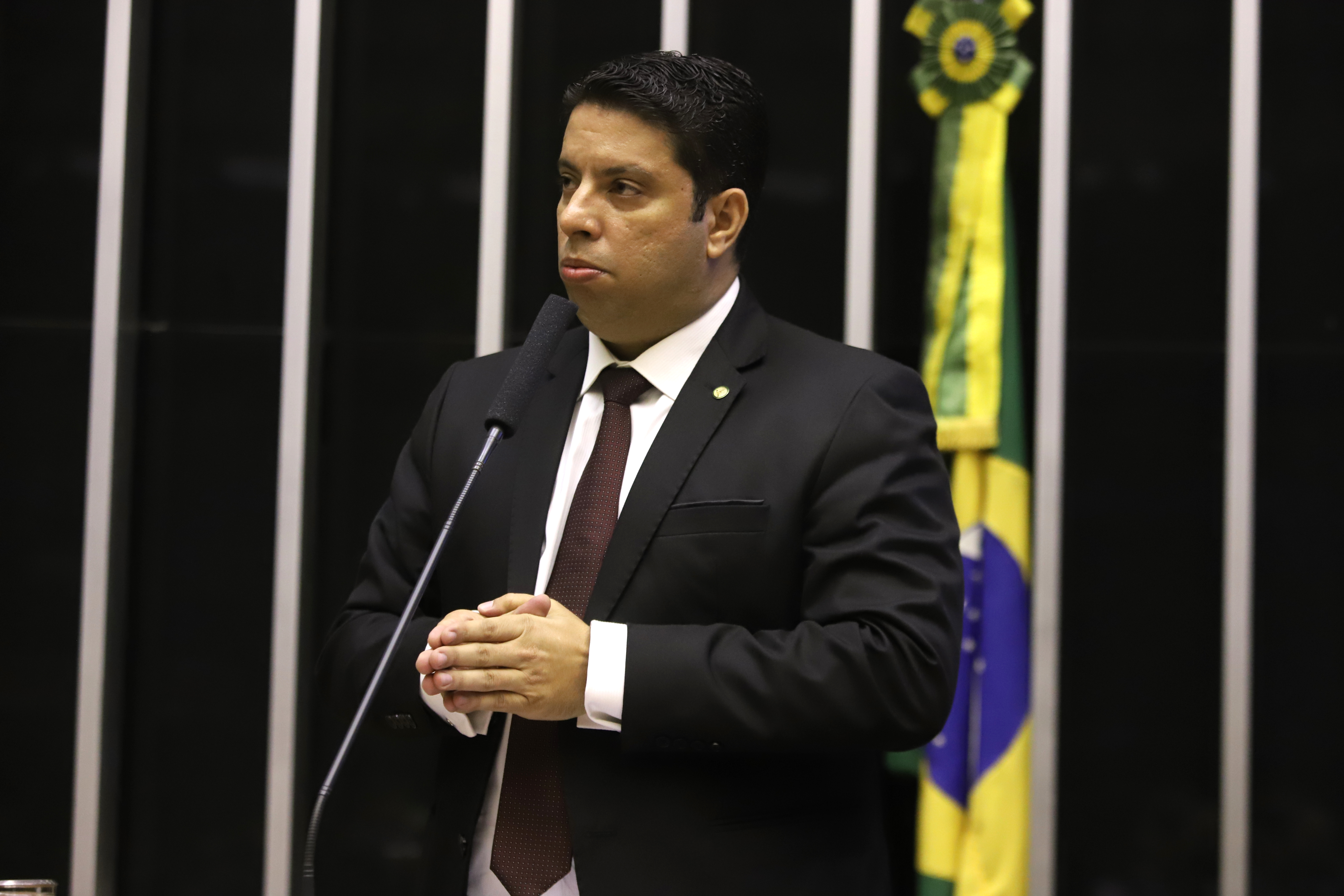
- Timo in 2021

Member of the Chamber of Deputies
- Incumbent
- Assumed office 1 February 2019
- Constituency: Minas Gerais

Personal details
- Born: 10 April 1982 (age 44)
- Party: Social Democratic Party (since 2024)

Igor Tarciano Timo (born 10 April 1982) is a Brazilian politician serving as a member of the Chamber of Deputies since 2019. He has been a member of the Social Democratic Party since 2024.
