= Weliton Prado =

Brazilian politician (born 1975)

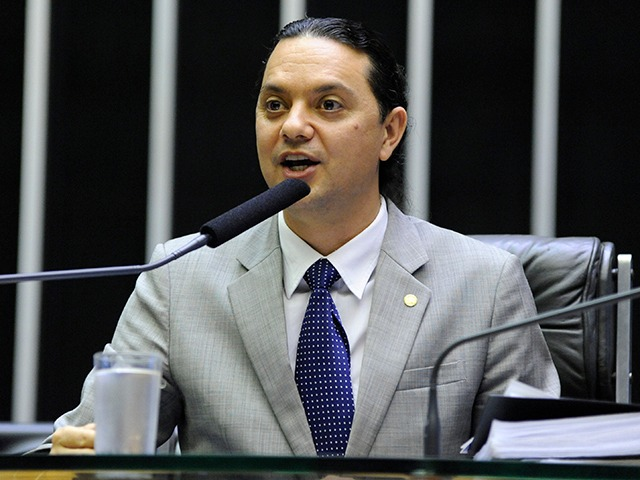
- Prado in 2021

Member of the Chamber of Deputies
- Incumbent
- Assumed office 1 February 2011
- Constituency: Minas Gerais

Personal details
- Born: 24 August 1975 (age 50)
- Party: Solidarity (since 2023)

Weliton Fernandes Prado (born 24 August 1975) is a Brazilian politician serving as a member of the Chamber of Deputies since 2011. From 2003 to 2011, he was a member of the Legislative Assembly of Minas Gerais.
