= Conscription in Brazil =

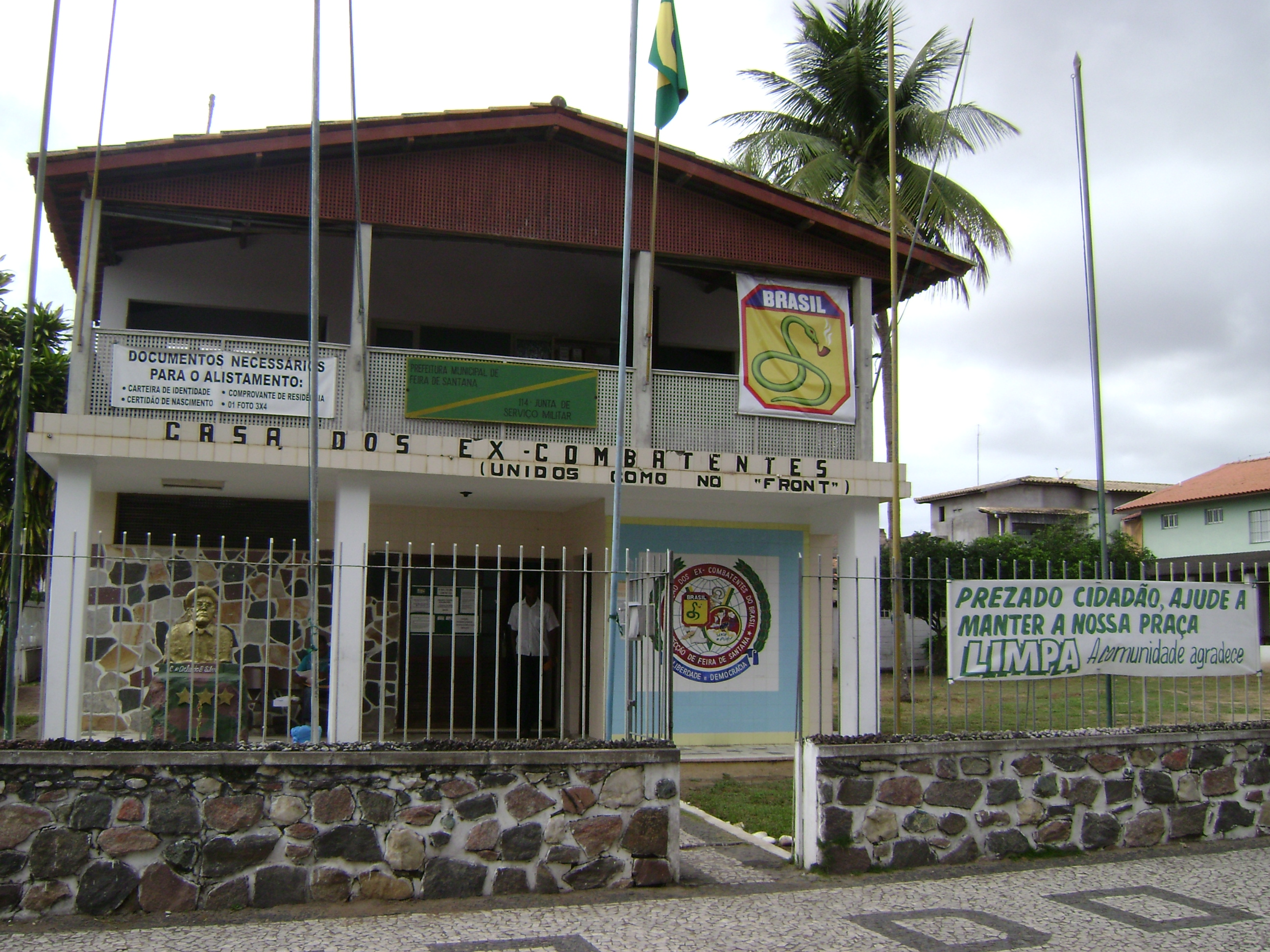
A military service junta in Feira de Santana, where 18-year-old male citizens must enlist for conscription.

In Brazil, conscription is mandatory for every male who has turned 18 years old and normally lasts for twelve months. In practice, however, people are not forced to serve against their will as many exemptions apply.

Military service was first made mandatory in 1906, during Afonso Pena's government, when Hermes da Fonseca was Minister of War. It would only be fully implemented during World War I though, when military personnel in the country were made necessary.

Conscription in Brazil is currently regulated by the Lei do Serviço Militar (Military Service Act), created on August 17, 1964, by then-military-dictator Castelo Branco. According to the law, every male is subjected to military service from January 1 of the year in which he turns 18 until December 31 of the year in which he turns 45. In case of a war, this period may be altered, according to the demands. Seventeen-year-olds are allowed to undergo military service, as volunteers.

Men must enlist for conscription in the year they turn 18. If a citizen is exempted, or if he has finished his military service, he is given one of the following documents: Certificado de Alistamento (commonly known as CAM); Certificado de Reservista; Certificado de Isenção; or Certificado de Dispensa de Incorporação. Without these documents, he won't be able to obtain a Brazilian passport, enroll in any educational institution nor be admitted as an employee in any company whose operations depend on the authorization of federal, state or municipal governments.
