= Opinion polling for the 2022 Brazilian presidential election =

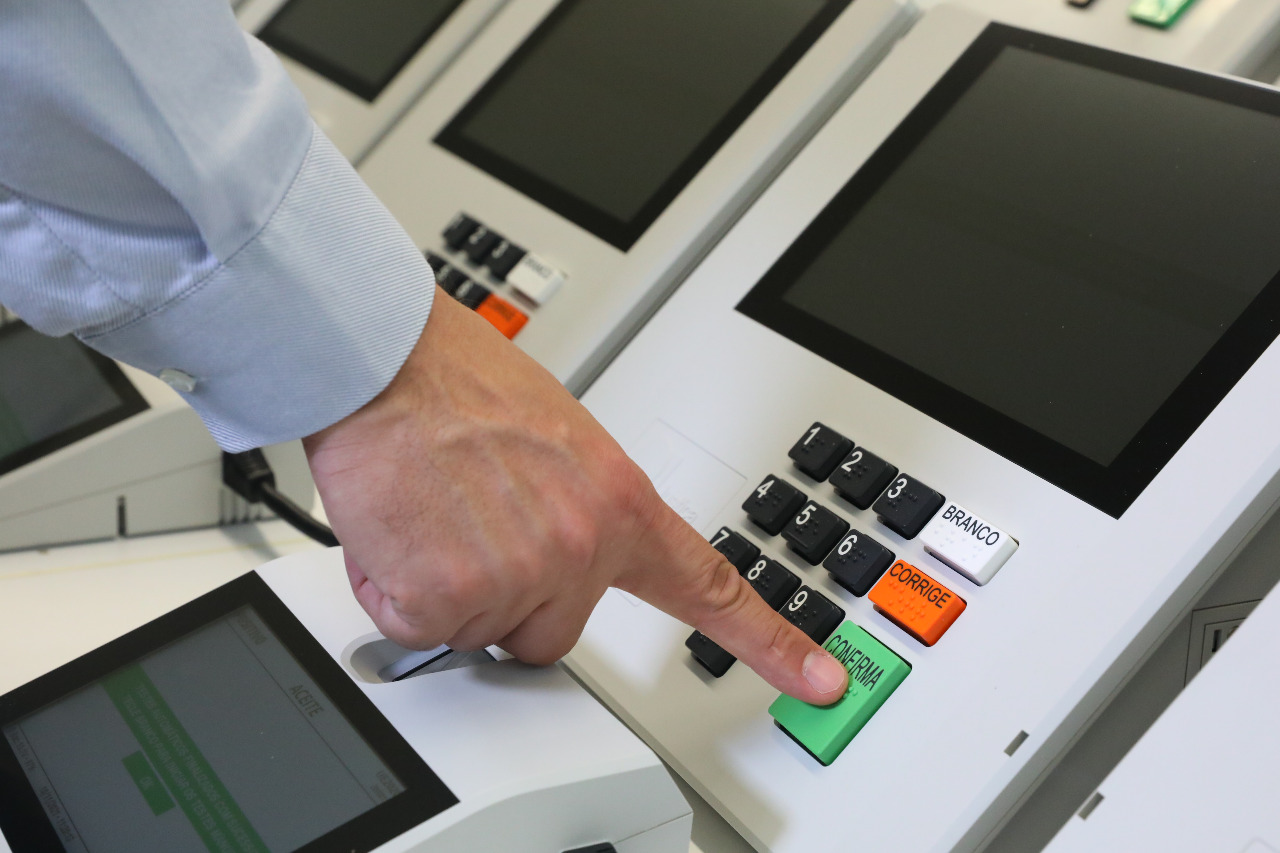
A Brazilian direct-recording electronic voting machine

Since the 2018 Brazilian general election, polling companies have published surveys tracking voting intention for the next election. The results of these surveys are listed below in reverse chronological order and include candidates who frequently polled above 3%.

The first round of the 2022 Brazilian general election took place on 2 October. As no candidate reached a majority of the votes, a second round was held on 30 October.

== First round ==
The first round took place on 2 October 2022.

=== Chart ===
Local regression of polls conducted

=== Polling aggregation ===
Aggregator	Last update	Bolsonaro PL	Lula PT	Gomes PDT	Tebet MDB	Others (Note: This column presents the sum of candidates who do not reach 3% frequently.)	Blank/Null/ Undec.	Lead
The Economist	1 Oct 2022	38%	51%	5%	6%	(N/A)	(N/A)	Lula +13
Veja	1 Oct 2022	33.7%	44.7%	6.8%	4.7%	(N/A)	(N/A)	Lula +11.0
Estadão	1 Oct 2022	33%	47%	5%	6%	2%	7%	Lula +14
CNN Brasil	1 Oct 2022	34%	48%	5%	6%	2%	6%	Lula +14
PollingData	1 Oct 2022	37.5%	43.7%	5.1%	5.3%	1.9%	6.5%	Lula +6.2
El País	1 Oct 2022	35.3%	46.7%	6.0%	4.9%	(N/A)	(N/A)	Lula +11.4
El Electoral	1 Oct 2022	38.5%	48.5%	5.5%	5.0%	(N/A)	(N/A)	Lula +10.0
Pollstergraph	1 Oct 2022	37.1%	44.8%	5.6%	4.7%	(N/A)	(N/A)	Lula +7.7

=== 2022 ===
==== Jul–Oct ====
Publisher/Pollster	Polling period	Sample size	Bolsonaro PL	Lula PT	Gomes PDT	Tebet MDB	Others	Blank/Null/ Undec.	Lead
Results	2 Oct	Valid votes	43.2%	48.4%	3.0%	4.2%	1.2%	(N/A)	5.2%
Results	2 Oct	Total votes	41.3%	46.3%	2.9%	3.9%	1.1%	4.4%	5.0%
Datafolha	30 Sep – 1 Oct	12,800	34%	48%	5%	6%	2%	5%	14%
IPEC	29 Sep – 1 Oct	3,008	34%	47%	5%	5%	2%	7%	13%
Abrapel/Ipespe	30 Sep	1,100	33%	46%	7%	6%	1%	4%	13%
Atlas	28–30 Sep	4,500	40.7%	49.8%	3.9%	2.6%	1.8%	1%	9.1%
CNT/MDA	28–30 Sep	2,002	36.3%	44.2%	4.5%	4.3%	2.2%	8.5%	7.9%
29 Sep			Third presidential debate.						
Datafolha	27–29 Sep	6,800	34%	48%	6%	5%	1.2%	4%	14%
Atlas	24–28 Sep	4,500	39.9%	49.3%	3.5%	2.5%	1.9%	2.7%	9.4%
Exame/Ideia	23–28 Sep	1,500	37%	47%	6%	5%	1.2%	4%	10%
Genial/Quaest	24–27 Sep	2,000	33%	46%	6%	5%	1%	9%	13%
Atlas	22–26 Sep	4,500	41%	48.3%	3.5%	2.1%	2.7%	2.3%	7.3%
Ipec	25–26 Sep	3,008	31%	48%	6%	5%	2%	8%	17%
BTG Pactual/FSB	23–25 Sep	2,000	35%	45%	7%	4%	2%	6%	10%
24 Sep			Second presidential debate. Lula did not attend.						
Abrapel/Ipespe	21–23 Sep	1,100	35%	46%	6%	4%	0%	9%	11%
Datafolha	20–22 Sep	6,754	33%	47%	7%	5%	1%	6%	14%
XP/Ipespe	19–21 Sep	2,000	35%	46%	7%	4%	1%	7%	11%
PoderData	18–20 Sep	3,500	37%	44%	7%	4%	2%	5%	7%
Genial/Quaest	17–20 Sep	2,000	34%	44%	6%	5%	1%	10%	10%
Arko/Atlas	16–20 Sep	7,514	38.6%	48.4%	6.3%	4.0%	1.8%	1%	9.8%
Ipec	17–18 Sep	3,008	31%	47%	7%	5%	1%	9%	16%
BTG/FSB	16–18 Sep	2,000	35%	44%	7%	5%	1%	7%	9%
Abrapel/Ipespe	14–16 Sep	1,100	35%	45%	7%	5%	2%	5%	10%
Datafolha	13–15 Sep	5,926	33%	45%	8%	5%	2%	6%	12%
PoderData	11–13 Sep	3,500	37%	43%	8%	5%	1%	5%	6%
Genial/Quaest	10–13 Sep	2,000	34%	42%	7%	4%	2%	11%	8%
Globo/Ipec	9–11 Sep	2,512	31%	46%	7%	4%	2%	10%	15%
BTG/FSB	9–11 Sep	2,000	35%	41%	9%	7%	2%	6%	6%
Datafolha	8–9 Sep	2,676	34%	45%	7%	5%	1%	7%	11%
Abrapel/Ipespe	7–9 Sep	1,100	36%	44%	8%	5%	2%	5%	8%
BTG/FSB	2–4 Sep	2,000	34%	42%	8%	6%	3%	7%	8%
Globo/Ipec	2–4 Sep	2,512	31%	44%	8%	4%	2%	11%	13%
Genial/Quaest	1–4 Sep	2,000	34%	44%	7%	4%	2%	9%	10%
Abrapel/Ipespe	30 Aug – 1 Sep	1,100	35%	44%	9%	5%	2%	5%	9%
Datafolha	30 Aug – 1 Sep	5,734	32%	45%	9%	5%	3%	6%	13%
PoderData	28–30 Aug	3,500	36%	44%	8%	4%	1%	5%	8%
Paraná Pesquisas	26–30 Aug	2,020	37.1%	41.3%	7.7%	2.4%	1.6%	9.9%	4.2%
XP/Ipespe	26–29 Aug	2,000	35%	43%	9%	5%	1%	6%	8%
28 Aug			First presidential debate.						
BTG/FSB	26–28 Aug	2,000	36%	43%	9%	4%	2%	7%	7%
Ipec	26–28 Aug	2,000	32%	44%	7%	3%	1%	13%	12%
Quaest	25–28 Aug	2,000	32%	44%	8%	3%	2%	11%	12%
CNT/MDA	25–28 Aug	2,002	34.1%	42.3%	7.3%	2.1%	1.1%	12.8%	8.2%
26 Aug			Beginning of the period allowed for political advertisement on television and radio.						
Atlas	20–25 Aug	7,475	38.3%	46.7%	6.4%	3.6%	3.1%	1.9%	8.4%
Exame/Ideia	19–24 Aug	1,500	36%	44%	9%	4%	3.6%	5%	8%
Paraná Pesquisas	19–23 Aug	2,020	37%	41.7%	7.3%	2.7%	1%	10.1%	4.7%
BTG/FSB	19–21 Aug	2,000	36%	45%	6%	3%	2%	9%	9%
Datafolha	16–18 Aug	5,744	32%	47%	7%	2%	1%	8%	15%
16 Aug			Official beginning of the election campaign.						
PoderData	14–16 Aug	3,500	37%	44%	6%	4%	1%	7%	7%
IPEC	12–14 Aug	2,000	32%	44%	6%	2%	1%	15%	12%
FSB Comunicação	12–14 Aug	2,000	34%	45%	8%	2%	3%	8%	11%
Quaest/Genial	11–14 Aug	2,000	33%	45%	6%	3%	1%	12%	12%
FSB Comunicação	5–7 Aug	2,000	34%	41%	7%	3%	4%	11%	7%
5 Aug			Brazil Union formally launches the candidacy of senator Soraya Thronicke.						
4 Aug			André Janones (Avante) withdraws his candidacy; endorses Lula.						
PoderData	31 Jul – 2 Aug	3,500	35%	43%	7%	4%	4%	6%	8%
Paraná Pesquisas	28 Jul – 1 Aug	2,020	35.6%	41.1%	7.9%	1.8%	3.3%	10.3%	5.5%
31 Jul			Congressman Luciano Bivar (Brazil Union) withdraws his candidacy.						
Quaest/Genial	28–31 Jul	2,000	32%	44%	5%	2%	5%	12%	12%
Datafolha	27–28 Jul	2,566	29%	47%	8%	2%	5%	9%	18%
BTG/FSB	22–24 Jul	2,000	31%	44%	9%	2%	4%	10%	13%
XP/Ipespe	20–22 Jul	2,000	35%	44%	9%	4%	2%	6%	9%
20 Jul			Beginning of the period for the realization of party conventions.						
Exame/Ideia	15–20 Jul	1,500	33%	44%	8%	4%	4%	7%	11%
PoderData	17–19 Jul	3,000	37%	43%	6%	3%	3%	8%	6%
BTG/FSB	8–10 Jul	2,000	32%	41%	9%	4%	6%	8%	9%
BTG/FSB	8–10 Jul	2,000	32%	42%	9%	4%	4%	9%	10%
PoderData	3–5 Jul	3,000	36%	44%	5%	3%	3%	9%	8%
Quaest/Genial	29 Jun – 2 Jul	2,000	31%	45%	6%	2%	4%	12%	14%
Quaest/Genial	29 Jun – 2 Jul	2,000	31%	45%	7%	3%	3%	11%	14%
Quaest/Genial	29 Jun – 2 Jul	2,000	31%	47%	8%	3%	0%	12%	16%

==== Apr–Jun ====
Publisher/Pollster	Polling period	Sample size	Bolsonaro PL	Lula PT	Gomes PDT	Doria PSDB	Others	Blank/Null/ Undec.	Lead
BTG/FSB	24–26 Jun	2,000	33%	43%	8%	—N/a	7%	9%	10%
Modalmais/Futura	20–24 Jun	2,000	37.6%	38.9%	7.3%	—N/a	5.1%	11%	1.3%
Datafolha	22–23 Jun	2,556	28%	47%	8%	—N/a	5%	11%	19%
Exame/Ideia	17–22 Jun	1,500	36%	45%	7%	—N/a	6%	7%	9%
PoderData	19–21 Jun	3,000	34%	44%	6%	—N/a	5%	9%	10%
BTG/FSB	10–12 Jun	2,000	32%	44%	9%	—N/a	4%	8%	12%
PoderData	5–7 Jun	3,000	35%	43%	6%	—N/a	5%	10%	8%
Quaest/Genial	2–5 Jun	2,000	30%	46%	7%	—N/a	4%	13%	16%
Quaest/Genial	2–5 Jun	2,000	29%	47%	9%	—N/a	3%	12%	18%
Quaest/Genial	2–5 Jun	2,000	30%	48%	9%	—N/a	3%	11%	18%
Instituto GERP	30 May – 3 Jun	2,095	37%	39%	8%	—N/a	6%	10%	2%
Instituto GERP	30 May – 3 Jun	2,095	37%	39%	7%	—N/a	8%	9%	2%
XP/Ipespe	30 May – 1 Jun	1,000	34%	45%	9%	—N/a	6%	7%	11%
Paraná Pesquisas	26–30 May	2,020	35.3%	41.4%	7.7%	—N/a	5.4%	10.1%	6.1%
BTG/FSB	27–29 May	2,000	32%	46%	9%	—N/a	3%	8%	14%
Datafolha	25–26 May	2,556	27%	48%	7%	—N/a	6%	11%	21%
XP/Ipespe	23–25 May	1,000	34%	45%	8%	—N/a	7%	5%	11%
CNN Brasil/Real Time Big Data	23–24 May	3,000	32%	40%	9%	—N/a	5%	13%	8%
PoderData	22–24 May	3,000	35%	43%	5%	1%	7%	10%	8%
23 May			Facing pressure from within his own party, João Doria, former governor of São Paulo, withdraws his candidacy.						
Modalmais/Futura	16–19 May	2,000	36%	41%	5.6%	2.5%	4.1%	10.8%	5%
Exame/Ideia	14–19 May	1,500	32%	41%	9%	2%	5.2%	12%	9%
Exame/Ideia	14–19 May	1,500	33%	40%	8%	—	6.9%	14%	7%
XP/Ipespe	16–18 May	1,000	32%	44%	8%	4%	4%	8%	12%
XP/Ipespe	9–11 May	1,000	32%	44%	8%	3%	3%	10%	12%
PoderData	8–10 May	3,000	35%	42%	5%	4%	5%	9%	7%
PoderData	8–10 May	3,000	35%	42%	7%	5%	5%	7%	7%
Quaest/Genial	5–8 May	2,000	29%	46%	7%	3%	5%	9%	17%
Quaest/Genial	5–8 May	2,000	31%	46%	9%	4%	—N/a	10%	15%
Quaest/Genial	5–8 May	2,000	33%	50%	—N/a	5%	—N/a	12%	17%
Quaest/Genial	5–8 May	2,000	33%	48%	10%	—N/a	—N/a	10%	15%
7 May			Former President Lula formally launches his candidacy.						
CNT/MDA	4–7 May	2,002	32%	40.6%	7.1%	3.1%	5.1%	12.1%	8.6%
XP/Ipespe	2–4 May	1,000	31%	44%	8%	3%	4%	10%	13%
Paraná Pesquisas	28 Apr – 3 May	2,020	35.2%	40%	7.4%	3.2%	3.4%	10.7%	4.8%
Paraná Pesquisas	28 Apr – 3 May	2,020	35.7%	42.6%	—N/a	4.9%	4%	12.8%	6.9%
PoderData	24–26 Apr	3,000	36%	41%	6%	4%	5%	7%	5%
BTG/FSB	22–24 Apr	2,000	32%	41%	9%	3%	5%	9%	9%
XP/Ipespe	18–20 Apr	1,000	31%	45%	8%	3%	4%	10%	14%
Exame/Ideia	15–20 Apr	1,500	33%	42%	10%	3%	5%	7%	9%
14 Apr			Brazil Union announces the candidacy of congressman Luciano Bivar.						
13 Apr			Workers' Party national committee formally approves Geraldo Alckmin as Lula's running mate.						
PoderData	10–12 Apr	3,000	35%	40%	5%	3%	6%	11%	5%
XP/Ipespe	2–5 Apr	1,000	30%	44%	9%	3%	3%	12%	14%
Paraná Pesquisas	31 Mar – 5 Apr	2,020	35.3%	41.5%	5.8%	3.1%	1.2%	13.1%	6.2%
Quaest/Genial	1–3 Apr	2,000	31%	45%	6%	2%	4%	12%	14%

==== Jan–Mar ====
Publisher/Pollster	Polling period	Sample size	Bolsonaro PL	Lula PT	Moro PODE	Gomes PDT	Doria PSDB	Others	Blank/Null/ Undec.	Lead
Instituto GERP	31 Mar – 5 Apr	2,095	35%	37%	6%	5%	1%	2%	7%	2%
31 Mar			Former Minister Moro leaves Podemos and joins Brazil Union, suspending his candidacy.							
PoderData	27–29 Mar	3,000	32%	41%	6%	7%	3%	4%	7%	9%
Modalmais/Futura	21–25 Mar	2,000	35.5%	38.5%	5.3%	5.1%	1.3%	4.8%	9.4%	3%
Datafolha	22–23 Mar	2,556	26%	43%	8%	6%	2%	5%	8%	17%
Datafolha	22–23 Mar	2,556	26%	43%	8%	7%	—N/a	6%	10%	17%
Datafolha	22–23 Mar	2,556	26%	44%	8%	7%	2%	5%	8%	18%
Datafolha	22–23 Mar	2,556	26%	43%	8%	8%	—N/a	5%	9%	17%
XP/Ipespe	21–23 Mar	1,000	26%	44%	9%	7%	2%	4%	9%	18%
Exame/Ideia	18–23 Mar	1,500	29%	40%	9%	9%	1%	5%	6%	11%
FSB	18–20 Mar	2,000	29%	43%	8%	9%	2%	5%	5%	14%
PoderData	13–15 Mar	3,000	30%	40%	7%	7%	2%	6%	8%	10%
Quaest/Genial	10–13 Mar	2,000	26%	44%	7%	7%	2%	3%	13%	18%
Quaest/Genial	10–13 Mar	2,000	25%	45%	6%	7%	2%	4%	10%	20%
Quaest/Genial	10–13 Mar	2,000	28%	48%	—N/a	8%	—N/a	3%	12%	20%
Ranking Brasil	7–12 Mar	3,000	32.4%	39%	7.2%	6.5%	2.4%	—N/a	10.5%	6.6%
Instituto GERP	7–10 Mar	2,095	31%	38%	7%	5%	2%	1%	8%	7%
9 Mar			Senator Rodrigo Pacheco (PSD) announces he will not run for president.							
XP/Ipespe	7–9 Mar	1,000	28%	43%	8%	8%	3%	3%	9%	15%
Paraná Pesquisas	3–8 Mar	2,020	30.9%	38.9%	7.4%	6.8%	2.2%	2.5%	11.2%	8%
PoderData	27 Feb – 1 Mar	3,000	32%	40%	6%	7%	2%	6%	8%	8%
Ipespe	21–23 Feb	1,000	26%	43%	8%	7%	3%	4%	9%	17%
Exame/Ideia	18–22 Feb	1,500	27%	42%	10%	8%	3%	3.7%	6%	15%
CNT/MDA	16–19 Feb	2,002	28%	42.2%	6.4%	6.7%	1.8%	2.7%	12.2%	14.2%
Modalmais/Futura	14–17 Feb	2,000	34.7%	35%	7.5%	5.8%	1.8%	4.5%	10.5%	0.3%
PoderData	13–15 Feb	3,000	31%	40%	9%	4%	3%	4%	8%	9%
XP/Ipespe	7–9 Feb	1,000	25%	43%	8%	8%	3%	2%	12%	18%
Quaest/Genial	3–6 Feb	2,000	23%	45%	7%	7%	2%	3%	13%	22%
Paraná Pesquisas	27 Jan – 1 Feb	2,020	29.1%	40.1%	10.1%	5.6%	2.4%	2.4%	10.3%	11%
PoderData	31 Jan – 1 Feb	3,000	30%	41%	7%	7%	2%	5%	8%	11%
XP/Ipespe	24–25 Jan	1,000	24%	44%	8%	8%	2%	3%	12%	20%
Modalmais/Futura	17–21 Jan	2,000	33.2%	39.5%	8.4%	7.5%	3.2%	—N/a	8.2%	6.3%
PoderData	16–18 Jan	3,000	28%	42%	8%	3%	2%	4%	12%	14%
Exame/Ideia	9–13 Jan	1,500	24%	41%	11%	7%	4%	1%	11%	17%
XP/Ipespe	10–12 Jan	1,000	24%	44%	9%	7%	2%	3%	13%	20%
Quaest/Genial	6–9 Jan	2,000	23%	45%	9%	5%	3%	1%	12%	22%

=== 2021 ===
Publisher/Pollster	Polling period	Sample size	Bolsonaro PL	Lula PT	Moro PODE	Gomes PDT	Doria PSDB	Mandetta UNION	Pacheco PSD	Tebet MDB	Others	Blank/Null/ Undec.	Lead
PoderData	19–21 Dec	3,000	30%	40%	7%	4%	4%	—N/a	—N/a	1%	3%	11%	10%
Ipespe	14–16 Dec	1,000	24%	44%	9%	7%	3%	—N/a	1%	—N/a	1%	12%	20%
Ipespe	14–16 Dec	1,000	23%	43%	9%	7%	3%	—N/a	—N/a	1%	2%	9%	20%
Datafolha	13–16 Dec	3,666	22%	48%	9%	7%	4%	—N/a	—N/a	—N/a	—N/a	10%	26%
Ipec	9–13 Dec	2,002	22%	49%	8%	5%	3%	—N/a	—N/a	—N/a	—N/a	13%	27%
Ipec	9–13 Dec	2,002	21%	48%	6%	5%	2%	—N/a	—N/a	1%	3%	14%	27%
Exame/Ideia	6–9 Dec	1,200	27%	37%	10%	6%	4%	—N/a	1%	—N/a	2%	10%	10%
Publisher/Pollster	Polling period	Sample size	Bolsonaro PL	Lula PT	Moro PODE	Gomes PDT	Doria PSDB	Leite PSDB	Mandetta UNION	Pacheco PSD	Others (Note: TV presenter José Luiz Datena withdrew candidacy in November 2021, to run for a Senate seat. Polls with his name are now added to the column "Others".)	Blank/Null/ Undec.	Lead
8 Dec			MDB confirms the candidacy of senator Simone Tebet.										
Quaest/Genial	2–5 Dec	2,037	23%	46%	10%	5%	2%	—N/a	—N/a	1%	1%	11%	23%
30 Nov			President Bolsonaro joins the Liberal Party.										
Atlas Político	27–29 Nov	4,401	31.5%	42.8%	13.7%	6.1%	1.7%	—N/a	—N/a	0.9%	0.1%	3.2%	11.3%
27 Nov			Governor of São Paulo João Doria wins the PSDB presidential primary.										
Ipespe	22–24 Nov	1,000	25%	42%	11%	9%	2%	—N/a	1%	1%	1%	3%	17%
Ipespe	22–24 Nov	1,000	24%	42%	11%	9%	—N/a	2%	—N/a	2%	1%	8%	18%
PoderData	22–24 Nov	2,500	29%	34%	8%	7%	5%	—N/a	3%	—N/a	4%	9%	5%
PoderData	22–24 Nov	2,500	27%	36%	8%	9%	—N/a	5%	2%	—N/a	3%	8%	9%
Futura/ModalMais	16–20 Nov	2,000	30.8%	37%	13.6%	7.5%	1.9%	—N/a	—N/a	—N/a	2.1%	7.1%	6.2%
Paraná Pesquisas	16–19 Nov	2,020	29.2%	34.9%	10.7%	6.1%	3.1%	—N/a	1.2%	0.4%	1.6%	13.4%	5.7%
Paraná Pesquisas	16–19 Nov	2,020	29.8%	35.1%	11%	6.1%	—N/a	1.6%	—N/a	0.6%	1.2%	13.6%	5.3%
Ponteio Política	16–18 Nov	1,000	—N/a	37%	18%	11%	3%	—N/a	—N/a	—N/a	—N/a	31%	19%
Ponteio Política	16–18 Nov	1,000	24%	37%	11%	8%	3%	—N/a	—N/a	—N/a	—N/a	17%	13%
Exame/Ideia	9–11 Nov	1,200	25%	35%	5%	7%	2%	2%	1%	1%	2%	20%	10%
Quaest/Genial	3–6 Nov	2,063	21%	48%	8%	6%	2%	—N/a	—N/a	1%	—N/a	14%	27%
Quaest/Genial	3–6 Nov	2,063	21%	47%	8%	7%	—N/a	1%	—N/a	1%	—N/a	14%	26%
Vox Populi	30 Oct – 4 Nov	2,000	21%	44%	3%	4%	1%	—N/a	1%	—N/a	3%	22%	23%
Vox Populi	30 Oct – 4 Nov	2,000	21%	45%	3%	5%	—N/a	1%	1%	—N/a	3%	21%	24%
XP/Ipespe	25–28 Oct	1,000	28%	42%	—N/a	11%	4%	—N/a	3%	2%	—N/a	10%	14%
XP/Ipespe	25–28 Oct	1,000	25%	41%	8%	9%	—N/a	3%	3%	2%	4%	5%	16%
PoderData	25–27 Oct	2,500	28%	35%	8%	5%	4%	—N/a	4%	1%	6%	9%	7%
PoderData	25–27 Oct	2,500	30%	34%	7%	7%	—N/a	3%	4%	1%	7%	7%	4%
23 Oct			PSD confirms the candidacy of senator Rodrigo Pacheco.										
22 Oct			Former Judge and Justice Minister Moro confirms candidacy.										
Quaest/Genial	30 Sep – 3 Oct	2,048	24%	43%	—N/a	10%	—N/a	—N/a	—N/a	—N/a	11%	12%	19%
Quaest/Genial	30 Sep – 3 Oct	2,048	24%	44%	10%	9%	—N/a	—N/a	—N/a	—N/a	—N/a	12%	20%
Quaest/Genial	30 Sep – 3 Oct	2,048	26%	45%	—N/a	10%	6%	—N/a	—N/a	—N/a	—N/a	13%	19%
PoderData	27–29 Sep	2,500	30%	40%	—N/a	5%	3%	—N/a	3%	2%	6%	11%	10%
PoderData	27–29 Sep	2,500	28%	43%	—N/a	5%	—N/a	4%	3%	1%	4%	11%	15%
Ipespe	22–24 Sep	1,000	28%	43%	—N/a	11%	5%	—N/a	4%	2%	—N/a	7%	15%
Ipespe	22–24 Sep	1,000	25%	42%	7%	9%	5%	3%	3%	1%	4%	6%	17%
Ipec	16–20 Sep	2,002	23%	48%	—N/a	8%	3%	—N/a	3%	—N/a	—N/a	14%	25%
Ipec	16–20 Sep	2,002	22%	45%	5%	6%	2%	—N/a	3%	1%	3%	14%	23%
Datatempo	9–15 Sep	2,025	22%	36%	5.6%	7.8%	2%	—N/a	—N/a	—N/a	13.4%	14.2%	14%
Datafolha	13–15 Sep	3,667	26%	44%	—N/a	9%	4%	—N/a	3%	—N/a	—N/a	12%	18%
Datafolha	13–15 Sep	3,667	25%	42%	—N/a	12%	—N/a	4%	2%	—N/a	—N/a	13%	17%
Datafolha	13–15 Sep	3,667	25%	44%	—N/a	11%	6%	—N/a	—N/a	—N/a	—N/a	12%	19%
Datafolha	13–15 Sep	3,667	24%	42%	—N/a	10%	5%	—N/a	—N/a	1%	7%	12%	18%
Paraná Pesquisas	1–5 Sep	2,012	30.9%	35.5%	—N/a	9.7%	7.4%	—N/a	—N/a	—N/a	—N/a	16.5%	4.6%
PoderData	30 Aug – 1 Sep	2,500	28%	37%	—N/a	8%	4%	—N/a	5%	4%	3%	11%	9%
Quaest/Genial	26–29 Aug	2,000	26%	47%	—N/a	8%	6%	—N/a	—N/a	—N/a	—N/a	13%	21%
XP/Ipespe	11–14 Aug	1,000	24%	40%	9%	10%	5%	4%	4%	—N/a	—N/a	9%	16%
XP/Ipespe	11–14 Aug	1,000	28%	37%	—N/a	11%	5%	—N/a	—N/a	1%	5%	13%	9%
PoderData	2–4 Aug	2,500	25%	39%	—N/a	8%	6%	—N/a	4%	—N/a	7%	11%	14%
Quaest/Genial	29 Jul – 1 Aug	1,500	29%	46%	—N/a	12%	—N/a	—N/a	—N/a	—N/a	—N/a	13%	17%
Quaest/Genial	29 Jul – 1 Aug	1,500	27%	44%	—N/a	10%	—N/a	—N/a	—N/a	—N/a	10%	10%	17%
Paraná Pesquisas	24–28 Jul	2,010	32.7%	33.7%	—N/a	6.8%	3.9%	—N/a	1.8%	0.8%	7.7%	12.7%	1%
Datafolha	7–8 Jul	2,074	25%	46%	—N/a	8%	5%	—N/a	4%	—N/a	—N/a	12%	21%
XP/Ipespe	5–7 Jul	1,000	26%	38%	9%	10%	2%	—N/a	3%	—N/a	3%	13%	12%
XP/Ipespe	5–7 Jul	1,000	27%	35%	—N/a	11%	—N/a	4%	5%	—N/a	6%	13%	8%

Publisher/Pollster	Polling period	Sample size	Bolsonaro Indep.	Lula PT	Haddad PT	Dino PCdoB	Gomes PDT	Boulos PSOL	Doria PSDB	Amoêdo NOVO	Moro PODE	Huck Indep.	Others	Blank/Null/ Undec.	Lead
Exame/Ideia	22–24 Jun	1,200	31%	39%	—N/a	—N/a	14%	—N/a	8%	—N/a	—N/a	—N/a	—N/a	8%	8%
Instituto Ipec	17–21 Jun	2,002	23%	49%	—N/a	—N/a	7%	—N/a	5%	—N/a	—N/a	—N/a	3%	13%	26%
16 Jun			Huck withdraws candidacy.												
Instituto Mapa	18–20 May	2,000	26.8%	36.8%	—N/a	—N/a	5.0%	—N/a	3.3%	2.6%	5.1%	4.5%	2.7%	13.5%	10%
Vox Populi	12–16 May	2,000	24%	43%	—N/a	—N/a	5%	—N/a	2%	2%	—N/a	8%	—N/a	14%	19%
Datafolha	11–12 May	2,071	23%	41%	—N/a	—N/a	6%	—N/a	3%	2%	7%	4%	2% (Note: Luiz Henrique Mandetta (DEM) with 2%)	13%	18%
Exame/Ideia	19–22 Apr	1,200	32%	33%	—N/a	—N/a	9%	—N/a	4%	3%	—N/a	6%	5% (Note: Luiz Henrique Mandetta (DEM) with 3%; Danilo Gentili with 2%)	9%	1%
PoderData	12–14 Apr	3,500	31%	34%	—N/a	—N/a	6%	—N/a	4%	5%	3%	6%	2% (Note: Luiz Henrique Mandetta (DEM) with 2%)	9%	3%
XP/Ipespe	29–31 Mar	1,000	28%	29%	—N/a	—N/a	9%	3%	3%	—N/a	9%	5%	3% (Note: Luiz Henrique Mandetta (DEM) with 3%)	12%	1%
PoderData	15–17 Mar	3,500	30%	34%	—N/a	—N/a	5%	—N/a	3%	3%	6%	4%	2% (Note: Luiz Henrique Mandetta (DEM) with 2%)	13%	4%
Revista Fórum/Offerwise	11–15 Mar	1,000	30.7%	31.2%	—N/a	—N/a	7.4%	—N/a	6.4%	—N/a	—N/a	—N/a	—N/a	24.3%	0.5%
Revista Fórum/Offerwise	11–15 Mar	1,000	29.2%	27.1%	—N/a	0.2%	6.1%	1.5%	4.9%	1.6%	7.8%	6.8%	—N/a	14.6%	2.1%
Revista Fórum/Offerwise	11–15 Mar	1,000	31.2%	—N/a	13.3%	—N/a	7.7%	3.2%	7.0%	2.0%	—N/a	6.8%	—N/a	28.8%	17.9%
XP/Ipespe	9–11 Mar	1,000	27%	25%	—N/a	—N/a	9%	3%	3%	3%	10%	6%	2% (Note: Luiz Henrique Mandetta (DEM) with 2%)	13%	2%
XP/Ipespe	9–11 Mar	1,000	28%	—N/a	11%	—N/a	11%	6%	4%	3%	11%	7%	3% (Note: Luiz Henrique Mandetta (DEM) with 3%)	17%	17%
Exame/Ideia	10–11 Mar	1,000	33%	18%	—N/a	—N/a	9%	5%	7%	3%	11%	6%	2%	7%	15%
Atlas	8–10 Mar	3,721	32.7%	27.4%	—N/a	0.7%	7.5%	0.9%	4.3%	2.0%	9.7%	2.5%	5.0%	6.1%	5.3%
Atlas	8–10 Mar	3,721	32.3%	—N/a	15.7%	1.3%	11.6%	2.3%	5.3%	2.5%	10.4%	4.4%	6.0%	7.1%	16.6%
CNN Brasil/Real Time Big Data	8–9 Mar	1,200	31%	21%	—N/a	—N/a	9%	—N/a	4%	2%	10%	7%	—N/a	15%	10%
8 Mar			Lula's corruption charges annulled; political rights restored.												
Paraná Pesquisas	28 Feb − 1 Mar	2,080	37.6%	—N/a	14.3%	—N/a	13%	—N/a	6.9%	3.9%	—N/a	—N/a	2.7%	21.5%	23.3%
Paraná Pesquisas	28 Feb − 1 Mar	2,080	32.2%	18%	—N/a	—N/a	8.7%	3.5%	5.3%	3%	11.6%	—N/a	1.4%	16.3%	14.2%
Paraná Pesquisas	28 Feb − 1 Mar	2,080	32.9%	—N/a	10.8%	—N/a	10.3%	3.2%	—N/a	3%	12%	8.7%	2.3%	17.2%	20.4%
Paraná Pesquisas	28 Feb − 1 Mar	2,080	33.9%	—N/a	11.8%	—N/a	10.7%	3.2%	6.3%	3.2%	12.3%	—N/a	—N/a	18.6%	21.6%
Paraná Pesquisas	28 Feb − 1 Mar	2,080	31.9%	—N/a	10.5%	—N/a	10%	3.2%	5.3%	2.8%	11.5%	8%	—N/a	16.8%	20.5%
Exame/ideia	24−28 Jan	1,200	36%	17%	—N/a	—N/a	11%	8%	6%	—N/a	—N/a	—N/a	—N/a	22%	19%
Exame/ideia	24−28 Jan	1,200	33%	15%	—N/a	—N/a	10%	5%	—N/a	—N/a	—N/a	10%	—N/a	26%	18%
Exame/ideia	24−28 Jan	1,200	32%	17%	—N/a	3%	10%	5%	3%	—N/a	7%	8%	1%	15%	15%
Paraná Pesquisas	22−26 Jan	2,002	30.5%	—N/a	9.5%	—N/a	10.6%	3.5%	5.4%	2.9%	12%	8.1%	—N/a	17.4%	18.5%
Paraná Pesquisas	22−26 Jan	2,002	31%	17.3%	—N/a	—N/a	9.2%	3.6%	5.3%	3.3%	12.1%	—N/a	—N/a	15.8%	13.7%
Paraná Pesquisas	22−26 Jan	2,002	33.7%	—N/a	11.7%	1%	12.1%	—N/a	6.7%	3.1%	—N/a	9.4%	3.8%	19.1%	21.6%
Atlas	20−24 Jan	3,073	34.4%	—N/a	13.4%	—N/a	11.6%	—N/a	4.3%	—N/a	11.6%	—N/a	4.8%	19.9%	21%
Atlas	20−24 Jan	3,073	34.5%	22.3%	—N/a	1.4%	8.8%	—N/a	3.6%	—N/a	11.3%	1.9%	3.4%	12.8%	12.2%
XP/Ipespe	11−14 Jan	1,000	28%	—N/a	11%	—N/a	11%	5%	4%	3%	12%	7%	—N/a	18%	16%
2018 general election	7 Oct	—N/a	46.03%	—N/a	29.28%	—N/a	12.47%	0.58%	4.76%	2.50%	—N/a	—N/a	3.38%	—N/a	16.75%

=== 2020 ===
Publisher/Pollster	Polling period	Sample size	Bolsonaro Indep.	Lula PT	Haddad PT	Dino PCdoB	Gomes PDT	Boulos PSOL	Doria PSDB	Amoêdo NOVO	Moro PODE	Huck Indep.	Others	Blank/Null/ Undec.	Lead
PoderData	21−23 Dec	2,500	36%	—N/a	13%	1%	10%	5%	3%	3%	7%	9%	1%	12%	23%
XP/Ipespe	7−9 Dec	1,000	29%	—N/a	12%	—N/a	9%	5%	4%	3%	11%	7%	2%	19%	17%
Exame/Ideia	30 Nov − 3 Dec	1,200	28%	16%	—N/a	1%	7%	—N/a	4%	1%	10%	4%	4%	24%	12%
Paraná Pesquisas	28 Nov − 1 Dec	2,036	33.3%	—N/a	8.8%	—N/a	10%	5.7%	3.7%	2.8%	11.8%	7.8%	—N/a	16%	21.5%
Paraná Pesquisas	28 Nov − 1 Dec	2,036	32.9%	17.8%	—N/a	—N/a	7.7%	4.9%	3.8%	2.8%	11.9%	—N/a	—N/a	15.2%	15.1%
Paraná Pesquisas	28 Nov − 1 Dec	2,036	35.8%	—N/a	11.5%	1.2%	12.1%	—N/a	4.8%	3.5%	—N/a	9.5%	2.7%	19.1%	23.7%
XP/Ipespe	18−20 Nov	1.000	29%	—N/a	13%	—N/a	8%	5%	3%	4%	13%	7%	3%	19%	16%
XP/Ipespe	8−11 Oct	1,000	31%	—N/a	14%	—N/a	10%	—N/a	3%	3%	11%	5%	3%	20%	17%
Exame/Ideia	5−8 Oct	1,200	30%	18%	—N/a	1%	9%	—N/a	4%	1%	10%	5%	3%	19%	12%
PoderData	14−16 Sep	2,500	35%	—N/a	10%	4%	7%	—N/a	5%	—N/a	13%	—N/a	7%	19%	22%
PoderData	14−16 Sep	2,500	35%	21%	—N/a	3%	3%	—N/a	4%	—N/a	11%	—N/a	5%	18%	14%
Exame/Ideia	24−31 Aug	1,235	31%	17%	—	1%	6%	—N/a	3%	3%	13%	5%	5%	14%	14%
Revista Fórum/Offerwise	21−24 Aug	1,000	41.7%	—N/a	14.8%	1.2%	7.7%	—N/a	3.7%	2.3%	13.3%	9.7%	1.6%	—N/a	26.9%
PoderData	3−5 Aug	2,500	38%	—N/a	14%	3%	6%	—N/a	4%	—N/a	10%	—N/a	5%	20%	24%
Paraná Pesquisas	18−21 Jul	2,030	29%	—N/a	13.4%	—N/a	9.9%	—N/a	4.0%	3.4%	17.1%	6.5%	1.7%	14.9%	11.9%
Paraná Pesquisas	18−21 Jul	2,030	27.5%	21.9%	—N/a	—N/a	8.3%	—N/a	3.8%	3.4%	16.8%	—N/a	1.6%	14.1%	5.6%
Paraná Pesquisas	18−21 Jul	2,030	30.7%	—N/a	14.5%	1.6%	10.7%	—N/a	4.6%	4%	—N/a	8.3%	6.6%	18.9%	16.2%
Quaest	14−17 Jun	1,000	22%	—N/a	13%	—N/a	12%	—N/a	2%	—N/a	19%	5%	3%	23%	3%
Paraná Pesquisas	27–29 Apr	2,006	27%	—N/a	14.1%	—N/a	10.3%	—N/a	3.7%	4%	18.1%	6%	2.2%	14.6%	8.9%
Paraná Pesquisas	27–29 Apr	2,006	26.3%	23.1%	—N/a	—N/a	8.1%	—N/a	3.8%	4%	17.5%	—N/a	1.9%	13%	3.2%
Paraná Pesquisas	27–29 Apr	2,006	29.1%	—N/a	15.4%	1.4%	11.1%	—N/a	4.4%	4.5%	—N/a	8.1%	7.9%	18.1%	13.7%
Veja/FSB	7–10 Feb	2,000	37%	—N/a	13%	—N/a	11%	—N/a	3%	5%	—N/a	12%	—N/a	21%	24%
Veja/FSB	7–10 Feb	2,000	31%	28%	—N/a	—N/a	8%	—N/a	4%	5%	—N/a	11%	—N/a	12%	3%
Veja/FSB	7–10 Feb	2,000	28%	—N/a	15%	—N/a	9%	—N/a	3%	4%	17%	13%	—N/a	12%	11%
Veja/FSB	7–10 Feb	2,000	—N/a	—N/a	14%	—N/a	12%	—N/a	4%	5%	31%	16%	—N/a	19%	5%
Veja/FSB	7–10 Feb	2,000	—N/a	28%	—N/a	—N/a	9%	—N/a	3%	5%	33%	10%	—N/a	13%	5%
Atlas Político	7–9 Feb	2,000	41%	—N/a	—N/a	13%	—N/a	—N/a	2.5%	—N/a	—N/a	14%	—N/a	27%	27%
Atlas Político	7–9 Feb	2,000	32%	28%	—N/a	3%	—N/a	—N/a	0.6%	—N/a	20%	14%	—N/a	9%	4%
CNT/MDA	15–18 Jan	2,002	29.1%	17%	2.3%	—N/a	3.5%	—N/a	0.3%	1.1%	2.4%	0.5%	2.7%	30.2%	12.2%
2018 general election	7 Oct	—N/a	46.03%	—N/a	29.28%	—N/a	12.47%	0.58%	4.76%	2.50%	—N/a	—N/a	3.38%	—N/a	16.75%

=== 2019 ===
Publisher/Pollster	Polling period	Sample size	Bolsonaro Indep.	Lula PT	Haddad PT	Gomes PDT	Doria PSDB	Amoêdo NOVO	Moro PODE	Huck Indep.	Others	Blank/Null/ Undec.	Lead
Veja/FSB	11 Nov – 2 Dec	2,000	33%	—N/a	15%	11%	3%	5%	—N/a	12%	—N/a	22%	18%
Veja/FSB	11 Nov – 2 Dec	2,000	32%	29%	—N/a	9%	4%	5%	—N/a	9%	—N/a	12%	3%
Veja/FSB	11 Nov – 2 Dec	2,000	28%	—N/a	16%	11%	2%	4%	15%	13%	—N/a	12%	12%
Veja/FSB	11 Nov – 2 Dec	2,000	—N/a	—N/a	16%	12%	4%	4%	32%	15%	—N/a	17%	16%
Veja/FSB	11 Nov – 2 Dec	2,000	—N/a	29%	—N/a	9%	4%	5%	32%	10%	—N/a	11%	3%
Veja/FSB	11–14 Oct	2,000	34%	—N/a	17%	9%	3%	5%	—N/a	11%	—N/a	21%	18%
Veja/FSB	11–14 Oct	2,000	24%	—N/a	14%	10%	3%	4%	17%	15%	—N/a	13%	7%
Veja/FSB	11–14 Oct	2,000	—N/a	—N/a	16%	11%	5%	5%	30%	16%	—N/a	17%	14%
Veja/FSB	16–18 Aug	2,000	35%	—N/a	17%	11%	3%	5%	—N/a	11%	—N/a	18%	18%
Veja/FSB	16–18 Aug	2,000	—N/a	—N/a	18%	13%	5%	5%	27%	13%	—N/a	19%	9%
2018 general election	7 Oct	—N/a	46.03%	—N/a	29.28%	12.47%	4.76%	2.50%	—N/a	—N/a	4.96%	—N/a	16.75%

== Second round ==
The second round took place on 30 October 2022.

=== Bolsonaro vs. Lula ===
Local regression of polls conducted

==== Polling aggregation ====
Aggregator	Last update	Bolsonaro PL	Lula PT	Blank/Null/ Undec.	Lead
The Economist	29 Oct 2022	48%	52%	—N/a	Lula +4
Veja	29 Oct 2022	43.5%	48.4%	8.1%	Lula +4.9
Estadão	29 Oct 2022	44%	49%	7%	Lula +5
CNN Brasil	29 Oct 2022	43.6%	49.6%	6.7%	Lula +6.0
PollingData	29 Oct 2022	45.3%	46.1%	9%	Lula +0.8
El Electoral	26 Oct 2022	45%	49%	6%	Lula +4
Pollstergraph	29 Oct 2022	45.3%	47.6%	7.1%	Lula +2.3

==== After 2 October 2022 ====
Publisher/Pollster	Polling period	Sample size	Bolsonaro PL	Lula PT	Blank/Null/ Undec.	Lead
Results	30 Oct 2022	Valid votes	49.1%	50.9%	(N/A)	1.8%
Results	30 Oct 2022	Total votes	46.8%	48.6%	4.6%	1.7% (Note: The lead is smaller than the difference between the displayed values of 48.6% and 46.8%, which is 1.8%, due to rounding.)
Datafolha	28–29 Oct 2022	8,308	45%	49%	7%	4%
Genial/Quaest	27–29 Oct 2022	2,000	42%	45%	13%	3%
Ipec	27–29 Oct 2022	4,272	43%	50%	7%	7%
Atlas	26–29 Oct 2022	7,500	45.7%	52.4%	1.9%	6.7%
CNT/MDA	26–28 Oct 2022	2,002	44.9%	46.9%	8.2%	2%
Paraná Pesquisas	26–28 Oct 2022	2,400	46.3%	47.1%	6.6%	0.8%
28 Oct 2022			Fourth presidential debate.			
Datafolha	25–27 Oct 2022	4,580	44%	49%	7%	5%
ModalMais/Futura	24–26 Oct 2022	2,000	47.2%	46.6%	6.1%	0.6%
Gerp	21–26 Oct 2022	2,095	47%	43%	9%	4%
PoderData	23–25 Oct 2022	5,000	44%	49%	7%	5%
Genial/Quaest	23–25 Oct 2022	2,000	42%	48%	10%	6%
Abrapel/Ipespe	22–24 Oct 2022	1,100	44%	50%	6%	6%
Ipec	22–24 Oct 2022	3,008	43%	50%	7%	7%
Paraná Pesquisas	20–24 Oct 2022	2,020	45.9%	46.3%	7.8%	0.4%
23 Oct 2022			Third presidential debate. Lula did not attend.			
Atlas	18–22 Oct 2022	4,500	46.2%	52.0%	1.8%	5.8%
21 Oct 2022			Second presidential debate. Lula did not attend.			
ModalMais/Futura	17–19 Oct 2022	2,000	46.9%	45.9%	7.1%	1.0%
Datafolha	17–19 Oct 2022	2,912	45%	49%	5%	4%
Paraná Pesquisas	15–19 Oct 2022	2,020	44.5%	46.9%	8.6%	2.4%
Ideia	14–19 Oct 2022	1,500	46%	50%	4%	4%
Abrapel/Ipespe	17–18 Oct 2022	1,100	43%	49%	8%	6%
PoderData	16–18 Oct 2022	5,000	44%	48%	8%	4%
Genial/Quaest	16–18 Oct 2022	2,000	42%	47%	11%	5%
Ipec	11–17 Oct 2022	3,008	43%	50%	7%	7%
16 Oct 2022			First presidential debate for second round.			
CNT/MDA	14–16 Oct 2022	2,002	41.8%	48.1%	10.1%	6.3%
Datafolha	13–14 Oct 2022	2,898	45%	49%	6%	5%
ModalMais/Futura	10–12 Oct 2022	2,000	46.5%	46.9%	6.6%	0.4%
Abrapel/Ipespe	10–12 Oct 2022	2,000	43%	49%	8%	6%
Atlas	8–12 Oct 2022	4,500	46.5%	51.1%	3.3%	4.6%
Paraná Pesquisas	8–12 Oct 2022	2,020	44.1%	47.6%	8.4%	3.5%
PoderData	9–11 Oct 2022	5,000	44%	48%	8%	4%
Gerp	6–11 Oct 2022	2,095	46%	48%	6%	2%
Abrapel/Ipespe	8–10 Oct 2022	1,100	43%	50%	7%	7%
IPEC	8–10 Oct 2022	2,000	42%	51%	7%	9%
Datafolha	5–7 Oct 2022	2,884	44%	49%	7%	5%
Genial/Quaest	3–5 Oct 2022	2,000	41%	48%	11%	7%
PoderData	3–5 Oct 2022	3,500	44%	48%	8%	4%
IPEC	3–5 Oct 2022	2,000	43%	51%	6%	8%
ModalMais/Futura	3–4 Oct 2022	2,000	46.0%	49.3%	4.7%	3.3%

==== 2021 to 2 October 2022 ====
Publisher/Pollster	Polling period	Sample size	Bolsonaro PL	Lula PT	Blank/Null/ Undec.	Lead
Datafolha	30 Sep – 1 Oct 2022	12,800	38%	54%	8%	16%
IPEC	29 Sep – 1 Oct 2022	3,008	37%	52%	11%	15%
Abrapel/Ipespe	30 Sep 2022	1,100	38%	55%	7%	17%
Atlas	28–30 Sep 2022	4,500	42.8%	53.1%	4.1%	10.3%
CNT/MDA	28–30 Sep 2022	2,002	41.2%	50.4%	8.4%	9.2%
Atlas	24–28 Sep 2022	4,500	42.4%	51.8%	5.8%	9.4%
Exame/Ideia	23–28 Sep 2022	1,500	41%	52%	7%	11%
Genial/Quaest	24–27 Sep 2022	2,000	38%	52%	10%	14%
Atlas	22–26 Sep 2022	4,500	43.7%	51.3%	5%	7.6%
Ipec	25–26 Sep 2022	3,008	35%	54%	14%	19%
BTG Pactual/FSB	23–25 Sep 2022	2,000	40%	52%	8%	12%
Abrapel/Ipespe	21–23 Sep 2022	1,100	38%	54%	8%	16%
Datafolha	20–22 Sep 2022	6,754	38%	54%	9%	16%
XP/Ipespe	19–21 Sep 2022	2,000	37%	54%	9%	17%
PoderData	18–20 Sep 2022	3,500	42%	50%	8%	8%
Genial/Quaest	17–20 Sep 2022	2,000	40%	50%	10%	10%
Arko/Atlas	16–20 Sep 2022	7,514	41.4%	53.1%	5.5%	11.7%
Ipec	17–18 Sep 2022	3,008	35%	54%	11%	19%
BTG/FSB	16–18 Sep 2022	2,000	39%	52%	9%	13%
Aprapel/Ipespe	14–16 Sep 2022	1,100	38%	53%	9%	15%
Datafolha	13–15 Sep 2022	5,926	38%	54%	8%	16%
PoderData	11–13 Sep 2022	3,500	42%	51%	6%	9%
Genial/Quaest	10–13 Sep 2022	2,000	40%	48%	12%	8%
Globo/Ipec	9–11 Sep 2022	2,512	36%	53%	12%	17%
BTG/FSB	9–11 Sep 2022	2,000	38%	51%	11%	13%
Datafolha	8–9 Sep 2022	2,676	39%	53%	9%	14%
Abrapel/Ipespe	7–9 Sep 2022	1,100	39%	52%	9%	13%
BTG/FSB	2–4 Sep 2022	2,000	40%	53%	8%	13%
Globo/Ipec	2–4 Sep 2022	2,512	36%	52%	12%	16%
Genial/Quaest	1–4 Sep 2022	2,000	39%	51%	10%	12%
Abrapel/Ipespe	30 Aug – 1 Sep 2022	1,100	38%	53%	9%	15%
PoderData	28–30 Aug 2022	3,500	41%	50%	9%	9%
Paraná Pesquisas	26–30 Aug 2022	2,020	40.8%	47.8%	11.4%	7%
XP/Ipespe	26–29 Aug 2022	2,000	38%	53%	9%	15%
BTG/FSB	26–28 Aug 2022	2,000	39%	52%	9%	13%
Ipec	26–28 Aug 2022	2,000	37%	50%	13%	13%
Quaest	25–28 Aug 2022	2,000	37%	51%	13%	14%
CNT/MDA	25–28 Aug 2022	2,002	38.8%	50.1%	11.1%	11.3%
Modalmais/Futura	24−25 Aug 2022	2,000	43.8%	45.3%	10.9%	1.5%
Atlas	20–25 Aug 2022	7,475	40.8%	51.8%	7.4%	11%
Exame/Ideia	19–24 Aug 2022	1,500	40%	49%	11%	9%
BTG/FSB	19–21 Aug 2022	2,000	39%	52%	9%	13%
Datafolha	16–18 Aug 2022	5,744	37%	54%	10%	17%
PoderData	14–16 Aug 2022	3,500	38%	52%	10%	14%
Ipec	12–14 Aug 2022	2,000	35%	51%	14%	16%
FSB Comunicação	12–14 Aug 2022	2,000	38%	53%	10%	15%
Quaest/Genial	11–14 Aug 2022	2,000	38%	51%	11%	13%
FSB Comunicação	5–7 Aug 2022	3,500	39%	51%	10%	12%
PoderData	31 Jul – 2 Aug 2022	3,500	40%	50%	9%	10%
Datafolha	22–24 Jul 2022	2,566	35%	55%	9%	20%
BTG/FSB	22–24 Jul 2022	2,000	36%	54%	9%	18%
Exame/Ideia	15–20 Jul 2022	1,500	37%	47%	11%	10%
PoderData	17–19 Jul 2022	3,000	38%	51%	12%	13%
BTG/FSB	8–10 Jul 2022	2,000	37%	53%	10%	16%
PoderData	3–5 Jul 2022	3,000	38%	50%	12%	12%
Quaest/Genial	29 Jun – 2 Jul 2022	2,000	34%	53%	13%	19%
BTG/FSB	24–26 Jun 2022	2,000	37%	52%	10%	15%
Datafolha	22–23 Jun 2022	2,556	34%	57%	9%	23%
Exame/Ideia	17–22 Jun 2022	1,500	41%	48%	10%	7%
PoderData	19–21 Jun 2022	3,000	35%	52%	13%	17%
BTG/FSB	10–12 Jun 2022	2,000	36%	54%	8%	18%
PoderData	05–07 Jun 2022	3,000	40%	50%	10%	10%
Quaest/Genial	02–05 Jun 2022	2,000	32%	54%	12%	22%
XP/Ipespe	30 May – 1 Jun 2022	1,000	35%	53%	12%	18%
Paraná Pesquisas	26–30 May 2022	2,020	39.2%	47.3%	13.5%	8.1%
BTG/FSB	27–29 May 2022	2,000	35%	54%	11%	19%
Datafolha	25–26 May 2022	2,556	33%	58%	9%	25%
XP/Ipespe	23–25 May 2022	1,000	35%	53%	12%	18%
PoderData	22–24 May 2022	3,000	39%	50%	11%	11%
Modalmais/Futura	16–19 May 2022	2,000	40.1%	49%	10.9%	8.9%
Exame/Ideia	14–19 May 2022	1,500	39%	46%	15%	7%
XP/Ipespe	17–18 May 2022	1,000	34%	53%	13%	19%
XP/Ipespe	9–11 May 2022	1,000	35%	54%	10%	19%
PoderData	8–10 May 2022	3,000	38%	49%	13%	11%
Quaest/Genial	5–8 May 2022	2,000	34%	54%	11%	20%
CNT/MDA	4–7 May 2022	2,002	36.8%	50.8%	12.4%	14%
XP/Ipespe	2–4 May 2022	1,000	34%	54%	12%	20%
Paraná Pesquisas	28–3 May 2022	2,020	38.7%	46.4%	15%	7.7%
PoderData	24–26 Apr 2022	3,000	39%	48%	13%	9%
BTG/FSB	22–24 Apr 2022	2,000	37%	52%	10%	15%
XP/Ipespe	18–20 Apr 2022	1,000	34%	54%	12%	20%
Exame/Ideia	15–20 Apr 2022	1,500	39%	48%	13%	9%
PoderData	10–12 Apr 2022	3,000	38%	47%	15%	9%
XP/Ipespe	2–5 Apr 2022	1,000	33%	53%	14%	20%
Paraná Pesquisas	31–5 Apr 2022	2,020	38.5%	47.1%	14.4%	8.6%
Quaest/Genial	1–3 Apr 2022	2,000	34%	55%	11%	21%
PoderData	27–29 Mar 2022	3,000	38%	50%	12%	12%
Futura/Modalmais	21–25 Mar 2022	2,000	41.6%	48.6%	9.8%	7%
Datafolha	22–23 Mar 2022	2,556	34%	55%	11%	21%
Exame/Ideia	18–23 Mar 2022	1,500	37%	50%	13%	13%
FSB	18–20 Mar 2022	2,000	35%	54%	11%	19%
PoderData	13–15 Mar 2022	3,000	36%	50%	14%	14%
Quaest/Genial	10–13 Mar 2022	2,000	32%	54%	13%	22%
Ranking Brasil	7–12 Mar 2022	3,000	38.3%	45%	16.7%	6.7%
XP/Ipespe	7–9 Mar 2022	1,000	33%	53%	14%	20%
Paraná Pesquisas	3–8 Mar 2022	2,020	37.3%	46%	16.7%	8.7%
PoderData	27–1 Mar 2022	3,000	37%	51%	11%	14%
Ipespe	21–23 Feb 2022	1,000	32%	54%	14%	22%
Exame/Ideia	18–22 Feb 2022	1,500	35%	49%	16%	14%
CNT/MDA	16–19 Feb 2022	2,002	35.3%	53.2%	17.9%	17.9%
Futura/Modalmais	14–17 Feb 2022	2,000	40.1%	48%	11.9%	7.9%
PoderData	13–15 Feb 2022	3,000	35%	50%	15%	15%
XP/Ipespe	7–9 Feb 2022	1,000	31%	54%	15%	23%
Quaest/Genial	3–6 Feb 2022	2,000	30%	54%	16%	24%
Paraná Pesquisas	27–1 Feb 2022	2,020	34.4%	48.8%	16.8%	14.4%
PoderData	31–1 Feb 2022	3,000	37%	54%	9%	17%
XP/Ipespe	24–25 Jan 2022	1,000	30%	54%	16%	24%
Futura/Modalmais	17–21 Jan 2022	2,000	37.8%	50.4%	11.8%	12.6%
PoderData	16–18 Jan 2022	3,000	32%	54%	14%	22%
Exame/Ideia	9–13 Jan 2022	1,500	33%	49%	18%	16%
XP/Ipespe	10–12 Jan 2022	1,000	31%	56%	13%	25%
Quaest/Genial	6–9 Jan 2022	2,000	30%	54%	16%	24%
PoderData	19–21 Dec 2021	3,000	34%	54%	12%	20%
Ipespe	14–16 Dec 2021	1,000	31%	53%	16%	22%
Ipespe	22–24 Nov 2021	1,000	32%	52%	16%	20%
PoderData	22–24 Nov 2021	2,500	31%	54%	15%	23%
Paraná Pesquisas	16–19 Nov 2021	2,020	35.6%	42.5%	21.9%	6.9%
Ponteio Política	16–18 Nov 2021	1,000	32%	50%	18%	18%
Exame/Ideia	9–11 Nov 2021	1,200	31%	48%	21%	17%
Quaest/Genial	3–6 Nov 2021	2,063	27%	57%	13%	30%
XP/Ipespe	25–28 Oct 2021	1,000	32%	50%	18%	18%
PoderData	25–27 Oct 2021	2,500	37%	52%	11%	15%
PoderData	27–29 Sep 2021	2,500	33%	56%	11%	23%
Datatempo	9–15 Sep 2021	2,025	30.1%	53.1%	16.8%	23%
Datafolha	13–15 Sep 2021	3,667	31%	56%	14%	25%
PoderData	30–1 Sep 2021	2,500	30%	55%	15%	25%
Quaest/Genial	26–29 Aug 2021	2,000	30%	55%	15%	25%
XP/Ipespe	11–14 Aug 2021	1,000	32%	51%	17%	19%
PoderData	2–4 Aug 2021	2,500	32%	52%	16%	20%
XP/Ipespe	5–7 Jul 2021	1,000	35%	49%	17%	14%

=== Other ===
==== 2021 ====
Publisher/Pollster	Polling period	Sample size	Bolsonaro Indep.	Lula PT	Haddad PT	Gomes PDT	Boulos PSOL	Doria PSDB	Moro PODE	Huck Indep.	Others	Blank/Null/ Undec.	Lead
Datafolha	7–8 Jul	2,074	31%	58%	—N/a	—N/a	—N/a	—N/a	—N/a	—N/a	—N/a	11%	27%
Datafolha	7–8 Jul	2,074	—N/a	56%	—N/a	—N/a	—N/a	22%	—N/a	—N/a	—N/a	21%	34%
Vox Populi	12–16 May	2,000	28%	55%	—N/a	—N/a	—N/a	—N/a	—N/a	—N/a	—N/a	17%	27%
Vox Populi	12–16 May	2,000	—N/a	52%	—N/a	19%	—N/a	—N/a	—N/a	—N/a	—N/a	29%	33%
Vox Populi	12–16 May	2,000	—N/a	56%	—N/a	—N/a	—N/a	14%	—N/a	—N/a	—N/a	30%	42%
Datafolha	11–12 May	2,071	32%	55%	—N/a	—N/a	—N/a	—N/a	—N/a	—N/a	—N/a	13%	23%
Datafolha	11–12 May	2,071	—N/a	53%	—N/a	—N/a	—N/a	—N/a	33%	—N/a	—N/a	14%	20%
Datafolha	11–12 May	2,071	—N/a	57%	—N/a	—N/a	—N/a	—N/a	—N/a	21%	—N/a	22%	36%
Datafolha	11–12 May	2,071	36%	—N/a	—N/a	48%	—N/a	—N/a	—N/a	—N/a	—N/a	17%	12%
Datafolha	11–12 May	2,071	39%	—N/a	—N/a	—N/a	—N/a	40%	—N/a	—N/a	—N/a	22%	1%
Exame/Ideia	19–22 Apr	1,200	38%	40%	—N/a	—N/a	—N/a	—N/a	—N/a	—N/a	—N/a	23%	2%
PoderData	12–14 Apr	3,500											
PoderData	12–14 Apr	3,500	34%	52%	—N/a	—N/a	—N/a	—N/a	—N/a	—N/a	—N/a	14%	18%
PoderData	12–14 Apr	3,500	35%	—N/a	—N/a	—N/a	—N/a	—N/a	—N/a	48%	—N/a	17%	13%
PoderData	12–14 Apr	3,500	38%	—N/a	—N/a	—N/a	—N/a	37%	—N/a	—N/a	—N/a	25%	1%
PoderData	12–14 Apr	3,500	38%	—N/a	—N/a	—N/a	—N/a	—N/a	37%	—N/a	—N/a	25%	1%
PoderData	12–14 Apr	3,500	38%	—N/a	—N/a	38%	—N/a	—N/a	—N/a	—N/a	—N/a	24%	Tie
XP/Ipespe	29–31 Mar	1,000											
XP/Ipespe	29–31 Mar	1,000	38%	41%	—N/a	—N/a	—N/a	—N/a	—N/a	—N/a	—N/a	20%	4%
XP/Ipespe	29–31 Mar	1,000	30%	—N/a	—N/a	—N/a	—N/a	—N/a	30%	—N/a	—N/a	40%	Tie
XP/Ipespe	29–31 Mar	1,000	38%	—N/a	—N/a	38%	—N/a	—N/a	—N/a	—N/a	—N/a	33%	Tie
XP/Ipespe	29–31 Mar	1,000	35%	—N/a	—N/a	—N/a	—N/a	—N/a	—N/a	32%	—N/a	33%	3%
XP/Ipespe	29–31 Mar	1,000	38%	—N/a	—N/a	—N/a	30%	—N/a	—N/a	—N/a	—N/a	32%	8%
XP/Ipespe	29–31 Mar	1,000	37%	—N/a	—N/a	—N/a	—N/a	30%	—N/a	—N/a	—N/a	33%	7%
XP/Ipespe	29–31 Mar	1,000	—N/a	41%	—N/a	—N/a	—N/a	—N/a	36%	—N/a	—N/a	23%	5%
PoderData	15–17 Mar	3,500	36%	41%	—N/a	—N/a	—N/a	—N/a	—N/a	—N/a	—N/a	23%	5%
PoderData	15–17 Mar	3,500	34%	—N/a	—N/a	39%	—N/a	—N/a	—N/a	—N/a	—N/a	27%	5%
PoderData	15–17 Mar	3,500	37%	—N/a	—N/a	—N/a	—N/a	—N/a	—N/a	40%	—N/a	23%	3%
PoderData	15–17 Mar	3,500	41%	—N/a	—N/a	—N/a	—N/a	31%	—N/a	—N/a	—N/a	28%	10%
PoderData	15–17 Mar	3,500	38%	—N/a	—N/a	—N/a	—N/a	—N/a	31%	—N/a	—N/a	31%	7%
Revista Fórum/Offerwise	11–15 Mar	1,000	33.8%	38.0%	—N/a	—N/a	—N/a	—N/a	—N/a	—N/a	—N/a	28.3%	4.2%
Revista Fórum/Offerwise	11–15 Mar	1,000	—N/a	33.6%	—N/a	16.7%	—N/a	—N/a	—N/a	—N/a	—N/a	49.6%	16.9%
Revista Fórum/Offerwise	11–15 Mar	1,000	—N/a	36.9%	—N/a	—N/a	—N/a	13.4%	—N/a	—N/a	—N/a	49.8%	23.5%
Revista Fórum/Offerwise	11–15 Mar	1,000	—N/a	35.4%	—N/a	—N/a	—N/a	—N/a	—N/a	17.4%	—N/a	47.2%	18.0%
Revista Fórum/Offerwise	11–15 Mar	1,000	—N/a	35.7%	—N/a	—N/a	—N/a	—N/a	24.5%	—N/a	—N/a	39.8%	11.2%
XP/Ipespe	9–11 Mar	1,000	41%	40%	—N/a	—N/a	—N/a	—N/a	—N/a	—N/a	—N/a	19%	1%
XP/Ipespe	9–11 Mar	1,000	40%	—N/a	36%	—N/a	—N/a	—N/a	—N/a	—N/a	—N/a	24%	4%
XP/Ipespe	9–11 Mar	1,000	31%	—N/a	—N/a	—N/a	—N/a	—N/a	34%	—N/a	—N/a	35%	3%
XP/Ipespe	9–11 Mar	1,000	37%	—N/a	—N/a	—N/a	—N/a	—N/a	—N/a	32%	—N/a	30%	5%
XP/Ipespe	9–11 Mar	1,000	39%	—N/a	—N/a	37%	—N/a	—N/a	—N/a	—N/a	—N/a	25%	2%
XP/Ipespe	9–11 Mar	1,000	40%	—N/a	—N/a	—N/a	30%	—N/a	—N/a	—N/a	—N/a	30%	10%
XP/Ipespe	9–11 Mar	1,000	39%	—N/a	—N/a	—N/a	—N/a	29%	—N/a	—N/a	—N/a	32%	10%
XP/Ipespe	9–11 Mar	1,000	—N/a	—N/a	30%	—N/a	—N/a	—N/a	40%	—N/a	—N/a	30%	10%
Exame/Ideia	10–11 Mar	1,000	44%	37%	—N/a	—N/a	—N/a	—N/a	—N/a	—N/a	—N/a	19%	7%
Exame/Ideia	10–11 Mar	1,000	45%	—N/a	—N/a	34%	—N/a	—N/a	—N/a	—N/a	—N/a	21%	11%
Exame/Ideia	10–11 Mar	1,000	47%	—N/a	—N/a	—N/a	—N/a	26%	—N/a	—N/a	—N/a	26%	21%
Exame/Ideia	10–11 Mar	1,000	46%	—N/a	—N/a	—N/a	—N/a	—N/a	—N/a	37%	—N/a	17%	9%
Atlas	—N/a	3,721	36.9%	—N/a	—N/a	—N/a	—N/a	—N/a	—N/a	—N/a	46.6% (Note: Luiz Henrique Mandetta (DEM) with 46.6%)	16.5%	9.7%
Atlas	—N/a	3,721	37.5%	—N/a	—N/a	44.7%	—N/a	—N/a	—N/a	—N/a	—N/a	17.8%	7.2%
Atlas	—N/a	3,721	38.8%	44.9%	—N/a	—N/a	—N/a	—N/a	—N/a	—N/a	—N/a	16.3%	6.1%
Atlas	—N/a	3,721	39.4%	—N/a	43.0%	—N/a	—N/a	—N/a	—N/a	—N/a	—N/a	17.6%	3.6%
Atlas	—N/a	3,721	39.8%	—N/a	—N/a	—N/a	—N/a	39.3%	—N/a	—N/a	—N/a	20.9%	0.5%
Atlas	—N/a	3,721	37.1%	—N/a	—N/a	—N/a	—N/a	—N/a	—N/a	—N/a	—N/a	26.8%	1.0%
Atlas	—N/a	3,721	34.3%	—N/a	—N/a	—N/a	—N/a	—N/a	33.1%	—N/a	—N/a	32.6%	1.2%
Atlas	—N/a	3,721	37.3%	—N/a	—N/a	—N/a	—N/a	—N/a	—N/a	32.5%	—N/a	30.2%	4.8%
CNN Brasil/Real Time Big Data	8–9 Mar	1,200	43%	39%	—N/a	—N/a	—N/a	—N/a	—N/a	—N/a	—N/a	18%	4%
CNN Brasil/Real Time Big Data	8–9 Mar	1,200	43%	—N/a	—N/a	36%	—N/a	—N/a	—N/a	—N/a	—N/a	21%	7%
CNN Brasil/Real Time Big Data	8–9 Mar	1,200	41%	—N/a	—N/a	—N/a	—N/a	—N/a	38%	—N/a	—N/a	21%	3%
CNN Brasil/Real Time Big Data	8–9 Mar	1,200	46%	—N/a	—N/a	—N/a	—N/a	—N/a	—N/a	31%	—N/a	23%	15%
Exame/Ideia	24−28 Jan	1,200	45%	28%	—N/a	—N/a	—N/a	—N/a	—N/a	—N/a	—N/a	26%	17%
Exame/Ideia	24−28 Jan	1,200	41%	—N/a	—N/a	34%	—N/a	—N/a	—N/a	—N/a	—N/a	26%	7%
Exame/Ideia	24−28 Jan	1,200	45%	—N/a	—N/a	—N/a	—N/a	30%	—N/a	—N/a	—N/a	24%	15%
Exame/Ideia	24−28 Jan	1,200	41%	—N/a	—N/a	—N/a	—N/a	—N/a	—N/a	38%	—N/a	21%	3%
Paraná Pesquisas	22−26 Jan	2,002	42.4%	35.7%	—N/a	—N/a	—N/a	—N/a	—N/a	—N/a	—N/a	21.9%	6.7%
Paraná Pesquisas	22−26 Jan	2,002	39.1%	—N/a	—N/a	—N/a	—N/a	—N/a	37.6%	—N/a	—N/a	23.3%	1.5%
Paraná Pesquisas	22−26 Jan	2,002	43.7%	—N/a	—N/a	34.3%	—N/a	—N/a	—N/a	—N/a	—N/a	22.1%	9.4%
Paraná Pesquisas	22−26 Jan	2,002	44.9%	—N/a	—N/a	—N/a	—N/a	29.4%	—N/a	—N/a	—N/a	25.8%	15.5%
Paraná Pesquisas	22−26 Jan	2,002	42.7%	—N/a	—N/a	—N/a	—N/a	—N/a	—N/a	33.2%	—N/a	24.1%	9.5%
XP/Ipespe	11−14 Jan	1,000	38%	—N/a	—N/a	—N/a	—N/a	—N/a	—N/a	34%	—N/a	28%	4%
XP/Ipespe	11−14 Jan	1,000	33%	—N/a	—N/a	—N/a	—N/a	—N/a	36%	—N/a	—N/a	31%	3%
XP/Ipespe	11−14 Jan	1,000	40%	—N/a	—N/a	37%	—N/a	—N/a	—N/a	—N/a	—N/a	23%	3%
XP/Ipespe	11−14 Jan	1,000	44%	—N/a	—N/a	—N/a	31%	—N/a	—N/a	—N/a	—N/a	25%	13%
XP/Ipespe	11−14 Jan	1,000	42%	—N/a	37%	—N/a	—N/a	—N/a	—N/a	—N/a	—N/a	22%	5%
XP/Ipespe	11−14 Jan	1,000	—N/a	—N/a	30%	—N/a	—N/a	—N/a	43%	—N/a	—N/a	28%	13%

==== 2020 ====
Publisher/Pollster	Polling period	Sample size	Bolsonaro Indep.	Lula PT	Haddad PT	Gomes PDT	Boulos PSOL	Doria PSDB	Moro PODE	Huck Indep.	Others	Blank/Null/ Undec.	Lead
PoderData	21−23 Dec	2,500	44%	—N/a	—N/a	—N/a	—N/a	—N/a	—N/a	38%	—N/a	18%	6%
PoderData	21−23 Dec	2,500	43%	—N/a	—N/a	—N/a	—N/a	—N/a	36%	—N/a	—N/a	21%	7%
PoderData	21−23 Dec	2,500	44%	—N/a	—N/a	35%	—N/a	—N/a	—N/a	—N/a	—N/a	21%	9%
PoderData	21−23 Dec	2,500	46%	—N/a	—N/a	—N/a	34%	—N/a	—N/a	—N/a	—N/a	20%	12%
PoderData	21−23 Dec	2,500	48%	—N/a	35%	—N/a	—N/a	—N/a	—N/a	—N/a	—N/a	17%	13%
PoderData	21−23 Dec	2,500	46%	—N/a	—N/a	—N/a	—N/a	31%	—N/a	—N/a	—N/a	23%	15%
XP/Ipespe	7−9 Dec	1,000	36%	—N/a	—N/a	—N/a	—N/a	—N/a	34%	—N/a	—N/a	30%	2%
XP/Ipespe	7−9 Dec	1,000	45%	—N/a	35%	—N/a	—N/a	—N/a	—N/a	—N/a	—N/a	21%	10%
XP/Ipespe	7−9 Dec	1,000	40%	—N/a	—N/a	—N/a	—N/a	—N/a	—N/a	33%	—N/a	27%	7%
XP/Ipespe	7−9 Dec	1,000	43%	—N/a	—N/a	36%	—N/a	—N/a	—N/a	—N/a	—N/a	22%	7%
XP/Ipespe	7−9 Dec	1,000	47%	—N/a	—N/a	—N/a	31%	—N/a	—N/a	—N/a	—N/a	22%	16%
XP/Ipespe	7−9 Dec	1,000	—N/a	—N/a	27%	—N/a	—N/a	—N/a	46%	—N/a	—N/a	28%	19%
Exame/Ideia	30 Nov − 3 Dec	1,200	37%	32%	—N/a	—N/a	—N/a	—N/a	—N/a	—N/a	—N/a	31%	5%
Exame/Ideia	30 Nov − 3 Dec	1,200	44%	—N/a	—N/a	—N/a	—N/a	—N/a	29%	—N/a	—N/a	27%	15%
Exame/Ideia	30 Nov − 3 Dec	1,200	38%	—N/a	—N/a	—N/a	—N/a	22%	—N/a	—N/a	—N/a	40%	16%
Exame/Ideia	30 Nov − 3 Dec	1,200	37%	—N/a	—N/a	36%	—N/a	—N/a	—N/a	—N/a	—N/a	27%	1%
Exame/Ideia	30 Nov − 3 Dec	1,200	36%	—N/a	—N/a	—N/a	—N/a	—N/a	—N/a	32%	—N/a	32%	4%
Paraná Pesquisas	28 Nov − 1 Dec	2,036	47%	33.4%	—N/a	—N/a	—N/a	—N/a	—N/a	—N/a	—N/a	19.7%	13.6%
Paraná Pesquisas	28 Nov − 1 Dec	2,036	44.9%	—N/a	—N/a	—N/a	—N/a	—N/a	34.7%	—N/a	—N/a	20.5%	10.2%
Paraná Pesquisas	28 Nov − 1 Dec	2,036	48.5%	—N/a	—N/a	31%	—N/a	—N/a	—N/a	—N/a	—N/a	20.6%	17.5%
Paraná Pesquisas	28 Nov − 1 Dec	2,036	51.1%	—N/a	—N/a	—N/a	—N/a	23.8%	—N/a	—N/a	—N/a	25.1%	27.3%
Paraná Pesquisas	28 Nov − 1 Dec	2,036	48.6%	—N/a	—N/a	—N/a	—N/a	—N/a	—N/a	29.7%	—N/a	21.7%	18.9%
XP/Ipespe	18−20 Nov	1.000	33%	—N/a	—N/a	—N/a	—N/a	—N/a	38%	—N/a	—N/a	28%	5%
XP/Ipespe	18−20 Nov	1.000	43%	—N/a	37%	—N/a	—N/a	—N/a	—N/a	—N/a	—N/a	20%	6%
XP/Ipespe	18−20 Nov	1.000	—N/a	—N/a	25%	—N/a	—N/a	—N/a	46%	—N/a	—N/a	29%	21%
XP/Ipespe	18−20 Nov	1.000	40%	—N/a	—N/a	—N/a	—N/a	—N/a	—N/a	33%	—N/a	27%	7%
XP/Ipespe	18−20 Nov	1.000	42%	—N/a	—N/a	39%	—N/a	—N/a	—N/a	—N/a	—N/a	19%	3%
XP/Ipespe	18−20 Nov	1.000	45%	—N/a	—N/a	—N/a	31%	—N/a	—N/a	—N/a	—N/a	24%	14%
XP/Ipespe	8−11 Oct	1,000	42%	—N/a	—N/a	—N/a	—N/a	—N/a	—N/a	—N/a	30% (Note: Luiz Henrique Mandetta (DEM) with 30%)	28%	12%
XP/Ipespe	8−11 Oct	1,000	43%	—N/a	—N/a	35%	—N/a	—N/a	—N/a	—N/a	—N/a	22%	8%
XP/Ipespe	8−11 Oct	1,000	42%	—N/a	—N/a	—N/a	—N/a	—N/a	—N/a	28%	—N/a	30%	14%
XP/Ipespe	8−11 Oct	1,000	43%	—N/a	35%	—N/a	—N/a	—N/a	—N/a	—N/a	—N/a	22%	8%
XP/Ipespe	8−11 Oct	1,000	35%	—N/a	—N/a	—N/a	—N/a	—N/a	36%	—N/a	—N/a	29%	1%
XP/Ipespe	8−11 Oct	1,000	—N/a	—N/a	26%	—N/a	—N/a	—N/a	43%	—N/a	—N/a	31%	17%
Exame/Ideia	5−8 Oct	1,200	43%	33%	—N/a	—N/a	—N/a	—N/a	—N/a	—N/a	—N/a	25%	10%
Exame/Ideia	5−8 Oct	1,200	42%	—N/a	—N/a	—N/a	—N/a	21%	—N/a	—N/a	—N/a	38%	21%
Exame/Ideia	5−8 Oct	1,200	41%	—N/a	—N/a	—N/a	—N/a	—N/a	35%	—N/a	—N/a	25%	6%
PoderData	14−16 Sep	2,500	45%	—N/a	—N/a	—N/a	—N/a	32%	—N/a	—N/a	—N/a	23%	13%
PoderData	14−16 Sep	2,500	48%	—N/a	—N/a	33%	—N/a	—N/a	—N/a	—N/a	—N/a	19%	15%
PoderData	14−16 Sep	2,500	40%	—N/a	—N/a	—N/a	—N/a	—N/a	37%	—N/a	—N/a	23%	3%
PoderData	14−16 Sep	2,500	45%	—N/a	38%	—N/a	—N/a	—N/a	—N/a	—N/a	—N/a	17%	7%
PoderData	14−16 Sep	2,500	41%	41%	—N/a	—N/a	—N/a	—N/a	—N/a	—N/a	—N/a	18%	Tie
Exame/Ideia	24−31 Aug	1,235	42%	31%	—N/a	—N/a	—N/a	—N/a	—N/a	—N/a	—N/a	27%	11%
Exame/Ideia	24−31 Aug	1,235	41%	—N/a	—N/a	—N/a	—N/a	17%	—N/a	—N/a	—N/a	42%	24%
Exame/Ideia	24−31 Aug	1,235	38%	—N/a	—N/a	—N/a	—N/a	—N/a	31%	—N/a	—N/a	31%	7%
PoderData	3–5 Aug	2,500	44%	—N/a	—N/a	—N/a	—N/a	30%	—N/a	—N/a	—N/a	26%	14%
PoderData	3–5 Aug	2,500	42%	—N/a	34%	—N/a	—N/a	—N/a	—N/a	—N/a	—N/a	24%	8%
PoderData	3–5 Aug	2,500	41%	—N/a	—N/a	—N/a	—N/a	—N/a	41%	—N/a	—N/a	18%	Tie
Paraná Pesquisas	18–21 Jul	2,030	46.6%	—N/a	32%	—N/a	—N/a	—N/a	—N/a	—N/a	—N/a	21.4%	14.6%
Paraná Pesquisas	18–21 Jul	2,030	44.7%	—N/a	—N/a	—N/a	—N/a	—N/a	35%	—N/a	—N/a	20.2%	9.7%
Paraná Pesquisas	18–21 Jul	2,030	45.6%	36.4%	—N/a	—N/a	—N/a	—N/a	—N/a	—N/a	—N/a	18%	9.2%
Paraná Pesquisas	18–21 Jul	2,030	48.1%	—N/a	—N/a	31.1%	—N/a	—N/a	—N/a	—N/a	—N/a	20.9%	17%
Paraná Pesquisas	18–21 Jul	2,030	51.7%	—N/a	—N/a	—N/a	—N/a	23%	—N/a	—N/a	—N/a	25.4%	28.7%
Paraná Pesquisas	18–21 Jul	2,030	50.8%	—N/a	—N/a	—N/a	—N/a	—N/a	—N/a	27.6%	—N/a	21.6%	23.2%
Veja/FSB	7–10 Feb	2,000	51%	—N/a	33%	—N/a	—N/a	—N/a	—N/a	—N/a	—N/a	16%	18%
Veja/FSB	7–10 Feb	2,000	50%	—N/a	—N/a	—N/a	—N/a	25%	—N/a	—N/a	—N/a	26%	25%
Veja/FSB	7–10 Feb	2,000	45%	—N/a	—N/a	—N/a	—N/a	—N/a	—N/a	37%	—N/a	17%	8%
Veja/FSB	7–10 Feb	2,000	48%	40%	—N/a	—N/a	—N/a	—N/a	—N/a	—N/a	—N/a	11%	8%
Veja/FSB	7–10 Feb	2,000	37%	—N/a	—N/a	—N/a	—N/a	—N/a	39%	—N/a	—N/a	25%	2%
Veja/FSB	7–10 Feb	2,000	—N/a	—N/a	30%	—N/a	—N/a	—N/a	53%	—N/a	—N/a	17%	23%
Veja/FSB	7–10 Feb	2,000	—N/a	40%	—N/a	—N/a	—N/a	—N/a	49%	—N/a	—N/a	12%	9%
Veja/FSB	7–10 Feb	2,000	—N/a	—N/a	30%	—N/a	—N/a	—N/a	—N/a	37%	—N/a	34%	7%
Veja/FSB	7–10 Feb	2,000	—N/a	—N/a	—N/a	—N/a	—N/a	—N/a	51%	32%	—N/a	16%	19%
2018 general election	28 Oct	—N/a	55.13%	—N/a	44.87%	—N/a		—N/a	—N/a	—N/a	—N/a	—N/a	10.26%

==== 2019 ====
Publisher/Pollster	Polling period	Sample size	Bolsonaro Indep.	Lula PT	Haddad PT	Doria PSDB	Moro PODE	Huck Indep.	Others	Blank/Null/ Undec.	Lead
Quaest	26–27 Dec	1,000	46%	32%	—N/a	—N/a	—N/a	—N/a	—N/a	22%	14%
Veja/FSB	11 Nov – 2 Dec	2,000	45%	40%	—N/a	—N/a	—N/a	—N/a	—N/a	16%	5%
Veja/FSB	11 Nov – 2 Dec	2,000	47%	—N/a	32%	—N/a	—N/a	—N/a	—N/a	21%	15%
Veja/FSB	11 Nov – 2 Dec	2,000	45%	—N/a	—N/a	26%	—N/a	—N/a	—N/a	28%	19%
Veja/FSB	11 Nov – 2 Dec	2,000	44%	—N/a	—N/a	—N/a	—N/a	36%	—N/a	19%	8%
Veja/FSB	11 Nov – 2 Dec	2,000	36%	—N/a	—N/a	—N/a	36%	—N/a	—N/a	28%	Tie
Veja/FSB	11 Nov – 2 Dec	2,000	—N/a	—N/a	29%	—N/a	52%	—N/a	—N/a	18%	23%
Veja/FSB	11 Nov – 2 Dec	2,000	—N/a	39%	—N/a	—N/a	48%	—N/a	—N/a	12%	9%
Veja/FSB	11 Nov – 2 Dec	2,000	—N/a	—N/a	—N/a	—N/a	50%	31%	—N/a	18%	19%
Veja/FSB	11 Nov – 2 Dec	2,000	—N/a	—N/a	29%	—N/a	—N/a	39%	—N/a	33%	10%
Veja/FSB	11–14 Oct	2,000	47%	—N/a	34%	—N/a	—N/a	—N/a	—N/a	20%	13%
Veja/FSB	11–14 Oct	2,000	46%	—N/a	—N/a	26%	—N/a	—N/a	—N/a	29%	20%
Veja/FSB	11–14 Oct	2,000	46%	38%	—N/a	—N/a	—N/a	—N/a	—N/a	17%	8%
Veja/FSB	11–14 Oct	2,000	43%	—N/a	—N/a	—N/a	—N/a	39%	—N/a	19%	7%
Veja/FSB	16–18 Aug	2,000	48%	—N/a	35%	—N/a	—N/a	—N/a	—N/a	18%	13%
Veja/FSB	16–18 Aug	2,000	45%	—N/a	—N/a	29%	—N/a	—N/a	—N/a	23%	16%
Veja/FSB	16–18 Aug	2,000	—N/a	—N/a	37%	33%	—N/a	—N/a	—N/a	31%	4%
2018 general election	28 Oct	—N/a	55.13%	—N/a	44.87%	—N/a	—N/a	—N/a	—N/a	—N/a	10.26%

== See also ==
- President of Brazil
- Opinion polling for the 2026 Brazilian presidential election
- Opinion polling for the 2018 Brazilian general election
- Opinion polling on the Jair Bolsonaro presidency
