= Opinion polling on the Jair Bolsonaro presidency =

Surveying on Brazilian administration

Opinion polling has been regularly conducted in Brazil since the start of Jair Bolsonaro's four-year term administration, gauging public support for the President of Brazil and his government. Typically, an approval rating is based on responses to a poll in which a sample of people are asked to evaluate the overall administration of the current president. Participants might also be asked whether they approve of the way president handles his job, if they trust him, to rate his personality, or to opine on various policies promoted by the government.

== Overall administration evaluation ==
The public was asked to evaluate the performance of Bolsonaro's administration. A question might ask:

The administration of President Jair Bolsonaro has been excellent, good, regular, bad, or terrible?

plurality approval neutral evaluation plurality disapproval majority disapproval

Polling group	Date	Sample size	Good / Excellent	Regular	Bad / Terrible	Unsure / No opinion	Net ±								
Polling group	Date	Sample size	Good / Excellent	Regular	Bad / Terrible	Unsure / No opinion	Net ±	Datafolha	19–20 December 2022	2,026	39%	24%	37%	1%	+2%
Polling group	Date	Sample size	Good / Excellent	Regular	Bad / Terrible	Unsure / No opinion	Net ±	IPEC	26–28 August 2022	2,000	31%	24%	43%	2%	–12%
2022
Poder360	17–19 July	3,000	34%	14%	50%	2%	–16%								
Exame/Ideia	17–22 June	1,500	33%	21%	44%	1%	–11%								
Paraná Pesquisas	31 March–5 April	2,020	32.4%	20.8%	45.8%	1%	–13.4%								
Datafolha	22–23 March	2,556	25%	28%	46%	1%	–21%								
Exame/Ideia	18–23 March	1,500	28%	24%	45%	3%	–17%								
XP/Ipespe	7–9 March	1,000	27%	20%	52%	1%	–25%								
Paraná Pesquisas	3–8 March	2,020	28.1%	23.7%	47%	1,3%	–18.9%								
PoderData	27 February – 1 March	3,000	30%	16%	52%	2%	–22%								
CNT/MDA	16–19 February	2,002	25.9%	30,4%	42.7%	1%	–16.8%								
XP/Ipespe	10–12 January	1,000	24%	21%	54%	7%	−30%								
2021
IPEC	9–13 December	2,002	19%	25%	55%	1%	−36%								
Exame/Ideia	18–22 November	1,277	23%	19%	55%	2%	−32%								
Exame/Ideia	9–11 November	1,200	23%	20%	54%	3%	−31%								
PoderData	13–15 September	2,500	27%	14%	56%	3%	−29%								
Atlas Político	30 August – 4 September	3,246	24%	14%	61%	1%	−37%								
PoderData	16–18 August	2,500	28%	13%	56%	3%	−28%								
XP/Ipespe	11–14 August	1,000	20%	23%	54%	2%	−34%								
Exame/Ideia	12–15 July	1,258	26%	20%	51%	1%	−25%								
Datafolha	7–8 July	2,074	24%	24%	51%	1%	−27%								
XP/Ipespe	5–7 July	1,000	25%	21%	52%	3%	−27%								
Exame/Ideia	28 June – 1 July	1,248	23%	21%	54%	3%	−31%								
IPEC	17–21 June	2,002	23%	26%	50%	1%	−27%								
XP/Ipespe	7–10 June	1,000	26%	22%	50%	2%	−24%								
Datafolha	11–12 May	2,071	24%	30%	45%	1%	−21%								
Exame/Ideia	19–22 April	1,200	25%	20%	54%	1%	−29%								
PoderData	12–14 April	3,500	26%	18%	55%	1%	−29%								
XP/Ipespe	29–31 March	1,000	27%	24%	48%	1%	−21%								
PoderData	29–31 March	3,500	26%	19%	53%	2%	−27%								
Exame/Ideia	22−24 March	1,255	25%	22%	49%	2%	−24%								
Datafolha	15−16 March	2,023	30%	24%	44%	2%	−14%								
XP/Ipespe	9–11 March	1,000	30%	24%	45%	1%	−15%								
Exame/Ideia	8–11 March	1,200	26%	25%	45%	3%	−19%								
PoderData	1–3 March,	2,500	31%	18%	47%	4%	−16%								
Paraná Pesquisas	25 February – 1 March	2,080	34%	23.7%	40.6%	1.7%	−6.6%								
CNT/MDA	18–20 February	2,002	32.9%	30.2%	35.5%	1.4%	−2.6%								
Exame/Ideia	11 February	1,200	31%	24%	43%	2%	−12%								
PoderData	1–3 February	2,500	33%	22%	41%	4%	−8%								
Datafolha	20–21 January	2,030	31%	26%	40%	2%	−9%								
Paraná Pesquisas	22–26 January	2,002	33.3%	25.4%	39.6%	1.6%	−6.3%								
Exame/Ideia	18–21 January	1,200	27%	26%	45%	2%	−8%								
XP/Ipespe	11–14 January	1,000	32%	26%	40%	2%	−8%								
EXAME/IDEIA	11–14 January	1,200	37%	27%	37%	2%	0%								
2020
PoderData	21–23 December	2,500	39%	17%	42%	2%	−3%								
Datafolha	8–10 December	2,016	37%	29%	32%	3%	+5%								
XP Investimentos	7–9 December	1,000	38%	25%	35%	2%	+3%								
CNI/Ibope	5–8 December	2,000	35%	30%	33%	2%	+2%								
Paraná Pesquisas	28 November – 1 December	2,036	37.2%	24.4%	37.3%	1.2%	−0.1%								
PoderData	23–25 November	2,500	36%	19%	40%	5%	−4%								
CNT/MDA	21–24 October	2,002	41%	30%	27%	1,3%	+14%								
XP Investimentos	8–11 October	1,000	39%	28%	31%	2%	+8%								
Exame/IDEIA	5–8 October	1,200	36%	25%	37%	2%	−1%								
Band/PoderData	28–30 September	2,500	38%	27%	30%	5%	+8%								
CNI/Ibope	17–20 September	2,000	40%	29%	29%	2%	+11%								
Band/PoderData	14–16 September	2,500	38%	25%	34%	3%	+4%								
XP Investimentos	8–11 September	1,000	39%	24%	36%	2%	+3%								
Band/PoderData	31 August – 2 September	2,500	39%	24%	34%	3%	+5%								
Exame/IDEIA	24–31 August	1,235	39%	20%	39%	2%	0%								
XP/Ipespe	13–15 August	1,000	37%	23%	37%	3%	0%								
Datafolha	11–12 August	2,065	37%	27%	34%	1%	+3%								
PoderData	3–5 August	2,500	32%	25%	41%	2%	−9%								
DataPoder360	20–22 July	2,500	30%	23%	43%	4%	−13%								
Datafolha	23–24 June	2,016	32%	23%	44%	1%	−12%								
XP/Ipespe	9–11 June	1,000	28%	22%	48%	2%	−20%								
DataPoder360	8–10 June	2,500	28%	20%	47%	5%	−19%								
XP/Ipespe	26–27 May	1,000	26%	23%	49%	2%	−23%								
DataPoder360	25–27 May	2,500	28%	23%	44%	5%	−16%								
Datafolha	25–26 May	2,069	33%	22%	43%	2%	−10%								
XP/Ipespe	16–18 May	1,000	25%	23%	50%	2%	−25%								
Fórum/Offerwise	14–17 May	1,000	32.0%	24.9%	39.5%	3.6%	−7.5%								
DataPoder360	11–13 May	2,500	30%	27%	39%	4%	−9%								
CNT/MDA	7–10 May	2,002	32.0%	22.9%	43.4%	1.7%	−11.4%								
XP/Ipespe	28–30 April	1,000	27%	24%	49%	1%	−22%								
Paraná Pesquisas	27–29 April	2,006	31.8%	27.3%	39.4%	1.6%	−7.6%								
DataPoder360	27–29 April	2,500	29%	26%	40%	5%	−11%								
Datafolha	27 April	1,503	33%	26%	38%	3%	−5%								
XP/Ipespe	23–24 April	800	31%	24%	42%	3%	−11%								
XP/Ipespe	20–22 April	1,000	31%	26%	42%	2%	−11%								
XP/Ipespe	13–15 April	1,000	30%	26%	40%	3%	−10%								
DataPoder360	13–15 April	2,500	36%	28%	33%	3%	+3%								
XP/Ipespe	30 March – 1 April	1,000	28%	27%	42%	3%	−14%								
XP/Ipespe	16–18 March	1,000	30%	31%	36%	3%	−6%								
XP/Ipespe	17–19 February	1,000	34%	29%	36%	2%	−2%								
CNT/MDA	15–18 January	2,002	34.5%	32.1%	31.0%	2.4%	+3.5%								
XP/Ipespe	13–15 January	1,000	32%	28%	39%	1%	−7%								
2019
XP/Ipespe	9–11 December	1,000	35%	25%	39%	1%	−4%								
Ibope	5–8 December	2,000	29%	31%	38%	3%	−9%								
Datafolha	5–6 December	2,948	30%	32%	36%	1%	−6%								
XP/Ipespe	6–8 November	1,000	35%	25%	39%	2%	−4%								
XP/Ipespe	9–11 October	1,000	33%	27%	38%	1%	−5%								
Ibope	19–22 September	2,000	31%	32%	34%	3%	−3%								
Datafolha	29–30 August	2,878	29%	30%	38%	2%	−9%								
XP/Ipespe	27–29 August	1,000	30%	27%	41%	2%	−11%								
CNT/MDA	22–25 August	2,002	29.4%	29.1%	39.5%	2.0%	−10.1%								
XP/Ipespe	5–7 August	1,000	33%	27%	38%	2%	−5%								
Datafolha	4–5 July	2,086	33%	31%	33%	2%	0%								
XP/Ipespe	1–3 July	1,000	34%	28%	35%	4%	−1%								
Paraná Pesquisas	20–25 June	2,102	30.1%	26.9%	40.8%	2.2%	−10.7%								
Ibope	20–23 June	2,000	32%	32%	32%	3%	0%								
XP/Ipespe	11–13 June	1,000	34%	28%	35%	3%	−1%								
XP/Ipespe	20–21 May	1,000	34%	26%	36%	4%	−2%								
XP/Ipespe	6–8 May	1,000	35%	31%	31%	3%	+4%								
Ibope	12–15 April	2,000	35%	31%	27%	7%	+8%								
Datafolha	2–3 April	2,086	32%	33%	30%	4%	+1%								
XP/Ipespe	1–3 April	1,000	35%	32%	26%	7%	+9%								
Ibope	16–19 March	2,002	34%	34%	24%	8%	0%								
XP/Ipespe	11–13 March	1,000	37%	32%	24%	8%	+13%								
Ibope	22–25 February	2,002	39%	30%	19%	12%	+20%								
CNT/MDA	21–23 February	2,002	38.9%	29.0%	19.0%	13.1%	+19.9%								
XP/Ipespe	11–13 February	1,000	40%	32%	17%	11%	+23%								
Ibope	24–28 January	2,002	49%	26%	11%	14%	+38%								
XP/Ipespe	9–11 January	1,000	40%	29%	20%	11%	+20%								

Results may not always add to 100% due rounding methodology employed by various polling groups.

Polling aggregates
- Government evaluation
- Good/Excellent
- Regular
- Bad/Terrible
- Unsure/No opinion

== Presidential approval ratings ==
The public was asked whether they approved or disapproved of the way Jair Bolsonaro governs Brazil.

Polling group	Date	Sample size	Approves	Disapproves	Unsure / No opinion	Net ±							
Polling group	Date	Sample size	Approves	Disapproves	Unsure / No opinion	Net ±	IPEC	26–28 August 2022	2,000	38%	57%	2%	-19%
Poder360	17–19 July 2022	3,000	41%	55%	4%	-14%							
Paraná Pesquisas	31 March – 5 April 2022	2,020	41.8%	54.4%	3.8%	-12.6%							
Exame/Ideia	18–23 March 2022	1,500	32%	44%	22%	-12%							
Paraná Pesquisas	3–8 March 2022	2,020	39.3%	56.0%	4.7%	-18.9%							
XP/Ipespe	7–9 March 2022	1,000	32%	63%	5%	-31%							
CNT/MDA	16–19 February 2022	2,002	33.9%	61.4%	1%	-27.5%							
PoderData	27 February–1 March 2022	3,000	37%	53%	11%	−16%							
XP/Ipespe	10 January–12, 2022	1,000	30%	64%	7%	−34%							
IPEC	9–13 December 2021	2,002	27%	68%	4%	−41%							
XP/Ipespe	25–28 October 2021	1,000	30%	64%	6%	−34%							
PoderData	13–15 September 2021	2,500	29%	62%	9%	−33%							
Atlas Político	30 August–4 September 2021	3,246	35%	64%	1%	−29%							
PoderData	16–18 August 2021	2,500	31%	64%	5%	−33%							
XP/Ipespe	5–7 July 2021	1,000	31%	63%	6%	−32%							
CNT/MDA	1–3 July 2021	2,002	33,8%	62.5%	3,7%	−28.7%							
Poder360	24–26 May 2021	2,500	35%	59%	6%	−24%							
PoderData	12–14 April 2021	3,500	34%	56%	10%	−22%							
XP/Ipespe	29–31 March 2021	1,000	33%	60%	7%	−27%							
PoderData/Poder360	29–31 March 2021	3,500	33%	59%	8%	−26%							
Atlas Político	8–10 March 2021	3,721	35%	60%	5%	−25%							
PoderData	1–3 March 2021	2,500	40%	51%	9%	−11%							
PoderData	1–3 February 2021	2,500	40%	48%	12%	−8%							
PoderData	3–5 August 2020	2,500	45%	45%	5%	–							
DataPoder360	8–10 June 2020	2,500	41%	50%	9%	−9%							
CNT/MDA	7–10 May 2020	2,002	39.2%	55.4%	5.4%	−16.2%							
Paraná Pesquisas	27–29 April 2020	2,006	44.0%	51.7%	4.3%	−7.7%							
CNT/MDA	15–18 January 2020	2,002	47.8%	47.0%	5.2%	+0.8%							
Ibope	5–8 December 2019	2,000	41%	53%	6%	−12%							
Ibope	19–22 September 2019	2,000	44%	50%	6%	−6%							
CNT/MDA	22–25 August 2019	2,002	41.0%	53.7%	5.3%	−12.7%							
Paraná Pesquisas	20–25 June 2019	2,102	43.7%	51.0%	5.3%	−7.3%							
Ibope	20–23 June 2019	2,000	46%	48%	5%	−2%							
Ibope	12–15 April 2019	2,000	51%	40%	9%	+11%							
Ibope	16–19 March 2019	2,002	51%	38%	9%	+13%							
Ibope	22–25 February 2019	2,002	57%	31%	12%	+26%							
CNT/MDA	21–23 February 2019	2,002	57.5%	28.2%	14.3%	+29.3%							
Ibope	24–28 January 2019	2,002	67%	21%	12%	+46%							

majority approval plurality approval majority disapproval plurality disapproval

Results may not always add to 100% due rounding methodology employed by various polling groups.

Polling aggregates
- Government evaluation
- Approves
- Disapproves
- Unsure/No opinion

== Public trust in Bolsonaro ==
The public was asked whether they trusted Jair Bolsonaro.

Polling group	Date	Sample size	Trusts	Does not trust	Unsure / No opinion	Net ±							
Polling group	Date	Sample size	Trusts	Does not trust	Unsure / No opinion	Net ±	Datafolha	17 December 2021	3,666	39%	60%	1%	−21%
Ibope	5–8 December 2020	2,000	44%	53%	3%	−9%							
Ibope	17–20 September 2020	2,000	46%	51%	3%	−5%							
Ibope	5–8 December 2019	2,000	41%	56%	4%	−15%							
Ibope	19–22 September 2019	2,000	42%	55%	3%	−13%							
Ibope	20–23 June 2019	2,000	46%	51%	3%	−5%							
Ibope	12–15 April 2019	2,000	51%	45%	4%	+6%							
Ibope	16–19 March 2019	2,002	49%	44%	6%	+5%							
Ibope	22–25 February 2019	2,002	55%	38%	7%	+17%							
Ibope	24–28 January 2019	2,002	62%	30%	7%	+32%							

majority approval plurality approval majority disapproval plurality disapproval

Results may not always add to 100% due rounding methodology employed by various polling groups.

Polling aggregates
- Public trust
- Trusts
- Doesn't trust
- Unsure/No opinion

== Issue-specific support ==
=== COVID-19 ===
The public was asked to evaluate the performance of Jair Bolsonaro in relation to the COVID-19 pandemic. A question might ask:

How do you evaluate the performance of President Jair Bolsonaro in relation to the coronavirus outbreak: excellent, good, regular, bad, or terrible?

plurality approval neutral evaluation plurality disapproval majority disapproval

Polling group	Date	Sample size	Good / Excellent	Regular	Bad / Terrible	Unsure / No opinion	Net ±								
Polling group	Date	Sample size	Good / Excellent	Regular	Bad / Terrible	Unsure / No opinion	Net ±	Datafolha	13–15 September 2021	1,000	22%	22%	54%	2%	−32%
XP/Ipespe	29–31 March 2021	1,000	21%	19%	58%	3%	−37%								
Datafolha	15–16 March 2021	2,023	22%	24%	54%	1%	−32%								
XP/Ipespe	9–11 March 2021	1,000	18%	18%	61%	3%	−43%								
XP/Ipespe	2–4 February 2021	1,000	22%	22%	53%	2%	−31%								
XP/Ipespe	11–14 January 2021	1,000	23%	21%	52%	3%	−29%								
XP/Ipespe	13–15 July 2020	1,000	25%	21%	52%	3%	−27%								
XP/Ipespe	9–11 June 2020	1,000	23%	20%	55%	3%	−32%								
XP/Ipespe	26–27 May 2020	1,000	20%	22%	55%	3%	−35%								
Datafolha	25–26 May 2020	2,069	27%	22%	50%	1%	−23%								
XP/Ipespe	16–18 May 2020	1,000	21%	19%	58%	3%	−37%								
Fórum/Offerwise	14–17 May 2020	1,000	28.5%	22.3%	46.3%	3.0%	−17.8%								
XP/Ipespe	28–30 April 2020	1,000	23%	22%	54%	1%	−31%								
DataPoder360	27–29 April 2020	2,500	24%	29%	43%	4%	−19%								
Datafolha	27 April 2020	1,503	27%	25%	45%	3%	−18%								
XP/Ipespe	20–22 April 2020	1,000	30%	20%	48%	2%	−18%								
Datafolha	17 April 2020	1,606	36%	23%	38%	3%	−2%								
XP/Ipespe	13–15 April 2020	1,000	29%	25%	44%	2%	−15%								
DataPoder360	13–15 April 2020	2,500	34%	27%	37%	2%	−3%								
Fórum/Offerwise	8–11 April 2020	956	38.9%	23.0%	35.4%	2.7%	+3.5%								
Datafolha	1–3 April 2020	1,511	33%	25%	39%	2%	−6%								
XP/Ipespe	30 March–1 April 2020	1,000	29%	21%	44%	6%	−15%								
Datafolha	18–20 March 2020	1,558	35%	26%	33%	5%	+2%								
XP/Ipespe	16–18 March 2020	1,000	41%	33%	18%	8%	+23%								

Results may not always add to 100% due rounding methodology employed by various polling groups.

Polling aggregates
- Government evaluation
- Good/Excellent
- Regular
- Bad/Terrible
- Unsure/No opinion

=== Gun control ===
Loosening gun control laws was one of Bolsonaro's major campaign promises during the 2018 Brazilian general election. The changes were first signed it into a decree in May. In March 2019, an Ibope survey asked the public whether they approved of the policy and related questions. Polls conducted by Datafolha and Paraná Pesquisas presented similar findings.

Should gun control laws be loosened?

Are you favorable to (any kind of) carry^{a}?

Does having a gun at home make it safer?

Does carrying a gun make someone safer?

Does increasing the number of armed people make society safer?

== See also ==
- 2018 Brazilian general election
- 2022 Brazilian general election
- Opinion polling for the 2018 Brazilian general election
- Opinion polling for the 2022 Brazilian general election
- Presidency of Jair Bolsonaro

== Notes ==
a. The question does not distinguish between open and concealed carry, as Brazilian laws at the time of the research made no distinction between them, only asking if participant is favorable to people carrying guns in their daily lives.
