= Jair Bolsonaro =

President of Brazil from 2019 to 2023

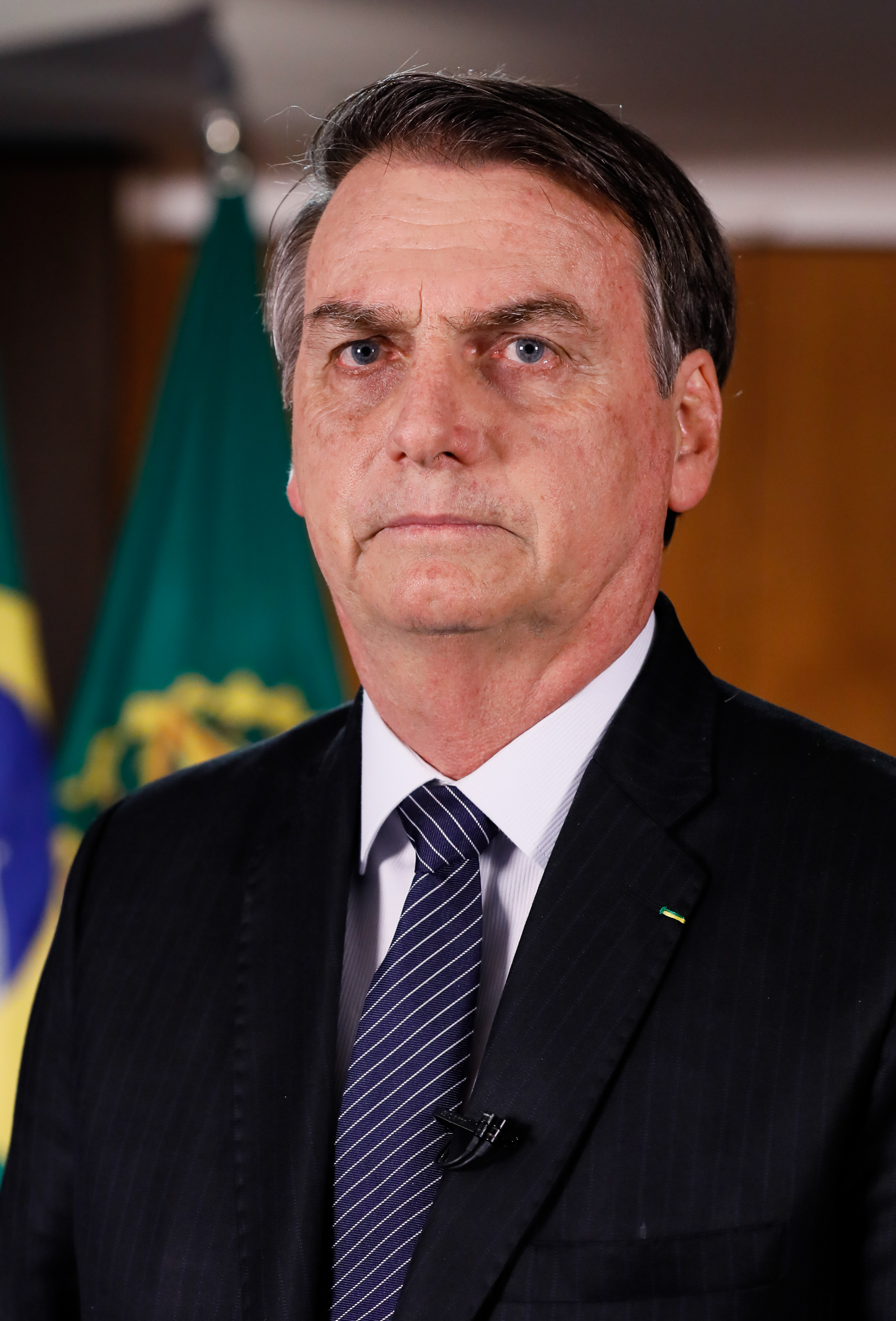
- Bolsonaro in 2019

38th President of Brazil
- In office 1 January 2019 – 1 January 2023
- Vice President: Hamilton Mourão
- Preceded by: Michel Temer
- Succeeded by: Luiz Inácio Lula da Silva

Member of the Chamber of Deputies
- In office 1 February 1991 – 1 January 2019
- Constituency: Rio de Janeiro

Councillor of Rio de Janeiro
- In office 1 January 1989 – 31 January 1991
- Constituency: At-large

Personal details
- Born: Jair Messias Bolsonaro; 21 March 1955 (age 71) Glicério, São Paulo, Brazil
- Party: PL (since 2021)
- Other political affiliations: See list: Independent (2019–2021); PSL (2018–2019); PSC (2016–2018); PP (2005–2016); PFL (2005); PTB (2003–2005); PP (1995–2003); PPR (1993–1995); PP (1993); PDC (1988–1993)
- Spouses: Rogéria Nantes Braga (m. 1978; div. 1997) Ana Cristina Valle (m. 1997; div. 2007) Michelle de Paula (m. 2007)
- Children: 5, including Flávio, Carlos, Eduardo and Jair Renan
- Education: Military Academy of Agulhas Negras
- Awards: Order of Rio Branco Order of Defence Merit Order of Military Merit (Brazil) Order of Naval Merit (Brazil) Order of Aeronautical Merit (Brazil) Order of Labour Judicial Merit Order of Military Judicial Merit Mauá Medal of Merit Peacemaker Medal (Brazil)

Military service
- Allegiance: Brazil
- Branch/service: Brazilian Army
- Years of service: 1973–1988
- Rank: Captain
- Commands: 21st Field Artillery Group; 9th Field Artillery Group; 8th Parachutist Field Artillery Group
- Bolsonaro's voice Bolsonaro refusing to elaborate on his defeat in the 2022 Brazilian presidential election Recorded 1 November 2022

Jair Messias Bolsonaro (Brazilian Portuguese: [ʒaˈiʁ meˈsi.ɐz bowsoˈnaɾu]; born 21 March 1955) is a Brazilian politician and former military officer who served as the 38th president of Brazil from 2019 to 2023. He previously served as a member of the Chamber of Deputies from 1991 to 2019.

Born in Glicério, São Paulo, Bolsonaro began serving in the Brazilian Army in 1973 and graduated from the Military Academy of Agulhas Negras in 1977. He attracted publicity in 1986, after he wrote an article for Veja magazine criticizing the low wages of military officers, after which he was arrested and detained for fifteen days. He left the army, and was elected to the Municipal Chamber of Rio de Janeiro two years later. In 1990, he was first elected to the Chamber of Deputies as a representative for the state of Rio de Janeiro. During his 27-year tenure as a congressman, he became known for his national conservatism. Bolsonaro entered the 2018 presidential election, during which he began claiming to support economically liberal and pro-market policies. After surviving an assassination attempt on 6 September, he led in the 7 October first-round results and defeated Fernando Haddad in the 28 October runoff.

Bolsonaro focused on domestic affairs in his first months as president, dealing primarily with the fallout of the 2014 Brazilian economic crisis. The economy recovered slowly, while crime rates fell sharply during the first year. His government passed a major pension reform, granted formal autonomy to the Central Bank and privatized Eletrobras. It also reduced bureaucratic requirements for businesses and approved a new legal framework for sanitation that opened the sector to private investment. He rolled back protections for Indigenous groups in the Amazon rainforest and facilitated its deforestation. Bolsonaro's response to the COVID-19 pandemic in Brazil received significant criticism after he sought to downplay the pandemic and its effects, opposed quarantine measures, and dismissed two health ministers, while the death toll increased rapidly.

A polarizing politician, Bolsonaro has drawn both praise and criticism in Brazil for his views and comments, which have been described by pundits and analysts as far-right and populist. He is a vocal opponent of same-sex marriage, abortion, affirmative action, drug decriminalization, and immigration. In foreign policy, he has advocated closer relations with Israel and with the United States; later in his presidency, he also made efforts to improve relations with the BRICS countries.

In the 2022 general election Bolsonaro lost to Luiz Inácio Lula da Silva. On 8 January 2023, a mob of Bolsonaro's supporters stormed federal government buildings, calling for a coup d'état. On 30 June, the Superior Electoral Court blocked Bolsonaro from seeking office until 2030 for attempting to undermine the validity of the election through his unfounded claims of voter fraud, and for abusing his power by using government communication channels to both promote his campaign and to allege fraud. Testimony from military officials showed that Bolsonaro had planned a self-coup with the military to keep himself in power.

In November 2024, Bolsonaro was indicted by the Federal Police of Brazil on multiple counts related to the planned coup. He was charged in February 2025, and the Supreme Court ruled he must stand trial. On 4 August 2025, he was placed under house arrest for using a mobile phone and accessing social media via his son Eduardo, violating pre-trial rules. His trial began on 2 September; on 11 September he was found guilty by the Supreme Federal Court and sentenced to 27 years and 3 months in prison. On 22 November 2025, Bolsonaro was arrested by the Federal Police after trying to remove his electronic ankle monitor. On 25 November 2025, the Supreme Court rejected his final appeals, declared the case to have reached res judicata and ordered the beginning of the enforcement of the prison sentence. On 24 March 2026, he was granted 90 days of temporary house arrest due to health issues, which was later extended.

== Early life ==
Jair Messias Bolsonaro was born on 21 March 1955 in Glicério, São Paulo, in southeast Brazil, to Percy Geraldo Bolsonaro and Olinda Bonturi. His family is mostly of Italian descent, with German ancestry as well. On his father's side, he is the great-grandson of Italians from Veneto and Calabria. Bolsonaro's paternal grandfather's family comes from Veneto, more precisely Anguillara Veneta, in the province of Padua. His great-grandfather Vittorio Bolzonaro (the surname was originally written with a "z"), was born on 12 April 1878.

Vittorio's parents immigrated to Brazil when he was ten, together with his siblings, Giovanna and Tranquillo. His German ancestry came from his father's maternal grandfather, Carl "Carlos" Hintze, born in Hamburg around 1876, who immigrated to Brazil in 1883. His maternal grandparents were born in Lucca, in Tuscany, and went to live in Brazil in the 1890s. On 21 January 2022 his mother, Olinda Bonturi Bolsonaro, died at age 94. His father, Percy Geraldo Bolsonaro, died in 1995.

Bolsonaro spent most of his childhood moving around São Paulo with his family, living in Ribeira, Jundiaí, and Sete Barras, before settling in Eldorado, in the state's southern region, in 1966, where he grew up with his five siblings. His first name is a tribute to Jair da Rosa Pinto, a football player for Palmeiras, with whom he shares a birthday.

== Military career ==
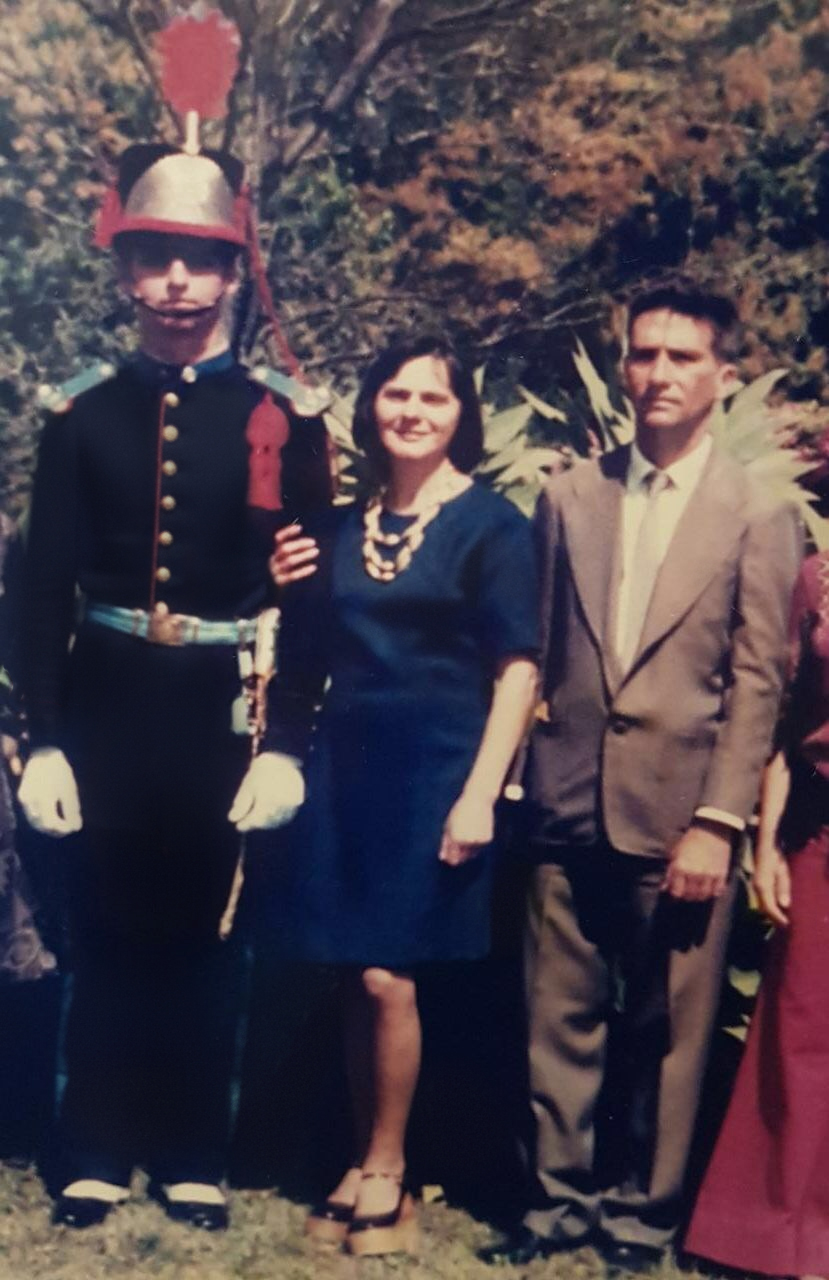
Jair (left) with his parents at the Military Academy of Agulhas Negras in 1979

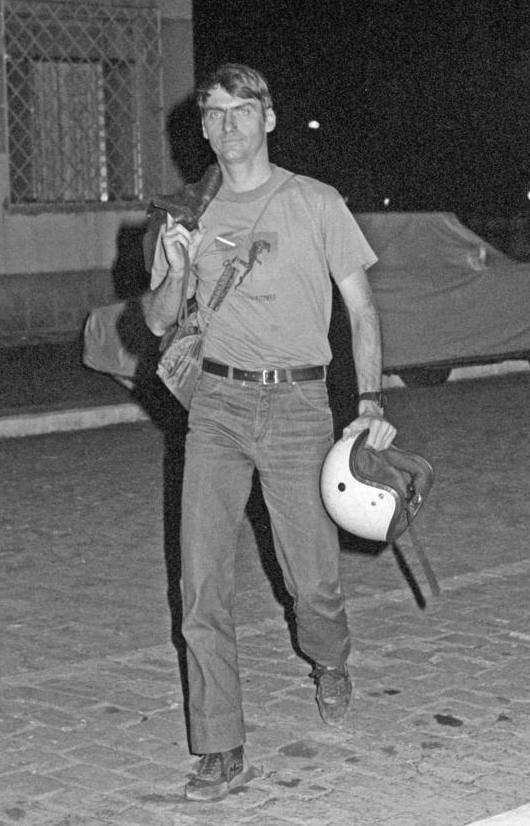
Bolsonaro in 1986

In his final years in high school Bolsonaro was admitted to the Escola Preparatória de Cadetes do Exército (the prep school of the Brazilian Army), which he entered in 1973. In 1974 he went to the Military Academy of Agulhas Negras (Brazil's premier military academy), graduating in 1977 as an artillery officer. He served in the 9th Field Artillery Group, in Nioaque, Mato Grosso do Sul.

Later, he studied at the Army Physical Training School in Rio de Janeiro and served in the 21st Field Artillery Group and the 8th Paratrooper Field Artillery Group, from the Paratrooper Brigade, also based in Rio. His superior officers described him as "aggressive" and criticized his "excessive ambition for financial and economic gain". This assessment referred to Bolsonaro's attempt to mine gold in Bahia, though he later claimed the activity was merely a "hobby and mental hygiene".

In 1987 he studied in the Officers Improvement School, where he completed the Artillery Advanced Course. Bolsonaro first caught the public's attention in 1986 when he wrote an article published in the news magazine Veja. He complained about low military salaries and claimed that the High Command was dismissing officers due to budgetary cuts, not because they were displaying "deviations of conduct", as the command had told the press. Despite being reprimanded by his superiors, Bolsonaro received praise from fellow officers and wives of military men, becoming a household name for supporters who were growing disenchanted with Brazil's new civilian democratic government.

In October 1987, Bolsonaro faced a new accusation. Veja reported that, with an Army colleague, he had plans to plant bombs in military units in Rio de Janeiro. After Bolsonaro called the allegation "a fantasy", the magazine published, in its next issue, sketches allegedly made by Bolsonaro in which the plan was detailed. Official records unearthed by the newspaper O Estado de S. Paulo in 2018 detailed the case. After an investigation by an administrative military bureau called a Justification Board, Bolsonaro was unanimously found guilty. According to the board, Bolsonaro had a "serious personality deviation and a professional deformation", "lack of moral courage to leave the Army" and "lied throughout the process" when denying frequent contacts with Veja.

The Supreme Military Court then analysed the case. The general in charge of reporting the case voted to acquit Bolsonaro, arguing that he had already been penalized for the initial Veja article, that there was no testimonial evidence of his plans to plant bombs, and that there were "deep contradictions in the four graphological exams", two of which failed to conclude that Bolsonaro was the author of the sketches. Bolsonaro was acquitted by the majority of the court (9 v 4 votes). In December 1988, just after this ruling, he left the Army to begin his political career. He served in the military for 15 years, reaching the rank of captain.

== Early political career ==
=== City councilor in Rio de Janeiro (1989–1991) ===
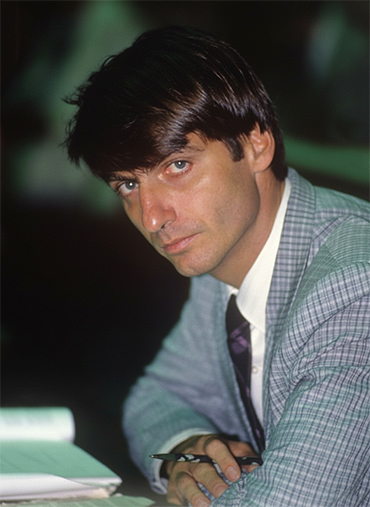
Bolsonaro as Rio de Janeiro city councilor in March 1990. In October of the same year, he was elected as a federal deputy for the city.

Bolsonaro entered politics in 1988, when he was elected to serve as a city councilor in Rio de Janeiro, representing the Christian Democratic Party (PDC). According to the biography by his son Flávio, Bolsonaro "was a candidate for councilor because it happened to be the only option he had at the moment to avoid persecution by some superiors. His entry into politics happened by chance, for his desire was to continue in his military career".

Bolsonaro spent only two years in the Municipal Chamber of Rio de Janeiro. He was described as a quiet, discreet and conservative councilor, and showed little participation. His term as councilor was used mainly to give visibility to military causes, such as retirement benefits for former officers.

=== Federal deputy for Rio de Janeiro (1991–2018) ===
In the 1990 Brazilian parliamentary election Bolsonaro was elected a federal deputy for the Christian Democratic Party. He served seven consecutive terms, from 1991 to 2018. He was affiliated with several other political parties over the years. In 2014, he was the congressman who gained the most votes in Rio de Janeiro, with 465,000.

Bolsonaro's name was listed on the "Lista de Furnas", a list detailing a corruption and money laundering scheme involving the state-owned electricity company, Eletrobras Furnas. He received housing assistance for deputies who do not have residences in the capital Brasília, despite having an apartment in the southwest of the city. H later admitted that he considers this practice of his "immoral". He has also been accused of engaging in fuel allowance fraud.

In his 27 years of service in the National Congress, Bolsonaro put forward one constitutional amendment and at least 171 bills, two of which became law. Bolsonaro, who claimed to be persecuted by the left-wing parties, said most congressmen do not vote according to their agenda, but "by who the author of the bill is".

In January 2018 he abandoned the Social Christian Party and switched to the Social Liberal Party (PSL). After his arrival, the PSL adopted conservative and right-wing positions, and its social liberal group Livres announced its departure from the PSL.

== Presidential campaign (2018) ==
On 22 July 2018, the PSL nominated Bolsonaro for president in the 2018 election. The Brazilian Labour Renewal Party also endorsed him. His coalition name was "Brazil above everything, God above everyone" (Brasil acima de tudo, Deus acima de todos). Though contested by two lawsuits, the Superior Electoral Court of Brazil deferred them and his candidacy was made official on 6 August. In August Bolsonaro announced that Antônio Hamilton Mourão, a retired army general, would be his running mate.

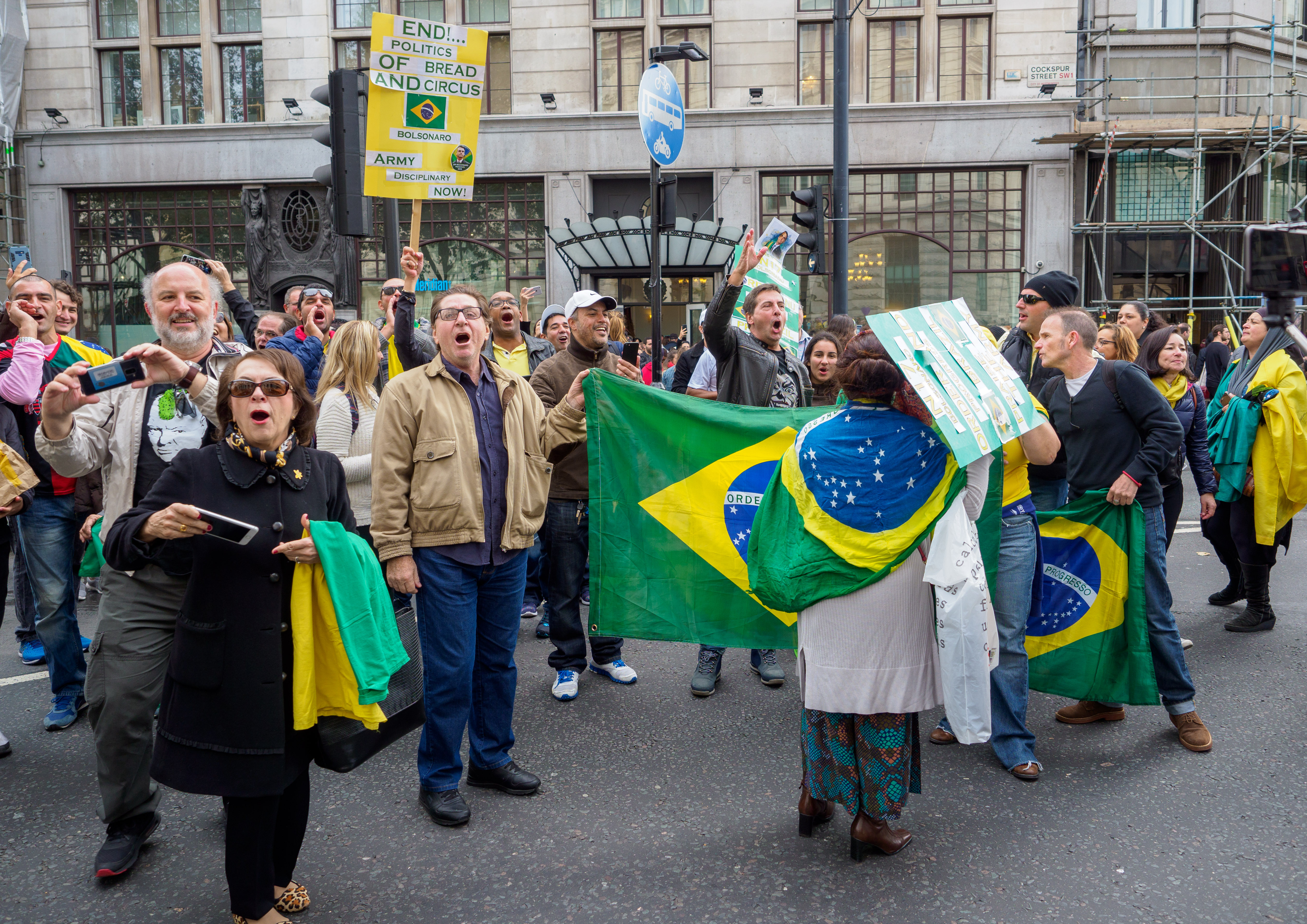
Bolsonaro supporters in London, October 2018

According to political pundits, Bolsonaro moderated his tone early in the campaign, taking a less aggressive and confrontational style. Economically, he started to support less government intervention in the economy (in contrast to the past, when he defended developmentalist policies). On the other hand, he maintained his tough stance on crime and his defence of "traditional family values". Bolsonaro also said he planned to cut taxes across the board, particularly on inheritances and businesses, to generate growth and tackle unemployment.

He also promised more austerity measures and cuts in government spending, but had difficulty naming the areas where he would make cuts. He also said he would work to diminish the federal government's size and bureaucracy by enacting a wide variety of deregulation measures. Bolsonaro's promises to restore security amid record high crime and to stamp out Brazil's rampant political corruption won him huge popular support. In October, he announced he would name Paulo Guedes, a liberal economist, as his finance minister.

On 9 August 2018 Bolsonaro attended the first presidential debate of the year, organized by the TV network Rede Bandeirantes. A week later, there was another debate at RedeTV! On 28 August he gave an interview to Jornal Nacional, Brazil's highest-rated primetime news programme, at Rede Globo. Bolsonaro was the first presidential candidate to raise over R$1 million in donations from the public during the 2018 campaign. In the first 59 days, he amassed an average of R$17,000 per day.

After the Workers' Party candidate Luiz Inácio Lula da Silva was arrested in April 2018, Bolsonaro became the frontrunner according to all major opinion polls. A Datafolha poll from September showed Bolsonaro as the leading candidate in the first round with 28% of vote intentions, though runoff scenarios showed him losing to Geraldo Alckmin, Fernando Haddad, and Ciro Gomes and tying with Marina Silva. Another Datafolha poll, conducted the week before election day, showed a considerable surge for Bolsonaro, who had 40% of vote intentions, or 36% when null or blank vote intentions were included. Haddad came in second with 25% and Gomes third with 15%.

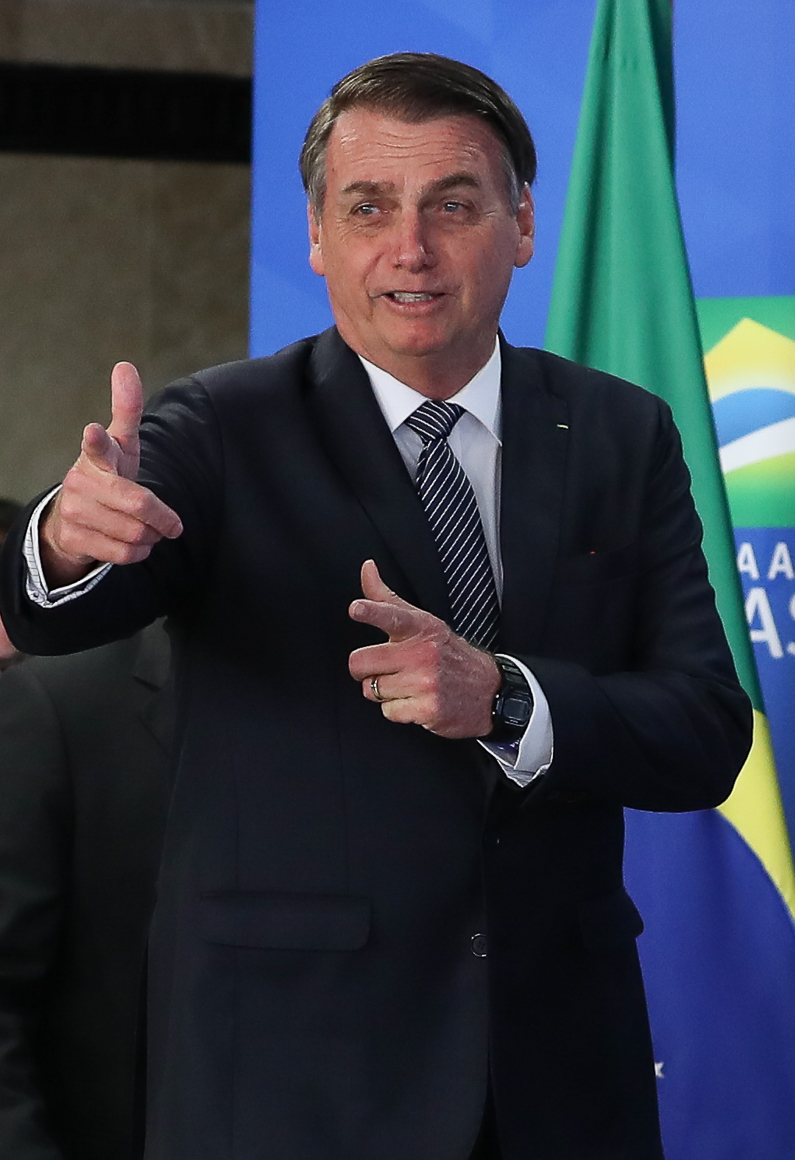
Bolsonaro is known for his finger-gun gesture, which he used during the presidential campaign.

In the first round of the election, on 7 October 2018, Bolsonaro finished in first place with 46% of the popular vote (49.2 million). Since he failed to win over 50%, he faced the second-place finisher, Haddad, in the second round, held on 28 October 2018. After the first round, when his victory looked certain, Bolsonaro gave a speech by videolink to thousands of supporters who gathered at Paulista Avenue, in São Paulo. In the speech he threatened to arrest, purge, or kill "reds" and "petralhas" (a derogatory term for Workers' Party members), and promised that members of the social movements MST and MTST would be treated as "terrorists".

He said: "This time, the clean-up will be even greater. This group ["reds"], if they want to stay, will have to abide by our laws ... These red outlaws will be banned from our homeland. Either they go overseas, or they go to jail ... Petralhada, you all go to the edge of the beach. It will be a cleaning never seen in the history of Brazil". The "edge of the beach", a Bolsonaro aide later confirmed, was a reference to a Navy base at Restinga da Marambaia, in Rio de Janeiro State, where the Brazilian military dictatorship tortured and killed dissidents. The speech was widely condemned by rivals, journalists and politicians.

Bolsonaro won the second round of the election with 55.13% of the votes, and was elected the 38th president of Brazil. He took office on 1 January 2019. During the campaign, academics repeatedly raised concerns about the consequences to Brazilian democracy Bolsonaro's rise will have. In the news magazine Foreign Policy, Federico Finchelstein, a historian at the New School for Social Research who specializes in fascism, wrote, "Bolsonaro's vocabulary recalls the rhetoric behind Nazi policies of persecution and victimization. But does sounding like a Nazi make him a Nazi? Insomuch as he believes in holding elections, he is not there yet. However, things could change quickly if he gains power".

Jason Stanley, a philosopher at Yale University who has published widely on Nazism, said that Bolsonaro "uses more tactics associated to fascism than [the] American president Donald Trump". Steven Levitsky, a political scientist at Harvard University, said that Bolsonaro "is clearly authoritarian", but not a fascist. Similar concerns were raised by analysts in Portugal and Brazil. Others, such as the Marxist historian Perry Anderson, dismissed the "fascist" and "populist" labels altogether.

Another aspect of the campaign was the alleged use of illegal digital communication strategies by some of Bolsonaro's most important financial supporters. According to an investigation by Folha, one of Brazil's bestselling newspapers, "Bolsonaro has been getting an illegal helping hand from a group of Brazilian entrepreneurs who are bankrolling a campaign to bombard WhatsApp users with fake news about Haddad". The suspicions led to a formal investigation by electoral authorities and the Federal Police; Bolsonaro and allies denied any wrongdoing. Another controversial point was that Taíse Feijó, an adviser in Bolsonaro's government, was among those paid to feed fake news to his supporters.

=== Attempted assassination ===
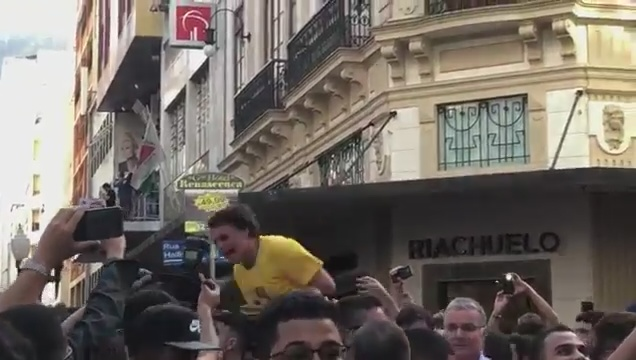
The moment Bolsonaro (center, yellow shirt) was attacked at the Juiz de Fora rally

Bolsonaro was stabbed in the abdomen on 6 September 2018 while campaigning and interacting with supporters in Juiz de Fora, Minas Gerais. At first, his son Flávio Bolsonaro stated that his father's wounds were only superficial and he was recovering in the hospital, but he later said the wounds seemed worse than initially thought and his father most likely would not be able to start campaigning personally before the end of the first round. He posted on Twitter about his father's condition, explaining that the perforation had reached parts of the liver, lung, and intestine. He also said that Bolsonaro had lost a large amount of blood, arriving at the hospital with severe hypotension (his blood pressure was 10/3, equivalent to 100/30 mmHg), but that he had since stabilized.

The attack was condemned by most of the other candidates in the presidential race, and by President Michel Temer. The day after the attack, Bolsonaro was transferred to the Albert Einstein Israelite Hospital in São Paulo, after a request from his family. According to the doctors, he was in an "extremely stable" condition.

Police arrested the attacker and identified him as Adélio Bispo de Oliveira, who, according to security agents, claimed he was on "a mission from God". He had been a member of the Socialism and Liberty Party from 2007 to 2014. His social media posts included political criticisms of both Bolsonaro and Temer. But an initial Federal Police investigation concluded that Adélio had no help from political organizations and acted alone. A medical report produced for a second investigation concluded that Bispo is mentally disturbed, having a "permanent paranoid delusional disorder" which, according to Brazilian law, prevents him from being considered legally liable for his actions. In a May 2019 decision the Federal Court found Bispo not liable. Bolsonaro did not appeal the decision.

On 29 September, a month after the attack, Bolsonaro was released from the hospital and returned to his home in Rio de Janeiro. His condition prevented him from returning to the campaign trail for the remainder of the first round of the presidential election. The first federal police investigation into the attack concluded that the attacker acted alone, but the investigation "leaves out many issues". Bolsonaro said he did not observe "any effort by [the] former minister Sergio Moro to resolve the matter". Joaquim de Carvalho has said that the police left out of their investigation the search for information by a mastermind of the attack or even a self-attack. For this, expert medical examination of Bolsonaro and review of the medical records would be needed.

=== Personal motto ===
Bolsonaro's personal motto, which he established in 2016, is John 8:32: "The truth will set you free".

=== Protests ===
The same weekend he left the hospital, thousands of people took to the streets in dozens of cities in Brazil to protest against Bolsonaro and his political stances, chanting "Ele não" ("Not him"). There were also rallies in support of the candidate in sixteen states.

== Presidency (2019–2023) ==
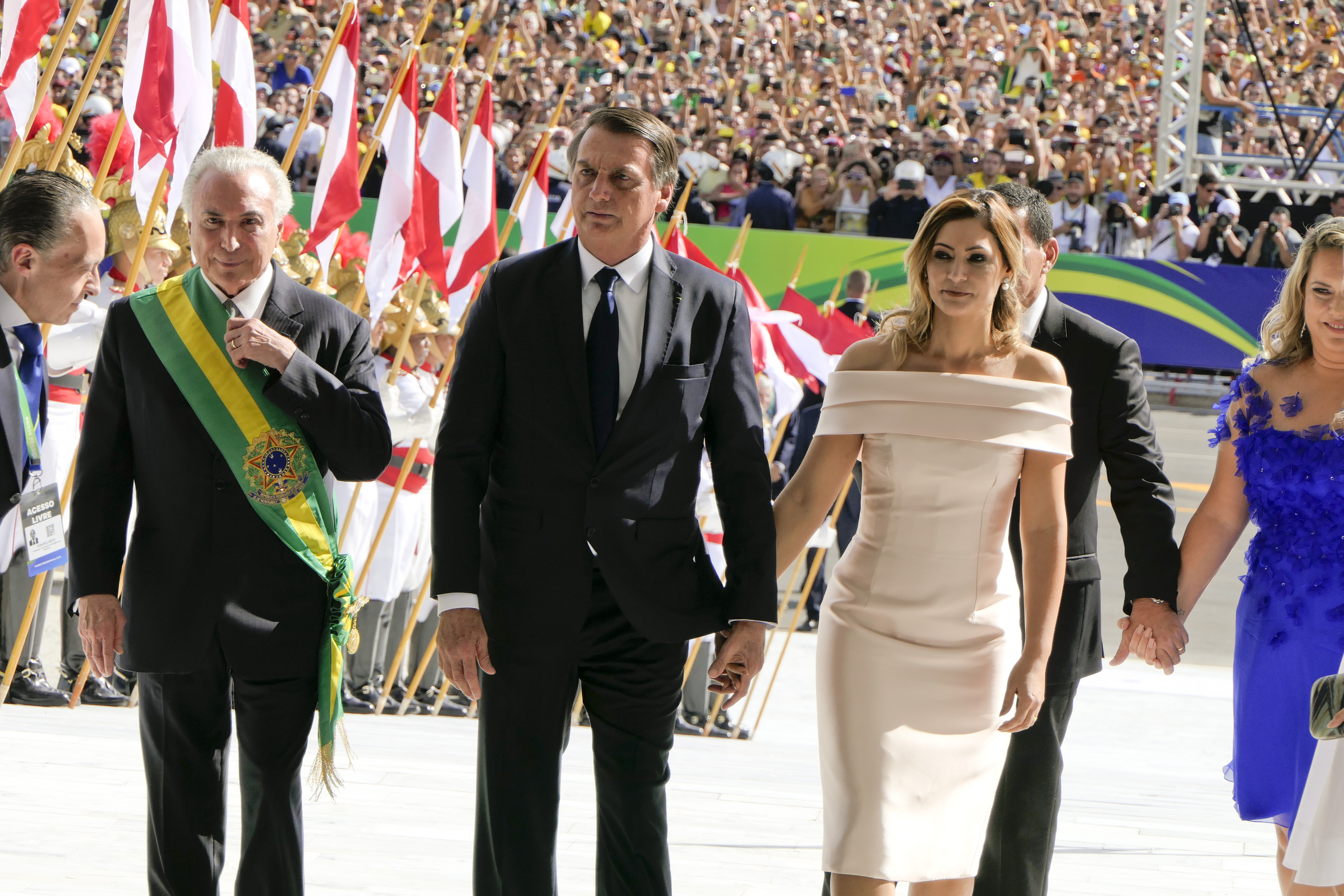
Michel Temer with Bolsonaro and his wife Michelle during the inauguration on 1 January 2019

Bolsonaro was sworn in as president on 1 January 2019, succeeding Michel Temer. Bolsonaro began to get his cabinet together before his inauguration, choosing the economist Paulo Guedes as his economy minister and the astronaut Marcos Pontes as his science and technology minister. Bolsonaro said his cabinet would have 15 members; in December when he announced Ricardo Salles as a minister, the total was 22. (His predecessor, Michel Temer, had a 29-member cabinet.)

Bolsonaro's initial cabinet was composed of 16 ministers, two cabinet-level positions, and four presidential secretaries, including Chief of Staff Onyx Lorenzoni. Bolsonaro's ministers included Operation Car Wash judge Sergio Moro as Justice Minister and congresswoman Tereza Cristina as Minister of Agriculture. Bolsonaro placed many army officers in key positions in his cabinet. Before his inauguration, he said he would fill positions in his government based only on technical qualifications and skills rather than ideological sympathy; however, many appointees clashed ideologically with the government during his presidency and fell out of favor with Bolsonaro. By June 2020 the ministers of Justice and Education, the Secretary of Government, the head of the postal service and other government officials had already resigned.

Early in his administration, Bolsonaro focused primarily on domestic and economic issues, ranging from tax reform to changes in social security, but he faced an uphill battle with Congress. Bolsonaro stripped the indigenous affairs agency FUNAI of the responsibility to identify and demarcate indigenous lands, arguing that those territories have tiny, isolated populations who would be controlled by NPOs, and proposed to integrate them into the larger Brazilian society. Critics feared that such integration would force Brazilian Amerindians to suffer cultural assimilation. Argentine President Mauricio Macri was the first foreign leader Bolsonaro received on a state visit to Brasília after he became president.

The second inauguration of Nicolás Maduro in Venezuela took place nine days after Bolsonaro's inauguration. The disputed results of the 2018 Venezuelan presidential election led to the Venezuelan presidential crisis, as the National Assembly rejected the results, considered Maduro an illegitimate ruler since his first term of office ended, and appointed Juan Guaidó as acting president. Bolsonaro did not attend Maduro's inauguration and recognized Guaidó as the legitimate ruler of Venezuela, alongside Mauricio Macri from Argentina and Donald Trump from the US, among others. He said that "We will continue doing everything possible to re-establish order, democracy and freedom there".

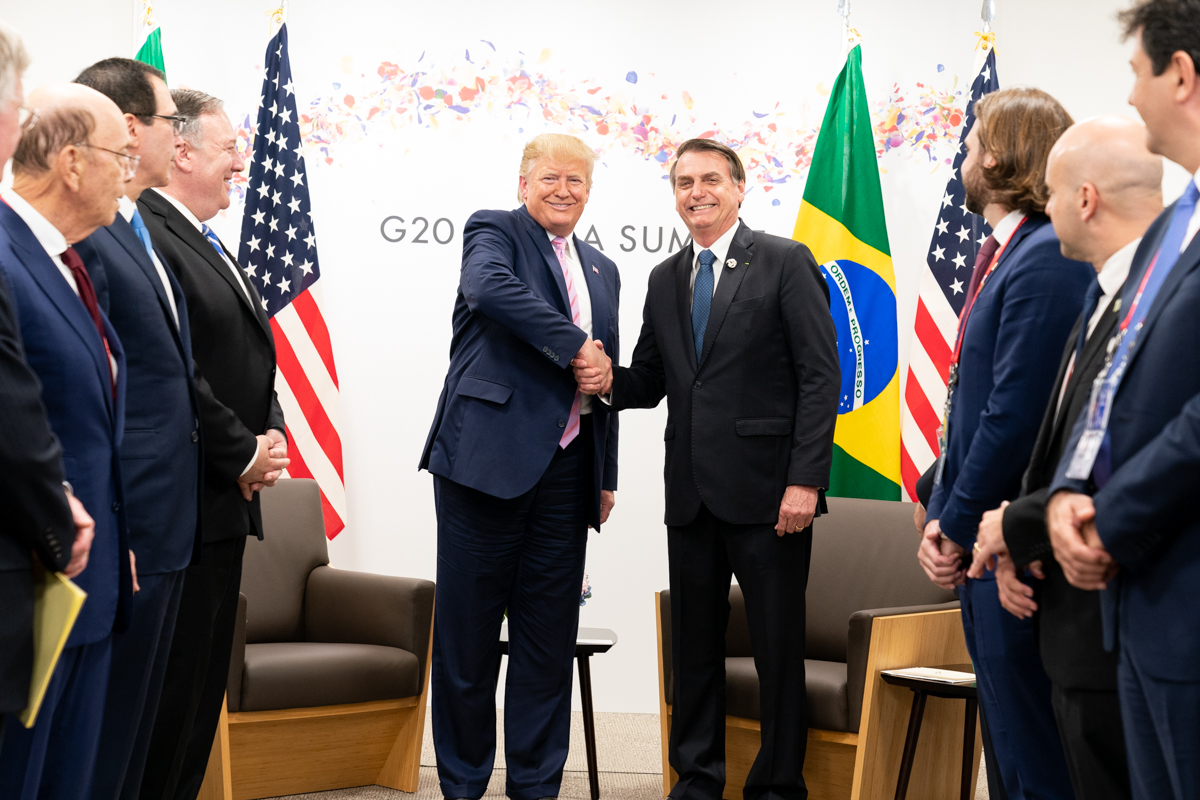
Bolsonaro and Trump at the G20 meeting in 2019

After his first year in power, Bolsonaro's popularity steadily declined. A Datafolha survey, published on 21 May 2019, showed that 28.6% of respondents described Bolsonaro's administration as "excellent" or "good", 31.3% as "average", and 36.2% as "bad" or "terrible"; 3.9% did not respond. This was the first poll in which more Brazilians disapproved of Bolsonaro's government than approved of it. Meanwhile, after allegations of campaign-finance fraud, Bolsonaro fired Gustavo Bebianno, a top adviser and general secretary for the president. The party that they both belonged to was accused of diverting public campaign funds to candidates who did not run for office.

In November 2019, Bolsonaro left the Social Liberal Party due to conflicts with its leadership. He attempted to form his own party, Alliance for Brazil (Portuguese: Aliança pelo Brasil), but it failed to gather enough signatures to register at the Superior Electoral Court for the 2020 municipal elections or the 2022 general election, leaving Bolsonaro without a party until 2021.

Throughout the COVID-19 pandemic in Brazil, Bolsonaro and his administration were accused of downplaying the crisis while the number of Brazilians infected by the virus climbed exponentially by mid-2020. Bolsonaro claimed that COVID-19 was no deadlier than "the flu" and that his priority was the nation's economic recovery rather than the health crisis. In fact, as at early 2021, the Brazilian economy was bouncing back, albeit somewhat slowly and inconsistently, as the pandemic was still threatening to undo any economic recovery. Bolsonaro continually accused political opponents and the press of exaggerating the threat of the virus and called it a "fantasy" created by the media.

In August 2020, in the middle of the pandemic, Bolsonaro's approval rating showed signs of recovery, reaching its highest level since his inauguration. In November 2020 he said he would not take a COVID vaccine if it became available, but he later said he would support any possible vaccine if the Brazilian Health Agency deemed it safe. In the same broadcast, he called face masks "the last taboo to fall". In 2020 the Organized Crime and Corruption Reporting Project (OCCRP), an international non-governmental organization that investigates crime and corruption, gave Bolsonaro its Person of the Year Award, which "recognizes the individual who has done the most in the world to advance organized criminal activity and corruption". Bolsonaro received the award for "surrounding himself with corrupt figures, using propaganda to promote his populist agenda, undermining the justice system, and waging a destructive war against the Amazon region that has enriched some of the country's worst land owners".

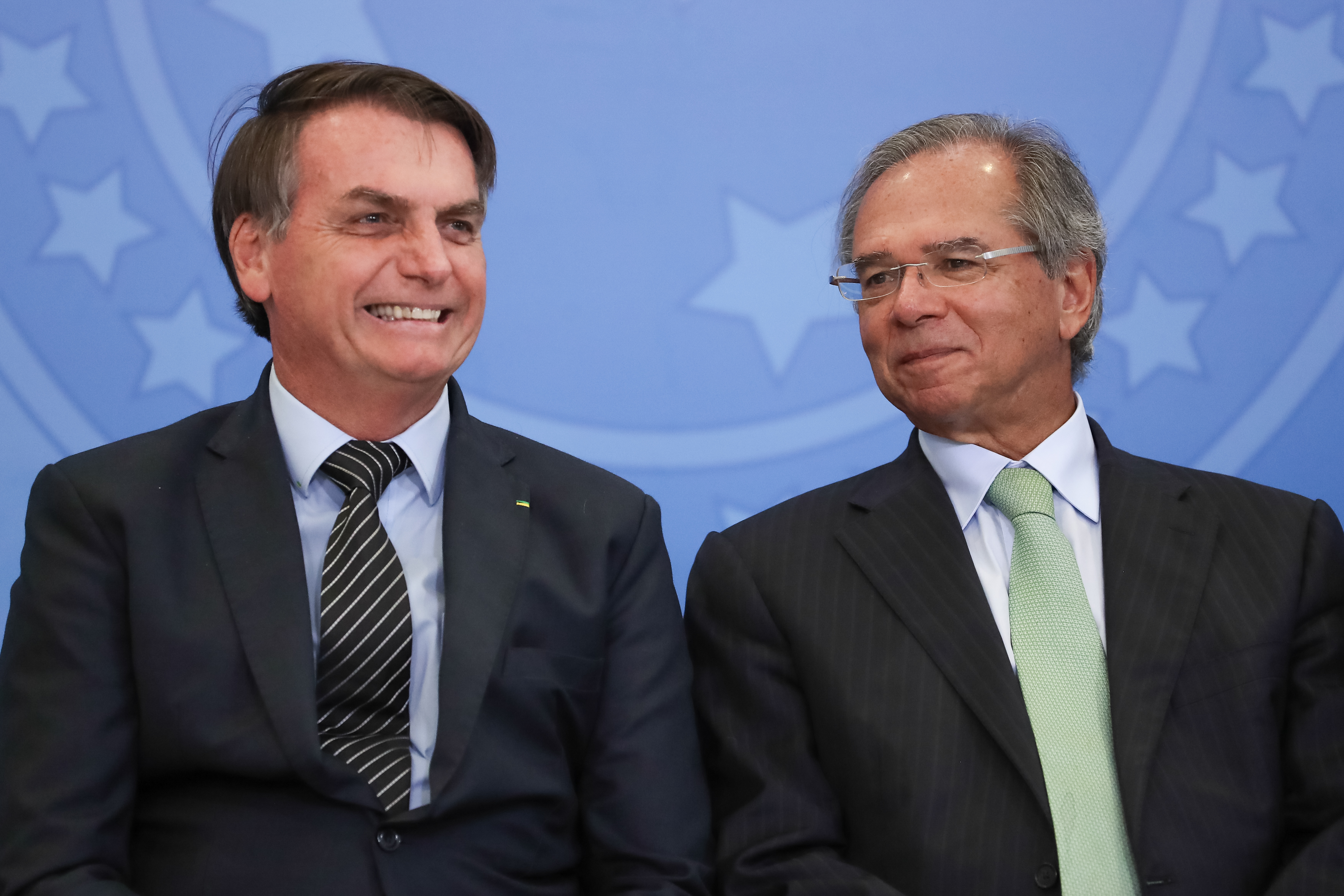
Jair Bolsonaro and economist Paulo Guedes in Brasília, 2020

In early 2021 Bolsonaro's approval ratings fell again, mostly due to the government's response to the COVID-19 pandemic, vaccination controversies, and the concurrent economic crisis that evolved under his watch. Days after Brazil surpassed Russia as the country worst hit by COVID, Bolsonaro held a political rally in Brasília; his supporters and his own security guards wore masks, but he did not. In June 2021, nationwide protests erupted against Bolsonaro's response to the pandemic; in São Paulo alone there were estimated to be 100,000 protesters on the streets. In July, YouTube removed videos posted by Bolsonaro for spreading false information about the virus. YouTube has reportedly removed 15 videos altogether; one that was removed had shown Brazil's former health minister, Eduardo Pazuello, comparing the virus to HIV. In other videos, Bolsonaro criticized efforts to stop the spread of the virus, such as wearing masks or taking the vaccine.

By the end of June 2021, more members of the opposition started to call for his impeachment over his handling of the pandemic and spreading misinformation. The opposition signed a document with multiple accusations, such as blaming Bolsonaro for the deaths of 500,000 Brazilians from COVID-19, stating that his government had blatantly turned down expert advice on tackling the virus, and at least 20 other grievances. In July 2021, Bolsonaro claimed on Brazilian radio that his government's greatest achievement was "two and a half years without corruption".

Also in July, a scandal dubbed "vaccine-gate" emerged. After months of denying offers of vaccines and bartering the costs, Bolsonaro's government made a deal to buy the unapproved Covaxin vaccine from the Indian company Bharat Biotech at a very high price. It was found that the government paid ten times the amount agreed by Bharat Biotech for the vaccine, and that the irregularities were found not in the price of the vaccine, but in a payment of $45 million to a company in Singapore. In response, the Supreme Court authorized a criminal investigation of Bolsonaro.

In March 2021 Bolsonaro dismissed Fernando Azevedo e Silva as defense minister and replaced him with Walter Souza Braga Netto; like Bolsonaro, Netto lionized the 1964–1985 military dictatorship. The day after Netto was appointed, the leaders of the army, air force, and navy all resigned. In April, Bolsonaro claimed that the Brazilian armed forces would "go into the streets" if he ordered them to. In mid-August, the military conducted a ten-minute tank parade in Brasília, with Bolsonaro in attendance. The parade had been held annually in the last 30 years, but tanks had never been sent to the capital before. The parade was announced only a day in advance, and passed by the national congressional building, where lawmakers were due to vote on Bolsonaro's proposed election-related changes hours later. The lawmakers ultimately rejected the changes.

On 28 July 2021 Bolsonaro appointed Ciro Noguiera, a senator who was implicated in the Odebrecht corruption case, as his chief of staff. In early August 2021, Bolsonaro threatened to respond with unconstitutional measures to an investigation over his baseless allegations of fraud vulnerabilities in Brazil's electronic voting system, because he deemed that investigation unconstitutional. Supreme Court Justice Alexandre de Moraes had approved the investigation. In mid-August 2021 Bolsonaro warned of a potential "institutional rupture", while urging the Senate to charge de Moraes and another Supreme Court Judge, Luis Roberto Barroso, the leader of the electoral court. On 26 October 2021 a Senate committee approved a report calling for Bolsonaro to face criminal charges, including crimes against humanity, for his handling of the COVID-19 pandemic.

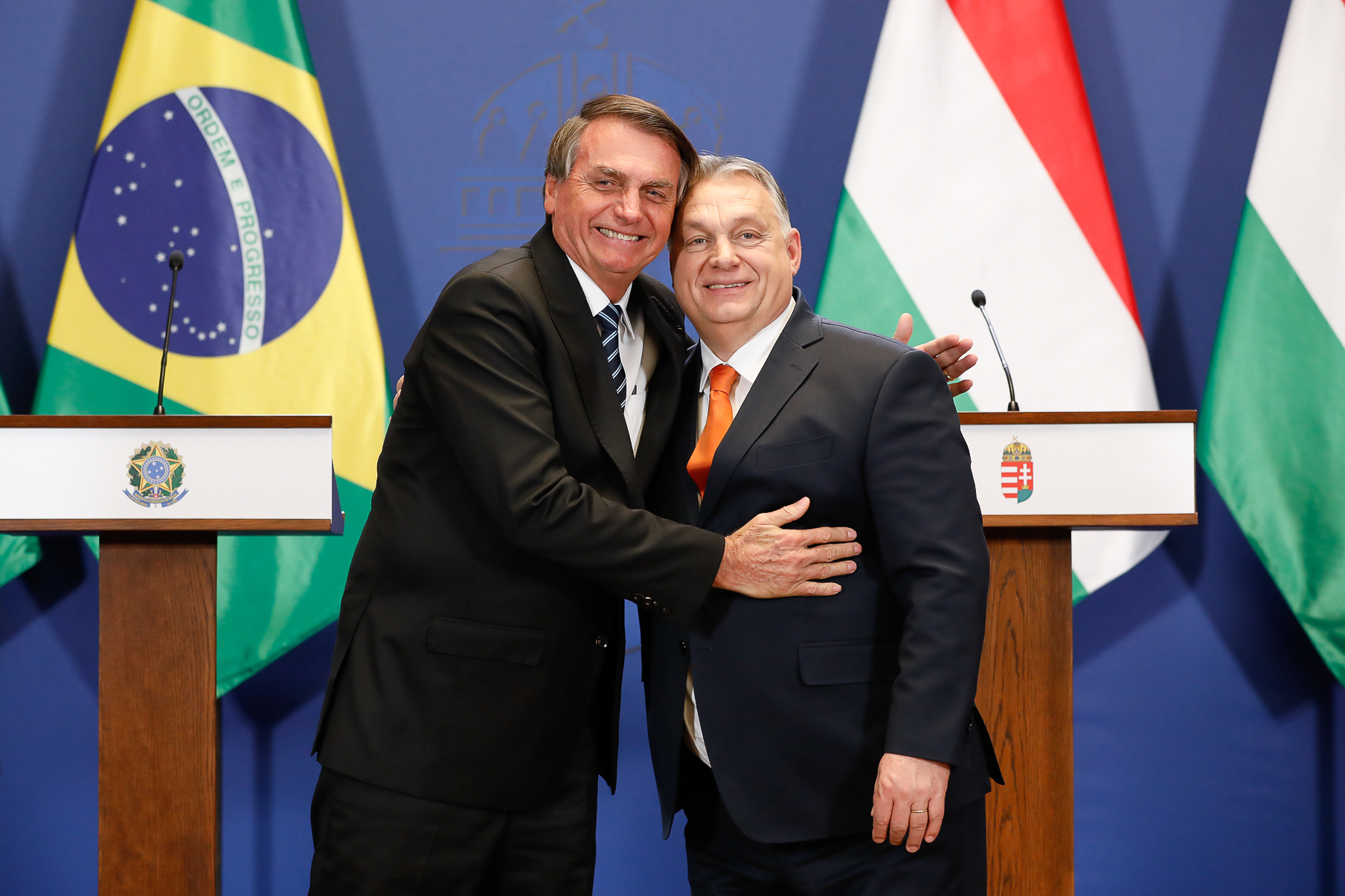
Bolsonaro and Orbán in Budapest, Hungary, in 2022

Without a political party, Bolsonaro began to negotiate his entrance into one in preparation for the 2022 general election (as the 1988 Brazilian Constitution does not allow independent politicians). He negotiated with the Progressistas (PP), of which he was a member from 1995 to 2003 and from 2005 to 2016, and the Social Christian Party (PSC), of which he was a member from 2016 to 2018, the Brazilian Labour Party (PTB), Brazilian Woman's Party (PMB), Christian Democracy (DC), Party of National Mobilization (PMN), the Republicans and Patriot (PATRI).

On 30 November 2021 Bolsonaro and his son Senator Flávio Bolsonaro joined the Liberal Party (PL). According to political analysts, the choice represented the consolidation of the alliance of Bolsonaro with the Centrão, a large bloc of parties without consistent ideological orientation that supports different sides of the political spectrum to gain political privileges—PL being one of them. Bolsonaro previously made deals with the Centrão for support in Congress. On 23 June 2022 Bolsonaro defended his former education minister, Milton Ribeiro, after the latter was arrested on corruption charges.

=== 2022 presidential election ===
In the second round of the presidential election on 30 October, Bolsonaro was defeated by former president Luiz Inácio Lula da Silva, who took 50.9% of the votes cast. Lula had won the most votes in the first round of the election on 2 October, receiving 48.43% of the votes cast; Bolsonaro received 43.20%. In a press conference at the Palácio da Alvorada on 1 November, Bolsonaro did not acknowledge his defeat but stated that he would "comply with the Constitution". Regarding the protests by his supporters, he referred to them as "the fruit of indignation and a sense of injustice of how the electoral process unfolded", while calling on them to remain peaceful and not block roads. Shortly after his speech, the Supreme Court stated that by authorizing the transition of power he had recognized the results, paving the way for the transition two days after Lula was recognized as the winner. Bolsonaro left for the United States on 30 December to avoid taking part in the swearing-in ceremony of Lula, leaving Vice President Hamilton Mourão as the acting president.

The documentary Apocalypse in the Tropics (2024) shows how evangelical pastor Silas Malafaia had a defining influence on Bolsonaro, while mustering support from Brazil's evangelical movement, in the path to Bolsonaro losing the election and in the protests and attempted insurrection that followed.

== Post-presidency (2023–present) ==
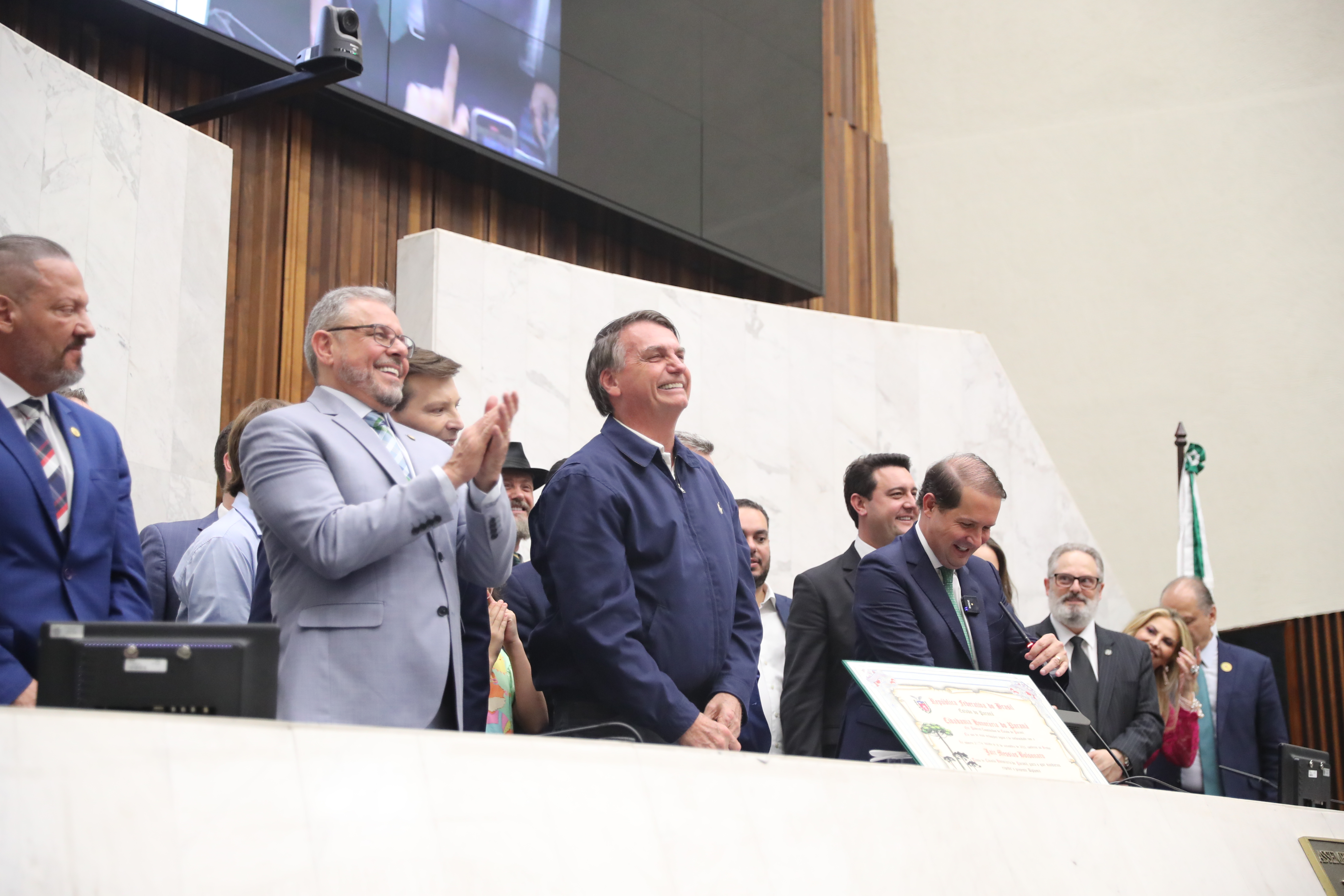
Bolsonaro in 2023 visiting the state of Paraná

On 30 December 2022, one day before the end of his term, Bolsonaro arrived in the US state of Florida and resided in Kissimmee for several months. On 8 January 2023, his supporters attacked the buildings of the Supreme Court of Brazil, the National Congress, and the Planalto Presidential Palace to instigate a military coup d'état and reinstate Bolsonaro as president. While the riots were going on, President Lula blamed Bolsonaro in a press conference. Bolsonaro condemned the protesters in a Twitter post on 9 January, and denied responsibility.

In February 2023, Bolsonaro announced that he would return to Brazil in March. This would be the first time Bolsonaro had returned since December 2022. Bolsonaro had entered the United States on a diplomatic visa, which expired on 31 January, but the family applied for tourist visas to extend their stay in Florida.

Bolsonaro returned to Brazil in March 2023 for the first time since his supporters stormed the Supreme Court, Congress, and the presidential palace two months before. Bolsonaro stated that he returned to the country to help his party and intended to campaign for the 2024 elections. On 14 April 2023, Supreme Court judge Alexandre de Moraes ordered Bolsonaro to submit himself for questioning with the Federal Police over the storming of the Congress.

In July 2024, the Federal Police charged Bolsonaro with money laundering and criminal conspiracy related to undeclared diamonds he allegedly received from Saudi Arabia while in office.

=== Ineligibility, charges of coup planning, conviction, and return to federal custody ===
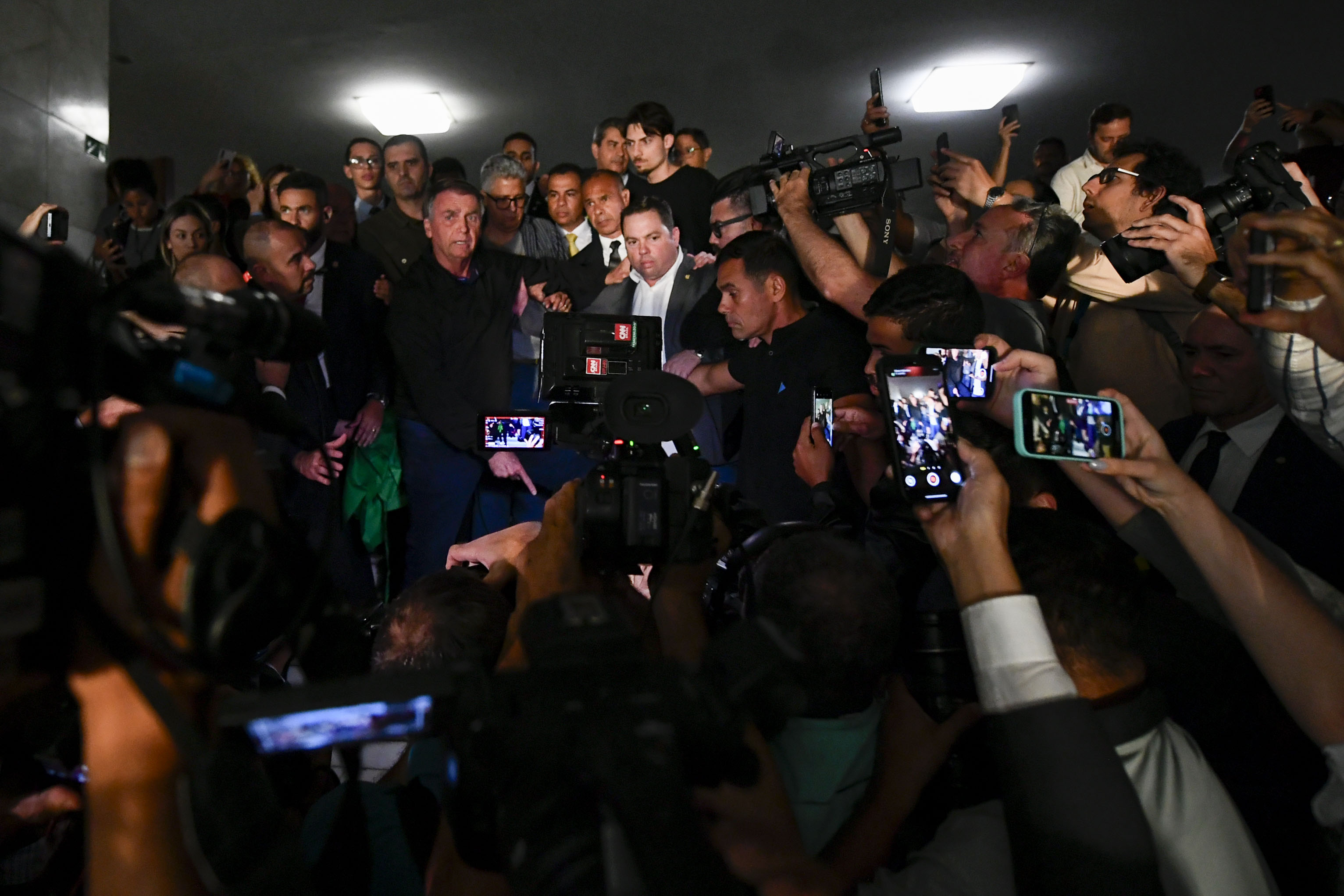
Bolsonaro showing his electronic ankle monitor at the National Congress. After the incident, Alexandre de Moraes requested an explanation from him, as he was prohibited from giving interviews—otherwise, he would be immediately arrested, but Moraes ultimately deemed it just an "isolated irregularity".

On 30 June 2023, the Superior Electoral Court barred Bolsonaro from running for public office until 2030 as a result of his attempts to undermine the validity of Brazil's 2022 democratic election, as well as for abuse of power with regard to using government channels to promote his campaign. The decision applies to municipal, state and federal elections for the next eight years. He was prosecuted on several fraud charges in the 2022 elections and events linked to the 8 January attack on federal government buildings. The decision came after a 5–2 vote in favour of conviction. Following the decision, Bolsonaro stated his intentions to appeal.

On 31 October 2023, Bolsonaro was again convicted by the Superior Electoral Court over abuse of power for using Brazil's Independence Day ceremony to promote himself as a candidate which is banned under the Brazilian law. Former defence minister Walter Braga Netto, who attended the ceremony, and also ran for vice president on Bolsonaro's ticket, was convicted by the Court and ruled disqualified to run for any office for the next eight years.

In February 2024, the Federal Police raided former government officials and ordered Bolsonaro to hand in his passport over accusations that he and his allies tried to overturn the results of the 2022 election and planned a coup d'état. In March 2024, witness documents released by the Superior Electoral Court were made public. According to two military officials, Bolsonaro had plotted to overturn the 2022 results and presented top military officials a plan to carry out a coup with the goal of keeping him in power.

In his testimony the former Brazilian Army commander Marco Antônio Freire Gomes said that he had warned Bolsonaro the army would not tolerate "any act of institutional rupture", and added that Bolsonaro's actions could result in his arrest. The former Brazilian Air Force commander Carlos de Almeida Baptista Júnior testified that he tried to dissuade Bolsonaro of "any extreme measure" and expressed his belief that Freire Gomes was instrumental in avoiding the use of a legal document that Bolsonaro presented in several meetings in December 2022 to overturn the results of the election. Baptista Júnior further said that the then Brazilian Navy commander Almir Garnier Santos told Bolsonaro he would put his troops at his disposal, and commented: "If the commander [Freire Gomes] had agreed, possibly, a coup d'état attempt would have taken place."

In late March 2024 The New York Times released footage from internal security cameras in the Hungarian embassy in Brasília showing Bolsonaro and his aides and bodyguards entering the building on 12 February and leaving the place on 14 February. This happened after his Brazilian and Italian passports were confiscated, and Bolsonaro was prohibited from leaving the country due to an investigation about an alleged plot to carry out a military coup. Bolsonaro was welcomed by Hungarian ambassador to Brazil Miklós Halmai who reportedly sent the embassy's local employees a message to work from home during those dates.

Following the report, the Supreme Court gave Bolsonaro a 48-hour deadline to explain his stay in the embassy, and the Federal Police announced it was opening an investigation into the incident; which could have been viewed as an attempt to escape justice via diplomatic asylum, since embassies are typically considered inviolable and host countries cannot enforce their law inside them without permission. Media commentators and people on social media speculated this hypothesis was likely to be true citing Bolsonaro and Hungarian prime minister Viktor Orbán are both right-wing populist politicians who share a personal friendship, and Hungary's previous granting of asylum to the sanctioned former Macedonian prime minister Nikola Gruevski. Additionally, the Ministry of Foreign Affairs summoned Halmai to give explanations about Bolsonaro's two-night stay in the embassy.

On 19 March 2024 the Federal Police formally accused Bolsonaro of fraud on his COVID-19 vaccine records. In November 2024 he and 36 others were formally charged with plotting a coup d'état, violent abolition of the democratic rule of law, and criminal organisation. In February 2025 Bolsonaro and 33 others were formally charged with plotting to assassinate Lula da Silva and Supreme Court Justice Alexandre de Moraes. On 26 March the Supreme Federal Court ordered Bolsonaro and seven of his associates to stand trial over the charges.

On 21 November 2024 the Federal Police indicted Bolsonaro and 36 other people related to Bolsonaro's defeat in the 2022 presidential elections. He is alleged to have known of a plot to assassinate his successor, Luiz Inácio Lula da Silva, and to overturn the election result.

The trial against Bolsonaro and 80 other officials began in Brasília on 19 May 2025.

On 9 July 2025 US president Donald Trump criticized the criminal prosecution of Bolsonaro, accused Brazil of being an unfair trading partner, and claimed the 50% tariff imposition was still less than what the US needed for a "level playing field"—despite the US trade surplus with Brazil. This led to comparisons about federal prosecution of Donald Trump involving the scandal with Stormy Daniels and Lula's arrest, and Trump's eligibility after the 6 January United States Capitol attack versus Bolsonaro's ineligibility after the 8 January Brasília attacks. Bolsonaro could request US political asylum—especially given that Trump labelled Brazil's charges a "witch hunt"—but would need safe‑conduct to leave Brazil and must prove credible political persecution. US authorities would then decide whether to grant asylum; diplomatic tensions and travel restrictions would make the outcome uncertain.

On 18 July 2025 police again searched his home and ordered him to wear an electronic ankle tag. On 26 August he was placed under 24-hour surveillance after being designated as a "flight-risk".

On 11 September 2025, the Supreme Federal Court sentenced Bolsonaro to 27 years and 3 months in prison over the coup plot.

On 22 November 2025, Bolsonaro was arrested, transferred to the headquarters of the Federal Police of Brazil in Brasilia and ordered by Supreme Court Justice Alexandre de Moraes to be transferred back to prison after he attempted to remove the electronic ankle tag and escape house arrest. Bolsonaro blamed his actions on a nervous breakdown and hallucinations caused by a change in his medication. On November 24 the Supreme Federal Court unanimously voted to keep Bolsonaro in police custody. On November 25 the Supreme Court rejected his final appeals, declared the case to have reached res judicata and ordered the beginning of the enforcement of the prison sentence. On December 19, he was allowed temporary release to undergo a hernia operation.

On 1 January 2026, Supreme Federal Court rejected Bolsonaro's request to convert his prison sentence to house arrest. Bolsonaro's lawyers submitted the request on 31 December 2025 quoting "real risk of a sudden worsening" regarding his health as the reason why the sentence should be converted. Judge de Moraes said "there has been no worsening" of Bolsonaro's health. On 15 January 2026, Justice Alexandre de Moraes ordered the transfer of Bolsonaro to the Federal District's 19th Military Police Battalion at the Papuda Penitentiary Complex. Moraes determined that Bolsonaro be held in a “state quarters” room, with better conditions suited to his health condition.

On 13 March 2026, Bolsonaro was hospitalized and admitted to the ICU after feeling unwell during the night. He experienced dizziness, high fever, a drop in oxygen saturation, and chills. He was diagnosed with bacterial bronchopneumonia. On 24 March 2026, Justice Alexandre de Moraes granted Bolsonaro temporary humanitarian house arrest. The house arrest was set to last for 90 days from his discharge from the hospital. Moraes also ordered that Bolsonaro must wear an electronic ankle monitor, may not receive visitors except for family members and lawyers, and may not have any contact with mobile phones or social media. On 3 July 2026, Moraes ordered the extension of Bolsonaro's humanitarian house arrest.

== Political positions ==
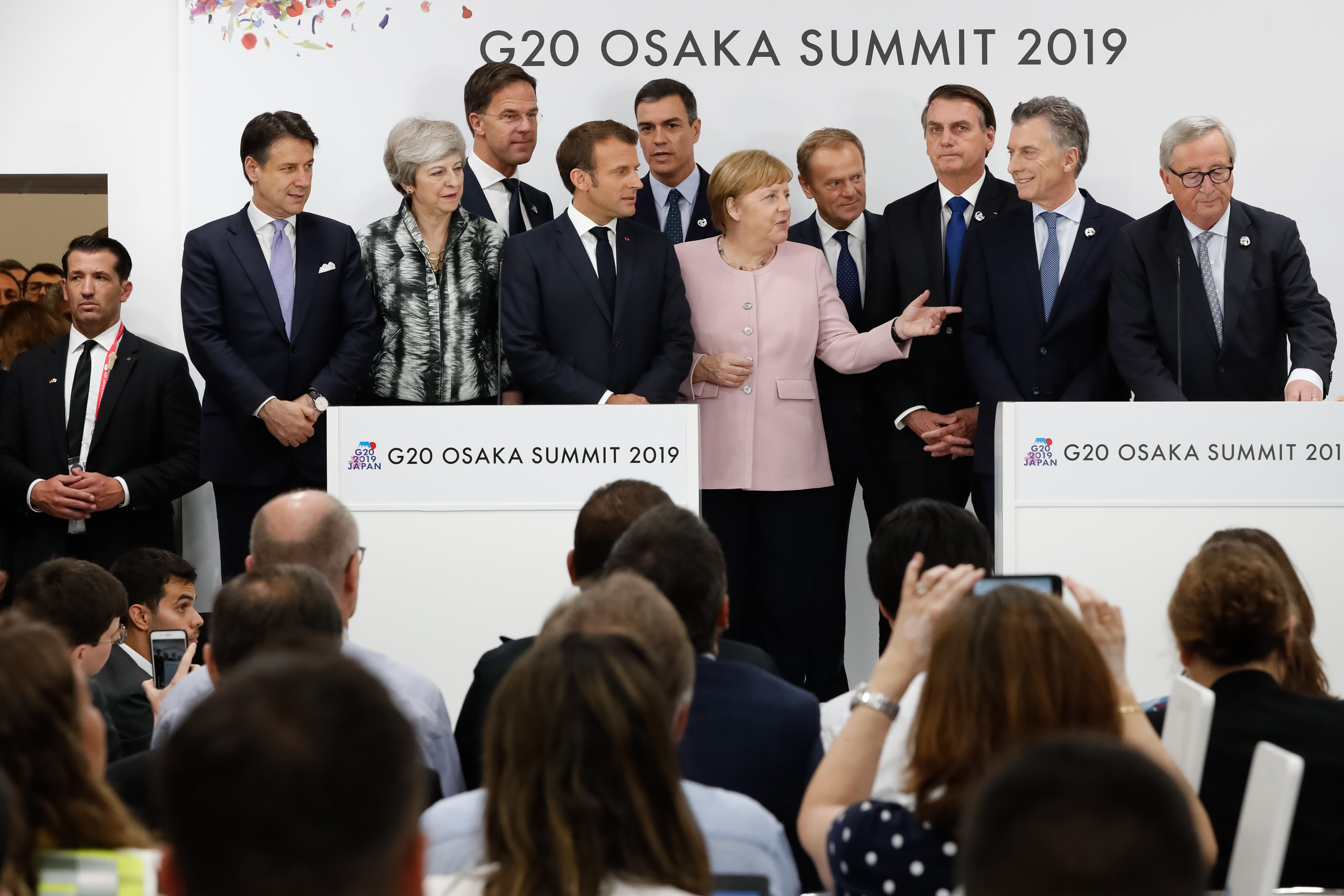
Bolsonaro supported the European Union–Mercosur Free Trade Agreement, which would form one of the world's largest free trade areas.

Bolsonaro's political views have been described as Brazilian nationalist and right-wing populist in nature, and he himself as an advocate of far-right politics. His supporters say that his views are more aligned with traditional right-wing conservatism. His electorate is mainly formed by adults above the age of 34, the working middle to upper class, mainly in the southeast region of Brazil, conservatives in general, college graduates, some centrists and the Christian right. According to some polls, Bolsonaro's main support comes from the southeast, central-west, and south regions of Brazil. His voters are usually male and white, with a noticeable gender gap, with Bolsonaro polling poorly among female voters, mustering only 18% support with women. Just before the 2018 election, however, it was reported that female support for him had risen to 27%.

Bolsonaro is viewed as an anti-abortion, anti-establishment, and pro-gun politician, voicing opposition to most forms of gun laws in Brazil, arguing that law-abiding citizens have the right to self-defence, especially those living in rural areas. According to The Washington Post, "Homicides hit a record high of 63,880 last year ... Bolsonaro's solution is zero tolerance. He has called for police to use more lethal force and wants to relax gun laws so that average citizens can defend themselves." Bolsonaro often rejects accusations made against him of misogyny and homophobia, and says he is not far-right but simply right-wing.

Bolsonaro is known for his strong opposition to left-wing politics. Most notably, he has been a vocal opponent of same-sex marriage, environmental regulations, abortion, affirmative action (particularly racial quotas), as well as immigration, particularly from Haiti, Africa and the Middle East, which he once called "the scum of humanity". He has also opposed drug liberalization, land reforms, among other things. He made statements in defence of the Brazilian military dictatorship, (US-backed dictatorship known for human-rights violations). He argues that torture is a "legitimate practice" and says that he would try to pass new legislation regarding the introduction of life imprisonment to the Brazilian penal code. Bolsonaro supports the privatization of state-owned companies and advocates free-market policies, although critics have stated that his policy-making record does not in fact show him to be a supporter of economic liberalism.

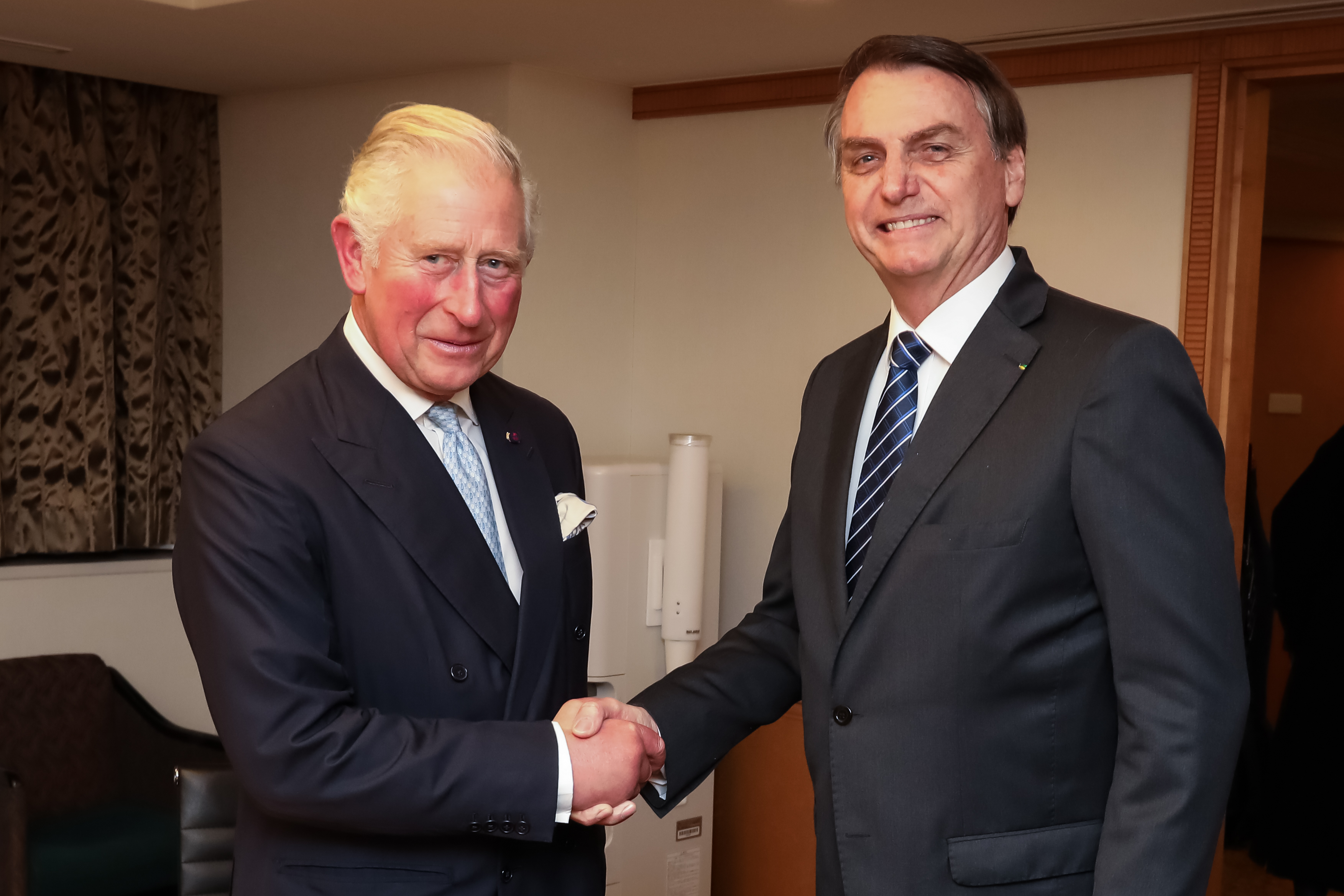
Bolsonaro and Charles, then Prince of Wales, in October 2019

In a 2017 interview with the journalist Claudio Dantas Sequeira from O Antagonista, Bolsonaro said that his views are directly aligned with the centrist to right-wing United States citizens' views on gun ownership, abortion, gender politics, and trade, despite the "left-leaning media frenzy" against him. He reiterated that he intends to reverse some disarmament laws, improve public security, and also improve trade ties with the United States, which he said were broken during Luiz Inácio Lula da Silva's and Dilma Rousseff's administrations.

During his long political career, Bolsonaro expressed views regarded as being far-right. He has made statements that some people considered insulting, homophobic, violence-inciting, misogynistic, sexist, racist, or anti-refugee. Other controversial political stances expressed by Bolsonaro have been the defence of the death penalty, which is banned under the Constitution of Brazil of 1988, and of radical interventionism in Brazil by the military, along with an imposition of a Brazilian military government.

The journalist Glenn Greenwald called Bolsonaro "the most misogynistic, hateful elected official in the democratic world". News.com.au wondered whether Bolsonaro was "the world's most repulsive politician". The news magazine The Economist referred to him as a "radical", "religious nationalist", a "right-wing demagogue", and "apologist of dictators". Federico Finchelstein, a scholar on fascism and populism, has considered Bolsonaro, as he would link violence to austerity and neoliberal economic ideas, to be the most similar leader to Augusto Pinochet to come out from the young South American democracies. Leonardo Fontes, a postdoctoral researcher at the Brazilian Centre for Analysis and Planning, characterized Bolsonaro's economic views as authoritarian neoliberalism.

As President of Brazil, Bolsonaro professed to be an open admirer of then-President of the United States, Donald Trump, during his first term. During Bolsonaro's campaign some observers saw similarities between the two's ideals, hardline attacks and a reputation for incendiary rhetoric, as well as social media presence. Because of this, Bolsonaro has been called the Brazilian equivalent of Trump or the "Trump of the Tropics".

=== Honorific order given to Olavo de Carvalho ===
On 1 May 2019 Bolsonaro awarded Olavo de Carvalho, a conservative writer and far-right conspiracy theorist, the Order of Rio Branco honorific order. Carvalho, who wrote books about leftist politics in Brazil and modern issues in general, was openly admired by Bolsonaro and sarcastically called by journalists his guru. Carvalho was sometimes harshly critical of Bolsonaro, even calling him "dumb".

=== Views on the Brazilian military dictatorship ===
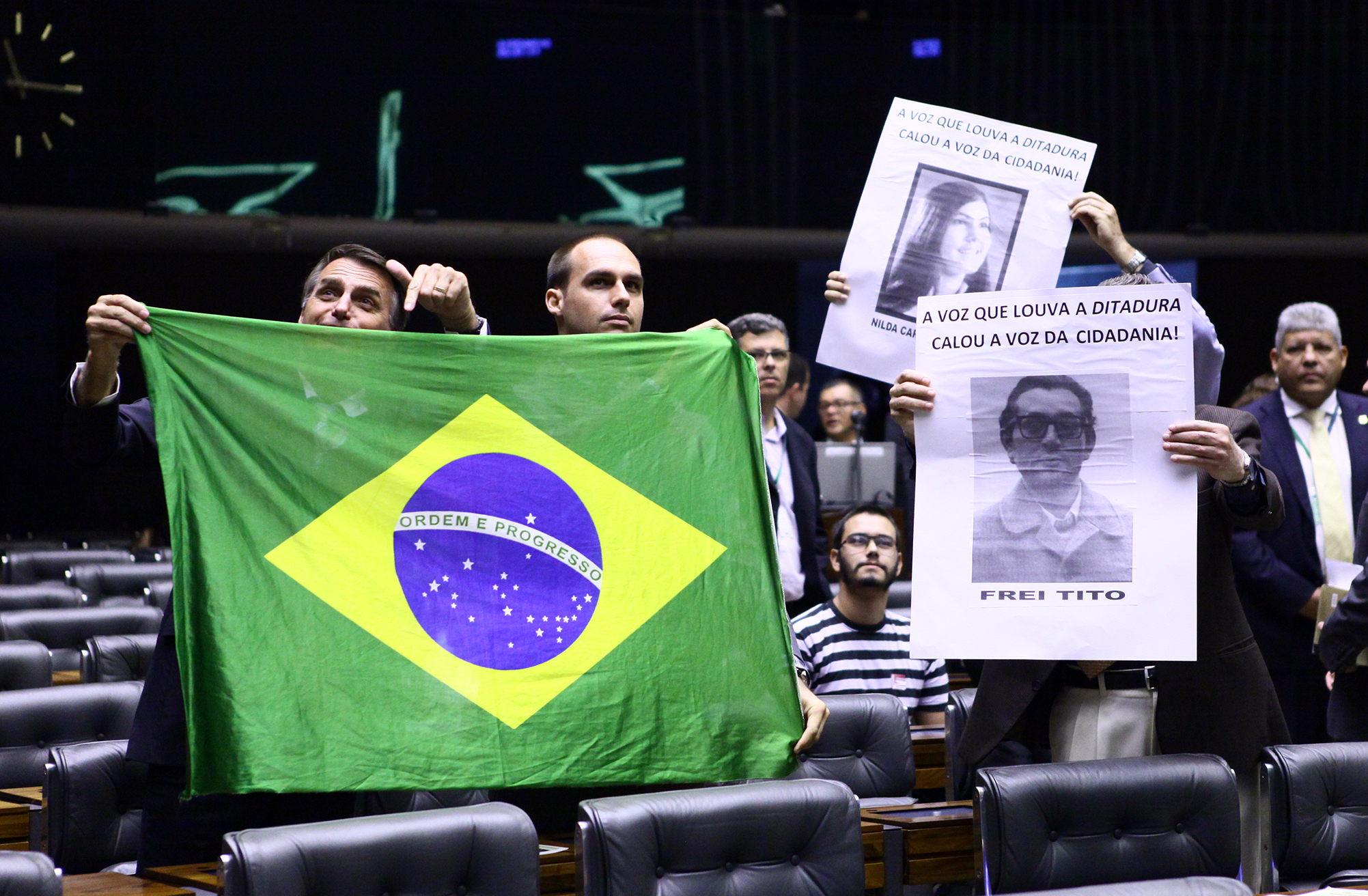
Bolsonaro and his son Eduardo hold up a Brazilian flag during a ceremony to mark the 50th anniversary of the 1964 military coup d'état, 1 April 2014.

Throughout his political career, Bolsonaro has made several admiring comments about the Brazilian military dictatorship, which ruled the country from 1964 to 1985. He said in 1993, eight years after the return of democracy, that the military regime had "led to a more sustainable and prosperous Brazil". He has publicly referred to the military dictatorship as a "glorious" period in Brazil's history, and that under the military dictatorship, Brazil enjoyed "20 years of order and progress". In December 2008 he said that "the error of the dictatorship was that it tortured, but did not kill".

Bolsonaro has repeatedly made admiring comments about a number of other Latin American dictatorships. He praised Peruvian president Alberto Fujimori as a role model for his use of military intervention via self-coup against the judiciary and legislature. In a 1998 interview with Veja magazine, Bolsonaro praised the Chilean dictatorship of Augusto Pinochet, and said the Pinochet regime, which killed over 3,000 Chilean citizens, "should have killed more people".

In 1999 Bolsonaro said that Hugo Chávez represented "hope for Latin America", comments that became a matter of controversy during the 2018 campaign, when Bolsonaro presented himself as a harsh critic of Chavismo. In 2019, already in power, Bolsonaro commended Paraguayan dictator Alfredo Stroessner as a "visionary" and "statesman", drawing immediate criticism, particularly due to multiple allegations of pedophilia against Stroessner. The comments were made in front of Paraguayan president Mario Abdo Benítez, himself a child of Stroessner's personal secretary, Mario Abdo Benítez Sr.

Speaking before his vote in favour of President Dilma Rousseff's impeachment amid the massive corruption scandal, Bolsonaro paid homage to Colonel Brilhante Ustra, an agent of Brazil's military dictatorship, and announced on the floor of the Chamber of Deputies that he was dedicating his pro-impeachment vote to Ustra's memory. Ustra had headed the DOI-CODI torture unit where Rousseff was allegedly tortured during the military dictatorship. The left-wing deputy Jean Wyllys spat at him after his statement during the same session. The congressman claimed to have suffered homophobic offenses from Jair Bolsonaro and his allies.

In a TV interview with Câmera Aberta in the 1990s, Bolsonaro said that if he ever became president, he would use this as an opportunity to shut down the National Congress and instigate a military coup himself. As of 2018, he appeared to have changed his mind, and said that if someone becomes the head of the country, it would be through voting. In March 2019 Bolsonaro stated that the 1964 coup d'état, which overthrew President João Goulart, was not a coup, and that 31 March, the day the coup was installed, should be "properly commemorated".

=== Foreign policy ===
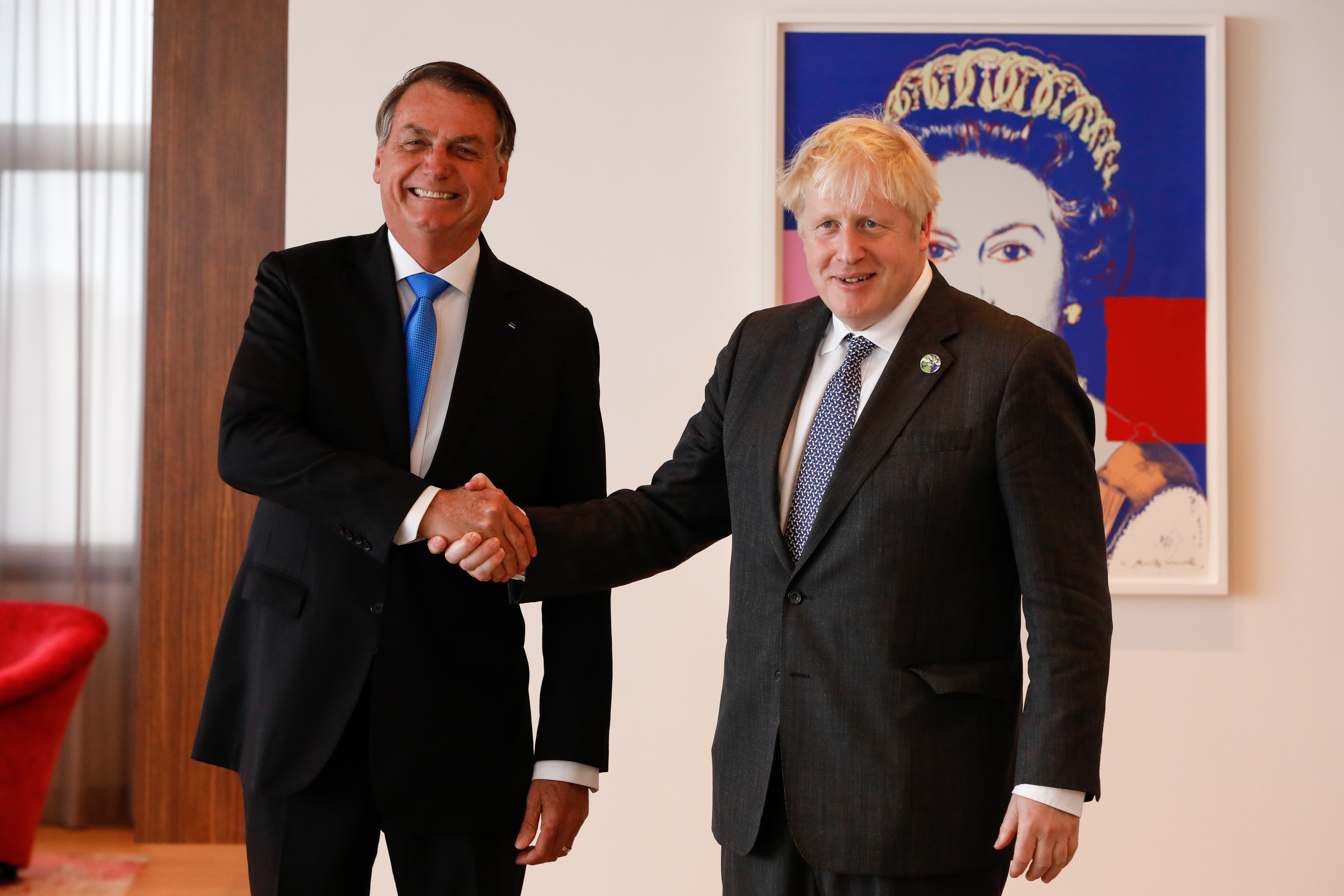
Bolsonaro with Boris Johnson, then the British prime minister, 20 September 2021

During the 2018 presidential campaign, Bolsonaro said he would make considerable changes to Brazil's foreign relations, saying that the "Itamaraty needs to be in service of the values that were always associated with the Brazilian people". He also said that Brazil should stop "praising dictators" and attacking democracies, such as the United States, Israel and Italy. In early 2018 he affirmed that his "trip to the five democratic countries the United States, Israel, Japan, South Korea, and Taiwan showed who we will be and we would like to join good people".

Bolsonaro showed distrust towards China throughout the presidential campaign claiming they "[want to] buy Brazil", although Brazil recorded a US$20 billion trade surplus with China in 2018, and China is only the 13th largest source of foreign direct investment into Brazil. Bolsonaro said he wished to continue to do business with the Chinese but he also said that Brazil should "make better [economic] deals" with other countries, with no "ideological agenda" behind it. His stance towards China has also been interpreted by some as an attempt to curry favor with the Trump administration to garner concessions from the US.

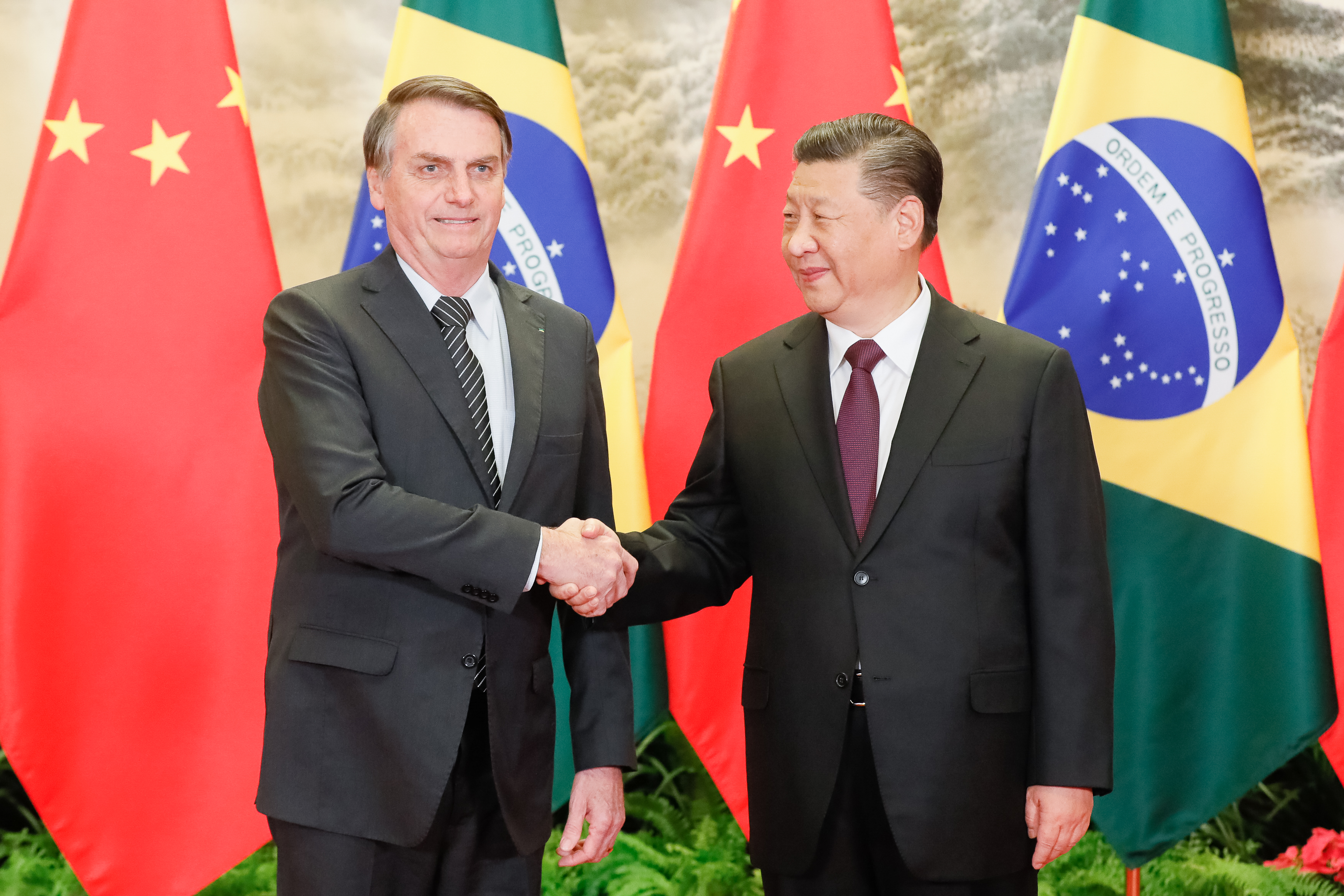
Bolsonaro with Chinese President Xi Jinping in October 2019

Bolsonaro mostly changed his position on China after he took office, saying that the two countries were "born to walk together" during his visit to Beijing in October 2019. He also said that Brazil would stay out of the ongoing China-US trade war. According to Oliver Stuenkel, Bolsonaro's stance on global politics evolved from anti-China to anti-Western during his presidency. In 2022 he praised the role of BRICS during the 2008 financial crisis and described BRICS cooperation as a "factor of stability and prosperity in the international situation".

Bolsonaro said that his first international trip as president would be to Israel. Bolsonaro also said that the State of Palestine "is not a country, so there should be no embassy here", adding that "you don't negotiate with terrorists." The announcement was warmly received by the prime minister of Israel, Benjamin Netanyahu, who welcomed Bolsonaro to Israel in March 2019 during the final weeks of a re-election campaign, but met condemnation from the Arab League, which warned Bolsonaro it could damage diplomatic ties. "I love Israel", Bolsonaro said in Hebrew at a welcoming ceremony, with Netanyahu at his side, at Ben Gurion Airport in Tel Aviv.

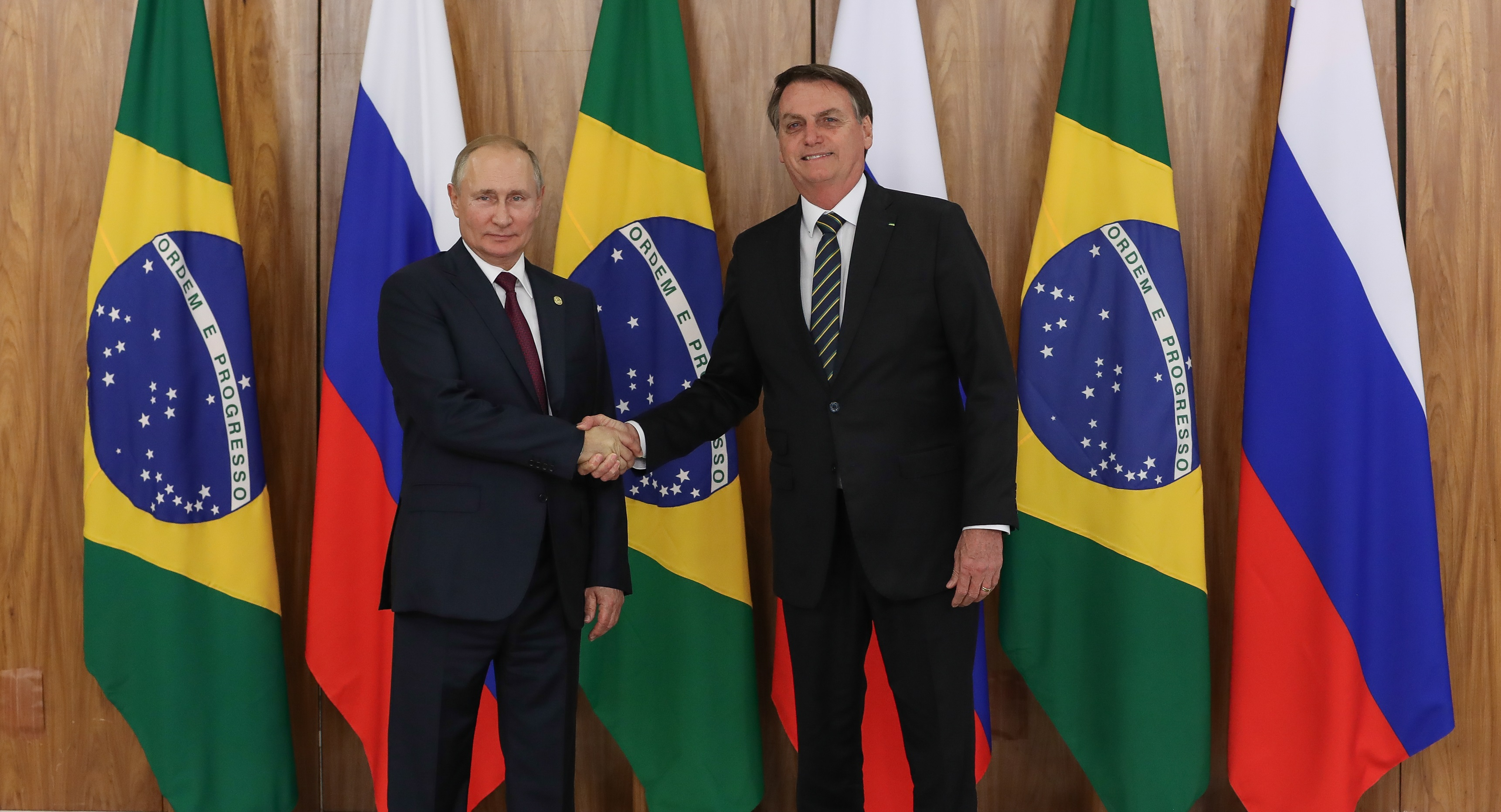
Bolsonaro with Russian President Vladimir Putin in November 2019

Bolsonaro also praised US President Donald Trump and his foreign policy, and has been called "the tropical Trump". His son Eduardo has indicated that Brazil should distance itself from Iran, sever ties with Nicolás Maduro's government in Venezuela and relocate Brazil's embassy in Israel to Jerusalem, although he never committed to his plan to move the embassy and instead opened a trade office in the city. Bolsonaro is widely considered the most pro-American candidate in Brazil since the 1980s. PSL members said that if elected, he would dramatically improve relations between the United States and Brazil.

During an October 2017 campaign rally in Miami, he saluted the American flag and led chants of "USA! USA!" to a large crowd. US National Security Advisor John Bolton praised Bolsonaro as a "like-minded" partner and said his victory was a "positive sign" for Latin America. Bolsonaro had a fractious relationship with US President Joe Biden, and subsequently deepened ties with Russia, emphasizing his neutrality over the 2022 Russian invasion of Ukraine.

At the regional level, Bolsonaro praised Argentine President Mauricio Macri for ending the 12-year rule of Néstor and Cristina Fernández de Kirchner, which he saw as similar to Lula and Rousseff. Although he does not have plans to leave the Mercosur, he criticized it for prioritizing ideological issues over economic ones. A staunch anti-communist, Bolsonaro has condemned Cuba's former leader Fidel Castro and the regime on that island as of 2018.

Bolsonaro praised British Prime Minister Winston Churchill, saying that he had learnt from Churchill: "Patriotism, love for your fatherland, respect for your flag – something that has been lost over the last few years here in Brazil ... and governing through example, especially at that difficult moment of the Second World War." Bolsonaro said he was open to the possibility of hosting a US military base in Brazil to counter Russian influence in the region. With the intention to persuade Trump to make Brazil a NATO member in March 2019, Bolsonaro said: "the discussions with the United States will begin in the coming months".

With formal US support for Brazil's entry to OECD in May 2019, Bolsonaro said, "currently, all 36 members of the organization support the entry of the country, fruit of confidence in the new Brazil being built, more free, open and fair". In October 2019, on a state visit to China, he announced the end of the need for visas for Chinese and Indian entry into Brazil. Brazil had already removed the need for visas for people from the US, Canada, Japan, and Australia.

=== Environment and climate change ===
The deforestation rate in Brazil surged by 72% during Bolsonaro's time in office, reflecting that Amazon development was his key policy position.

Brazil has the world's largest tropical rainforest in the Amazon basin. According to The Washington Post, "Bolsonaro is a powerful supporter of agribusiness ... and is likely to favor profits over preservation. ... Bolsonaro has chafed at foreign pressure to safeguard the Amazon rainforest, and he served notice to international nonprofit groups such as the World Wide Fund for Nature that he will not tolerate their agendas in Brazil. He has also come out strongly against lands reserved for indigenous tribes. Bolsonaro advisers additionally say that he plans to expand nuclear and hydroelectric power into the Amazon."

Bolsonaro rejects the scientific consensus on climate change. He repeatedly threatened to withdraw from the Paris Agreement during his campaign. Even before taking office, he backed out of Brazil's offer to host the 2019 UN Climate Change Conference. Ernesto Araújo, the new Minister of Foreign Affairs appointed by Bolsonaro, has called global warming a plot by "cultural Marxists", and eliminated the Climate Change Division of the ministry. Two departments of the Ministry of the Environment dealing with climate change in Brazil and mitigation and one dealing with deforestation were also eliminated.

In April 2019 the American Museum of Natural History canceled an event honouring Bolsonaro after facing heavy public criticism, including from New York Mayor Bill de Blasio. The museum's directorate justified its decision in a statement, "With mutual respect for the work and goals of our organizations, we jointly agreed that the Museum is not the optimal location for the Brazilian-Am. Chamber of Commerce gala dinner. This traditional event will go forward at another location on the original date and time." Bolsonaro supported plans to open the Reserva Nacional do Cobre e Associados (Renca) Amazonian reserve in Brazil's northern states of Pará and Amapá to commercial mining.

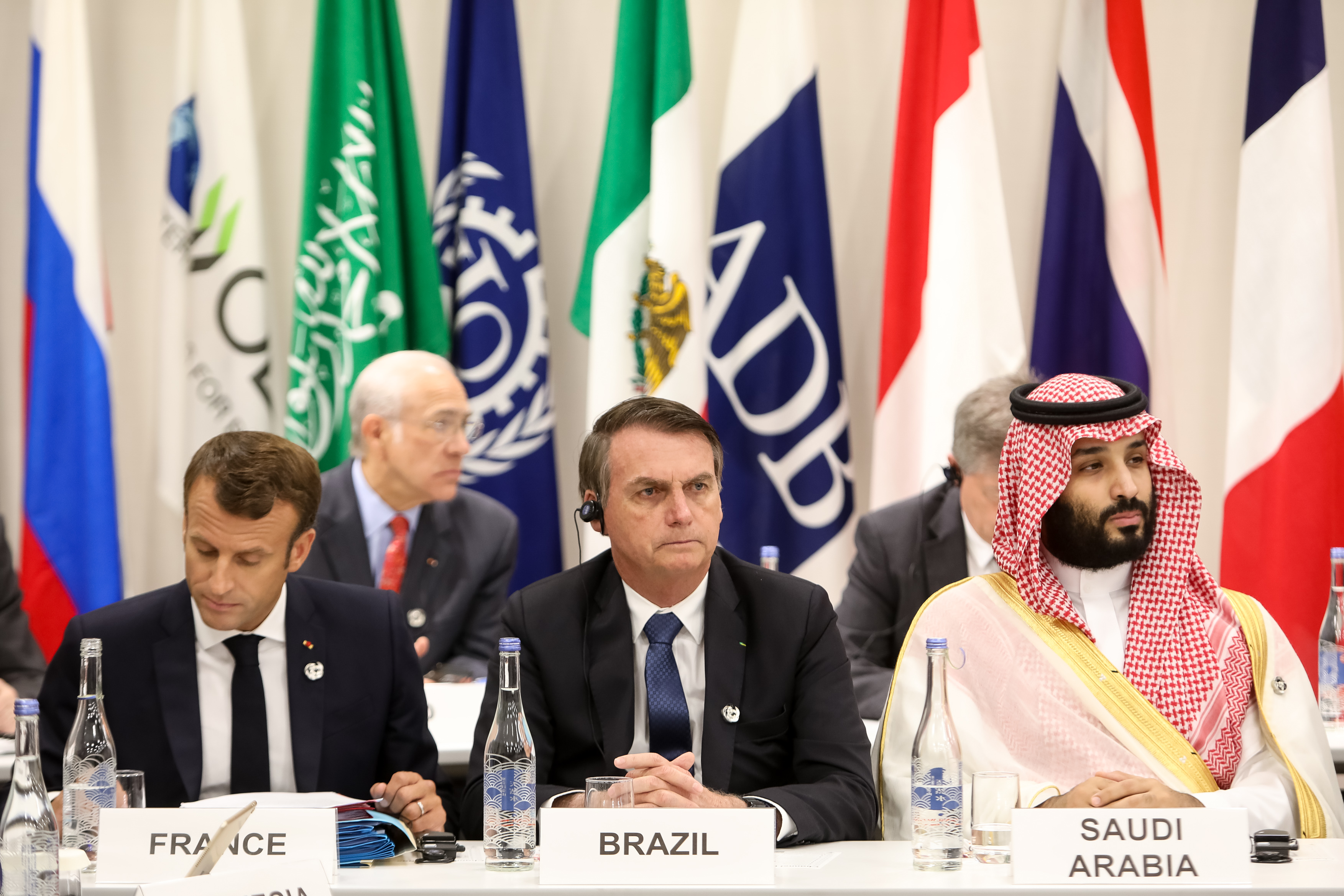
Bolsonaro, French President Emmanuel Macron and Saudi Crown Prince Mohammad bin Salman at the 2019 G20 Osaka summit

Destruction of the Amazon rainforest increased by 88% for the month of June 2019, during Bolsonaro's first year as president, as compared with the previous year, according to the National Institute for Space Research (INPE). Bolsonaro rejected the agency's data as false. The INPE director was fired after he rebutted Bolsonaro's criticism of the institute. The Bolsonaro administration decreased government efforts to combat illegal logging, ranching and mining in the Amazon. Government enforcement actions such as fines, warnings and the confiscation or destruction of illegal equipment in protected areas decreased by 20% in the first half of 2018 compared to the first half of 2017.

His damage to the Amazon has widely been described by indigenous groups, human rights groups, politicians, academics and journalists as an ecocide and a genocide. Indigenous chiefs and human rights organizations have submitted an Article 15 communication to the International Criminal Court for crimes against humanity and genocide for harm to Indigenous people and destruction of the Amazon. Another has been submitted for ecocide by indigenous chiefs.

=== Religion ===
Bolsonaro is registered as a Catholic with the Superior Electoral Court, while his wife and one of his sons are evangelicals. In 2016, Bolsonaro was re-baptized along with three of his sons, Flávio, Carlos and Eduardo, in the Jordan River by a member of a Pentecostal church. The sociologist Christina Vital of the Fluminense Federal University stated that this act was more than an expression of conversion to Evangelicalism and was meant to create an ambiguous religious identity, through which the Bolsonaro family could appeal to the various groups of voters.

Bolsonaro reportedly attended a Baptist church for 10 years. In a 2017 speech, Bolsonaro stated, "God above everything. There is no such thing as a secular state. The state is Christian, and any minority that is against this has to change, if they can." He later evolved his position to keeping the country a secular state during the first round of the Brazilian presidential elections: "We are going to make a government for everyone, regardless of religion. Even for atheists. We have almost 5% atheists in Brazil, and they have the same needs that others have."

=== Views on women ===
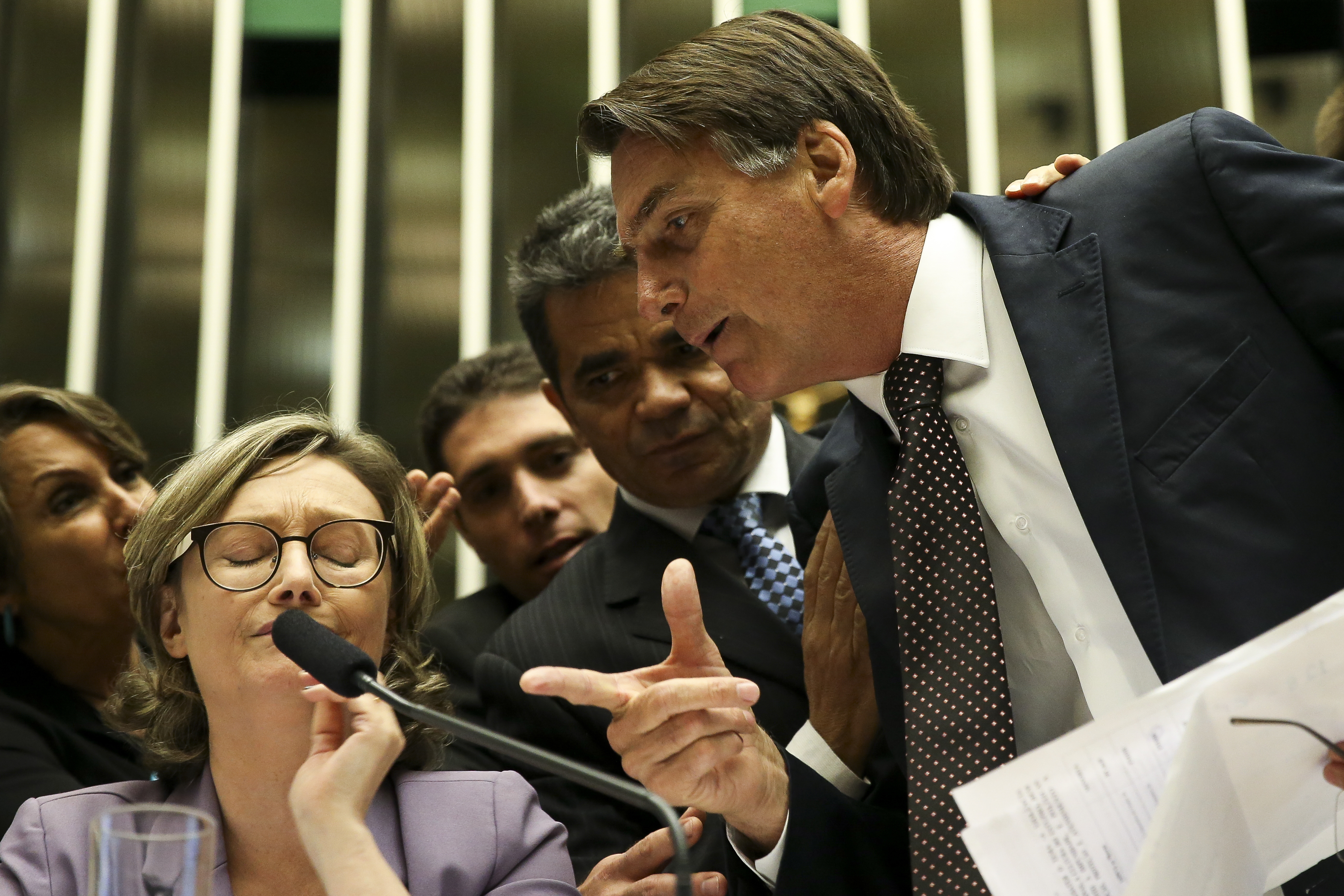
Bolsonaro arguing with federal deputy Maria do Rosário in the Chamber of Deputies, 14 September 2016

In an interview with Zero Hora in 2015, Bolsonaro argued that men and women should not receive the same salaries, because women get pregnant, adding that he believes federal law mandating paid maternity leave harms work productivity. Bolsonaro has denied saying that women should receive less than men; he claims it was statistical data by IBGE. In a public speech in April 2017, Bolsonaro said he had five children, that the first four were male and that for the fifth he produced a daughter out of "a moment of weakness".

Bolsonaro provoked controversy for a series of remarks made to and about Federal Deputy and former Human Rights Minister Maria do Rosário. During a Congressional debate, Bolsonaro said that minors should be treated as adults if they commit heinous crimes such as murder or rape, to which Maria do Rosário responded by calling him a "rapist". Bolsonaro then stated that Congresswoman Rosário was "not worth raping; she is very ugly".

The remarks drew considerable condemnation throughout Brazil. In the aftermath of these remarks, Bolsonaro was tried and convicted in a Federal court in September 2015 on counts of hedonic damages against Rosário. In June 2016 the Federal Supreme Court responded to a complaint filed by the Attorney General and decided to open two criminal actions against Bolsonaro. The Supreme Court ruled that he had potentially incited rape and defamed the honour of his fellow Deputy. He faced a penalty of up to six months of jail and a fine.

In August 2017, an appellate court upheld a lower court's verdict which found Bolsonaro guilty and sentenced him to pay a fine to Rosário of R$10,000 (roughly equivalent to US$2,500). This lawsuit was dismissed by the Supreme Federal Court as Bolsonaro was inaugurated as president in 2019 and acquired immunity from prosecution.

=== Views on homosexuality ===
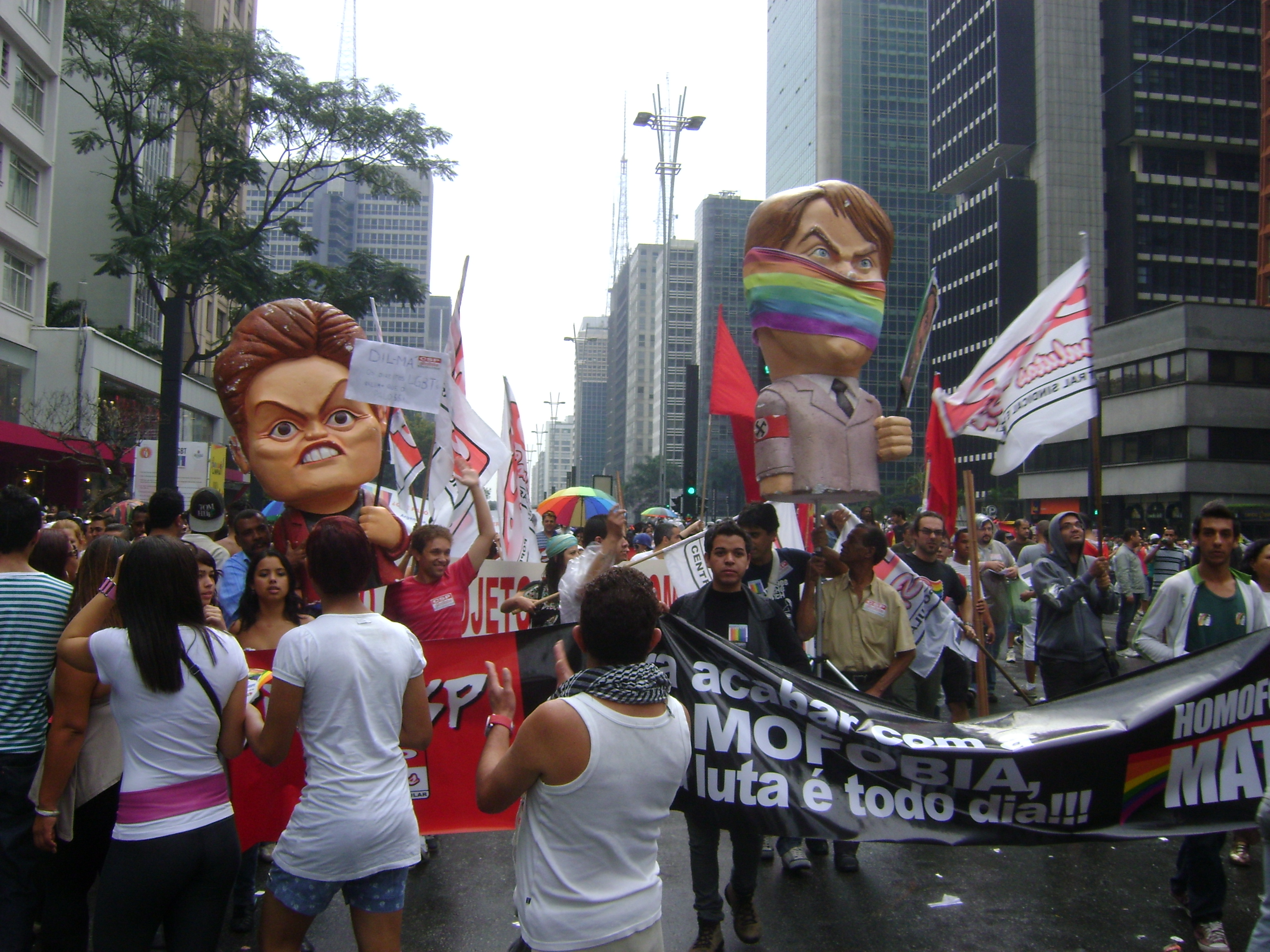
A Gay Pride parade in São Paulo, June 2011

In May 2002, after then-President Fernando Henrique Cardoso attended a pro-gay-marriage gathering, Bolsonaro said, "If I see two men kissing in the street, I will beat them." He later publicly defended beating gay children, saying, "If your child starts to become like that, a little bit gay, you take a whip and you change their behaviour." He also said, "If a kid hangs out with someone who uses marijuana, he'll end up snorting, and if he hangs out with gay person, he definitely is going to turn into a faggot."

In a June 2011 interview with Playboy, Bolsonaro said, "I would be incapable of loving a gay son", and added that he would prefer any gay son of his "to die in an accident". In an interview that same month with Jornal de Notícias, Bolsonaro linked homosexuality to paedophilia, saying, "many of the children who are adopted by gay couples will be abused by these couples". He further argued that Brazil does not need legislation specifically targeting homophobia, because "most homosexuals are murdered by their respective pimps at hours when good citizens are already asleep". In the British actor Stephen Fry's 2013 documentary Out There, Bolsonaro said, "no father is ever proud of having a gay son" and "we Brazilians do not like homosexuals".

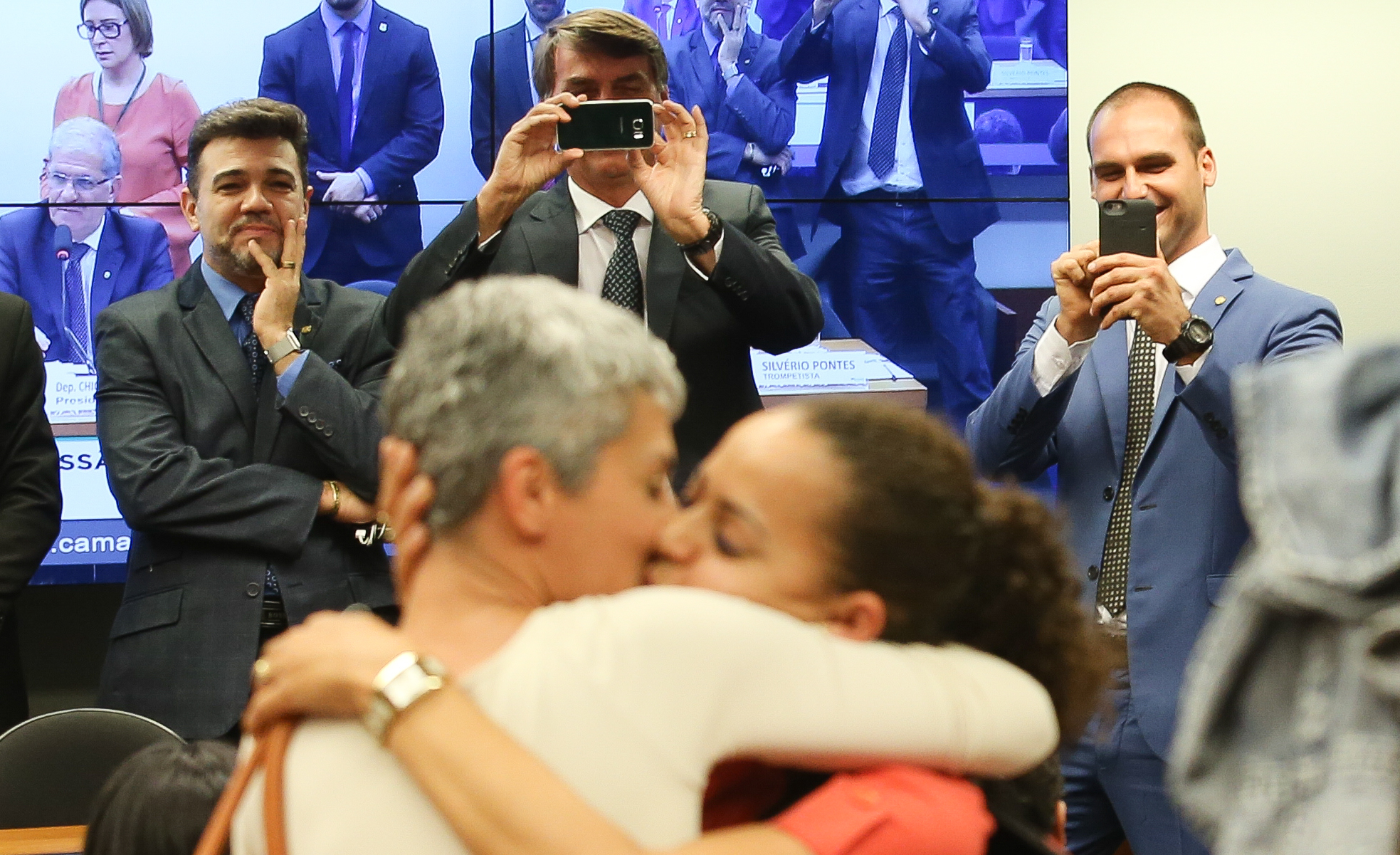
Bolsonaro and his son Eduardo, together with fellow-congressman Marco Feliciano, watching as a couple of protesters for LGBT rights kiss on the floor of the Committee on Culture of the Chamber of Deputies, May 2016

In a March 2016 video interview for Vice with Elliot Page, an openly lesbian actress at the time, Page asked Bolsonaro whether he should have been beaten as a child, alluding to Bolsonaro's public statements that gay children should be beaten. Bolsonaro replied, "You are very nice. If I were a cadet in the military academy and saw you on the street, I would whistle at you. All right? You are very pretty." Bolsonaro added, "Over time, due to liberal habits, drugs, with women also working, the number of homosexuals has really increased."

On 9 November 2017 the Court of Justice for the State of Rio de Janeiro sentenced Bolsonaro to pay a fine of R$150,000 for hate speech because of televised comments he made in 2011 to the Custe o Que Custar television programme, when Bolsonaro stated that "there is no risk" of his family producing a homosexual child because his children had a "good education". Judge Luciana Teixeira said that the deputy had abused his right of free expression to commit a wrongful act. "You cannot deliberately attack and humiliate, ignoring the principles of equality, just because you invoke freedom of expression", said the judge.

In January 2016, when he began to present himself as a pre-candidate to the Presidency of Brazil, Bolsonaro began to moderate his discourse on gay people by publishing a video on his official YouTube channel:

I have nothing to do with anyone's behaviour. If the husband and wife later decide to live with their partner, to form a couple, to live with a person of the same sex, they should and be happy. But we cannot state that, because of our omission in the Parliament, children become homosexuals in the future, or have such homosexual behaviour in the future, because the influence of school. That is unacceptable.

Since then, Bolsonaro states he has nothing against gays and that he only fights against the "gay kit" in schools. On 4 October 2018, for example, Bolsonaro said:

Each person, after a certain age, is responsible for their acts, and will take care of their life. For six-year-old children, this does not hold true. A father does not want to come home and see his son playing with a doll because of the influence of school. Homosexuals will be happy if I become president.

In October 2018, shortly before the first round of the Brazilian presidential elections, he said: "We are going to make a government for everybody. For gays, and some gays are fathers, who are mothers. It is a work for everyone". After being elected president, when asked by William Bonner in the Jornal Nacional about what he would say to those who are more prejudiced and aggressive against gays, Bolsonaro replied: "The aggression against a fellow man has to be punished in the way of law. And if [such aggression is committed] for a reason like this, you have to have your sentence increased."

=== Views on political violence ===
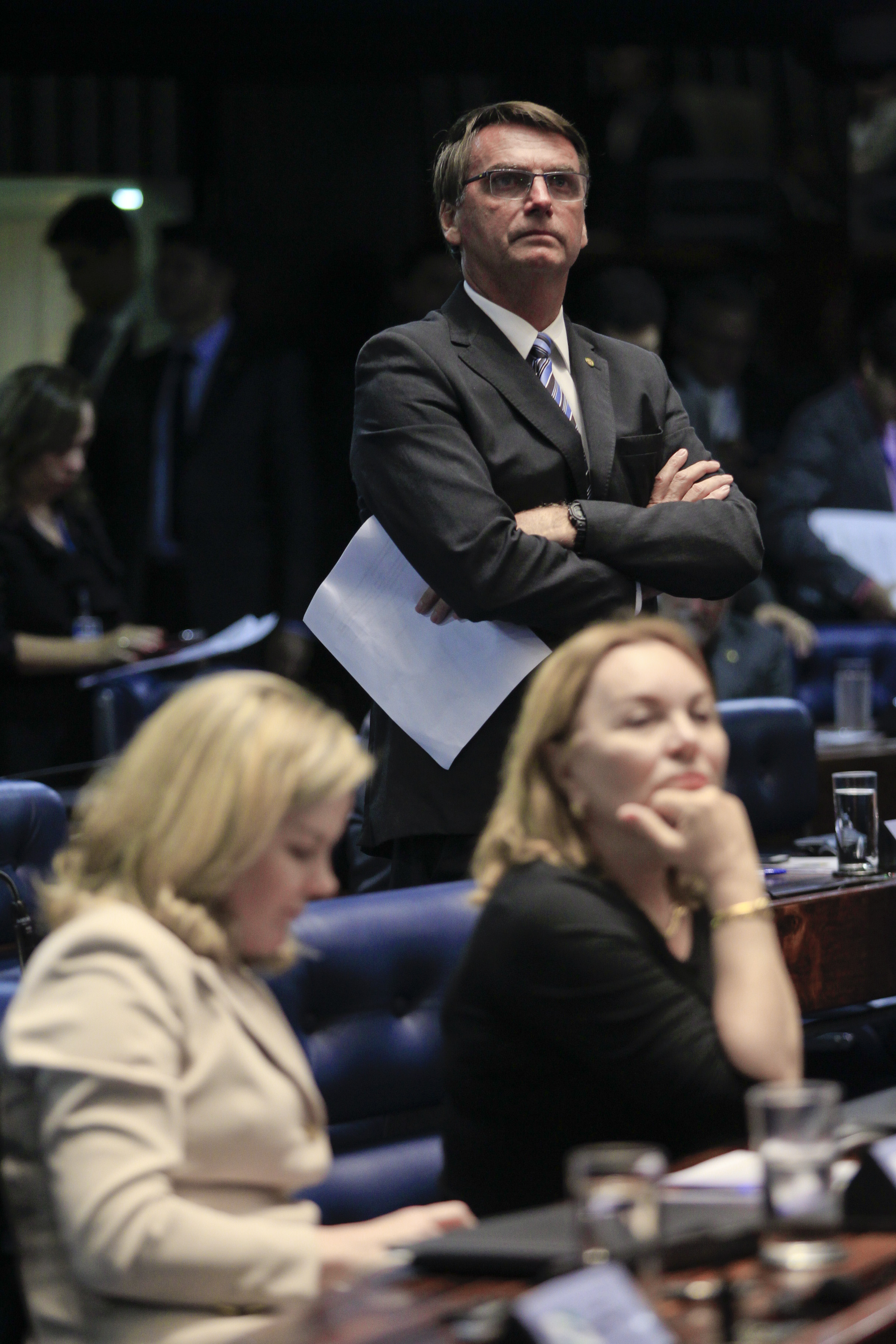
Bolsonaro visits the Federal Senate, March 2016.

On multiple occasions, Bolsonaro has publicly endorsed physical violence as a legitimate and necessary form of political action. In 1999, when he was 44 years old and a representative in the Brazilian Congress, Bolsonaro said during a TV interview that the only way of "changing" Brazil was by "killing thirty thousand people, beginning with Fernando Henrique Cardoso" (then President of Brazil).

During the 2018 campaign, he stated during a rally in Acre that the local "petralhas" (a derogatory term for members of the Workers' Party) would be "shot"; according to his aides, the statement was a "joke". One week before the second round, Bolsonaro said during a speech that in his administration "petralhas" and "reds" (i.e. leftists) would be arrested, purged or taken to the "corner of the beach", a term that was later revealed to mean a Navy base where dissidents of the Brazilian military dictatorship were murdered.

In 1999, talking about Chico Lopes, a former president of the Brazilian Central Bank who invoked his right to remain silent during a Congress hearing, Bolsonaro declared himself in favor of torture in this sort of situation. Asked about this phrase years later, Bolsonaro said: "Ask the father of a kidnapped child what he would like him to do to discover [where the kid is]. You have to take brutal measures, which some consider torture".

=== Views on race ===
Throughout his political career, Bolsonaro has made numerous statements that have been described as racist. In 2011, when asked by the Afro-Brazilian singer Preta Gil on TV show Custe o Que Custar (CQC) what he would do if one of his sons had a black girlfriend, he answered that he "would not discuss promiscuity" and that there was "no such risk", because his children were "very well educated". Bolsonaro later claimed that he was misunderstood and denied promoting racism, although he stood by his attacks on gay people.

In 2017, in an event at the Hebraica club in Rio de Janeiro, Bolsonaro promised to abolish all indigenous and Quilombola territories in Brazil, saying that he would not cede "a centimeter" of land to these groups. He also claimed to have visited a quilombo, a settlement formed by descendants of enslaved people, accusing Afro-Brazilians who lived there of being lazy and unproductive. The politician also claimed that the "least heavy" of the quilombolas weighed seven arrobas, a unit of measure that is used in Brazil to weigh cattle. These comments have been criticized as an attempt to dehumanize black Brazilians.

Bolsonaro is a strong opponent of affirmative action, and has criticized the Brazilian racial quotas system in universities as a way of dividing society that is at odds with equality between citizens. In 2011, he was accused of racism after questioning the capabilities of Black and indigenous graduates who benefitted from affirmative action, claiming that he would not fly on an airplane piloted by one of them, nor accept a doctor who was admitted to a university through racial quotas to perform surgery on him.

=== Birth control for the poor ===
In July 2008, Bolsonaro was criticized for remarks where he proposed providing birth control to poor people, whom he suggested might be too uneducated to understand family planning education. Bolsonaro said:

I wish Brazil had a family planning programme. It's not even worthy to talk about education when most of these [poor] people are not prepared to receive education, therefore they won't educate themselves. Only rigid birth control can save us from chaos. An educated man and woman will hardly desire an extra child with the sole purpose of engaging in a social welfare assistance programme [as it is nowadays]. We need to adopt a rigid birth control policy. We can't make demagogic speeches any longer, proposing bills and means of government to support these poor people [who] are increasingly proliferating throughout the country. ... People who aren't prepared to have children, shouldn't have them. This is what I stand for and I'm not worried about getting votes in the future. It's past time to discuss a policy to contain this demographic explosion, otherwise, we'll keep voting in this Chamber only matters such as Bolsa Família, loans for the poor, gas vouchers, etc. Methods [of birth control] have to be provided for those who, unfortunately, are ignorant and have no means to control their offspring. Because we [as upper-middle class] can control ours. Poor people don't control [theirs].

As a Congressman, Bolsonaro put forward three bills trying to remove "virtually all" legal restrictions to surgical sterilization via the public health system, including the reduction of "the minimum age of sterilization to 21 years". None of the bills were voted through.

=== Elections ===
Bolsonaro has endorsed conspiracy theories of voter fraud in past elections, including claims that attempts were made to rig the 2018 presidential election against him; he has also questioned the outcome of the 2020 United States presidential election. During his presidency, he has repeatedly challenged the legitimacy of electronic voting and advocated the use of paper ballots in the 2022 election. Bolsonaro said that he would not accept the results of the 2022 election if electoral reforms were not implemented. Experts on Brazilian politics, including defence minister Celso Amorim, questioned the likelihood of a coup attempt, and polls found that few Bolsonaro supporters would likely endorse a coup.

In May 2022, Central Intelligence Agency director William Burns warned Bolsonaro against any further attacks on Brazil's electoral system. The 2022 election occurred days after the success of far-right politician Giorgia Meloni in the 2022 Italian general election, with analysts noting that Bolsonaro performed better than expected during the first round of elections and that his party's success had the potential to moderate Lula's government if Lula won the election.

== Personal life ==
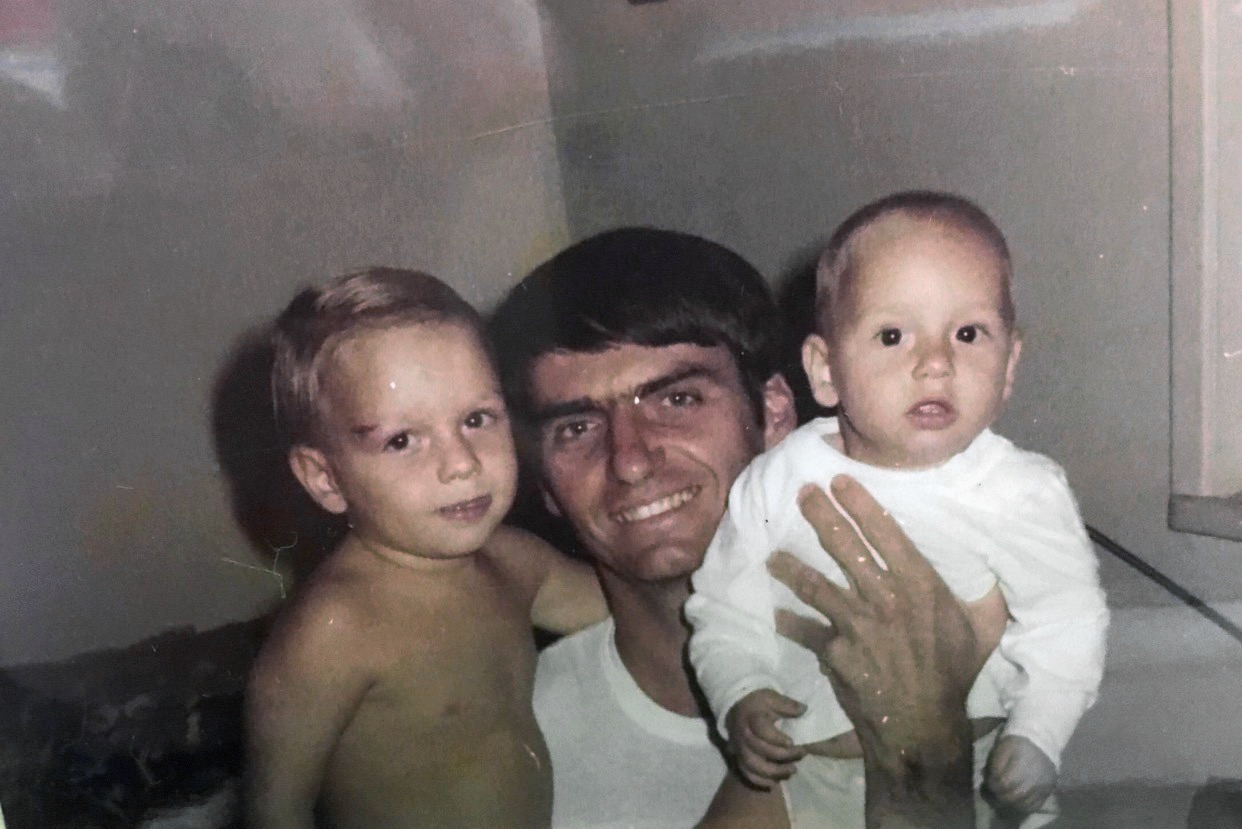
Bolsonaro with two of his sons, Eduardo and Flávio, in the late 1980s

Bolsonaro has been married three times and has five children. His first wife was Rogéria Nantes Braga, with whom he has three sons: Flávio, Carlos, and Eduardo. His second marriage was with Ana Cristina Valle, with whom he has a son, Jair Renan. In 2007, he married his third wife, Michelle de Paula Firmo Reinaldo, with whom he has a daughter named Laura.

While working in Congress, Bolsonaro hired Michelle as a secretary and over the next two years she received promotions and her salary more than tripled. He was forced to fire her after the Supreme Federal Court ruled that nepotism is illegal in the public administration. In 2018 Bolsonaro and his wife lived in Barra da Tijuca, Rio de Janeiro.

Bolsonaro has five grandchildren, 2 by Flávio, 2 by Eduardo, and 1 by Carlos. Bolsonaro is Catholic. On 25 October 2018 he was presented with an honorary black belt by Robson Gracie despite never having trained Brazilian jiu-jitsu.

On January 9, 2023, Bolsonaro was taken to AdventHealth Celebration with abdominal pain.

On September 16, 2025, Bolsonaro's son said he was transported to a hospital in Brasília after reportedly feeling sick. The next day, it was announced that Bolsonaro was diagnosed with an early type of skin cancer.

== Honours and awards ==
=== National honours ===
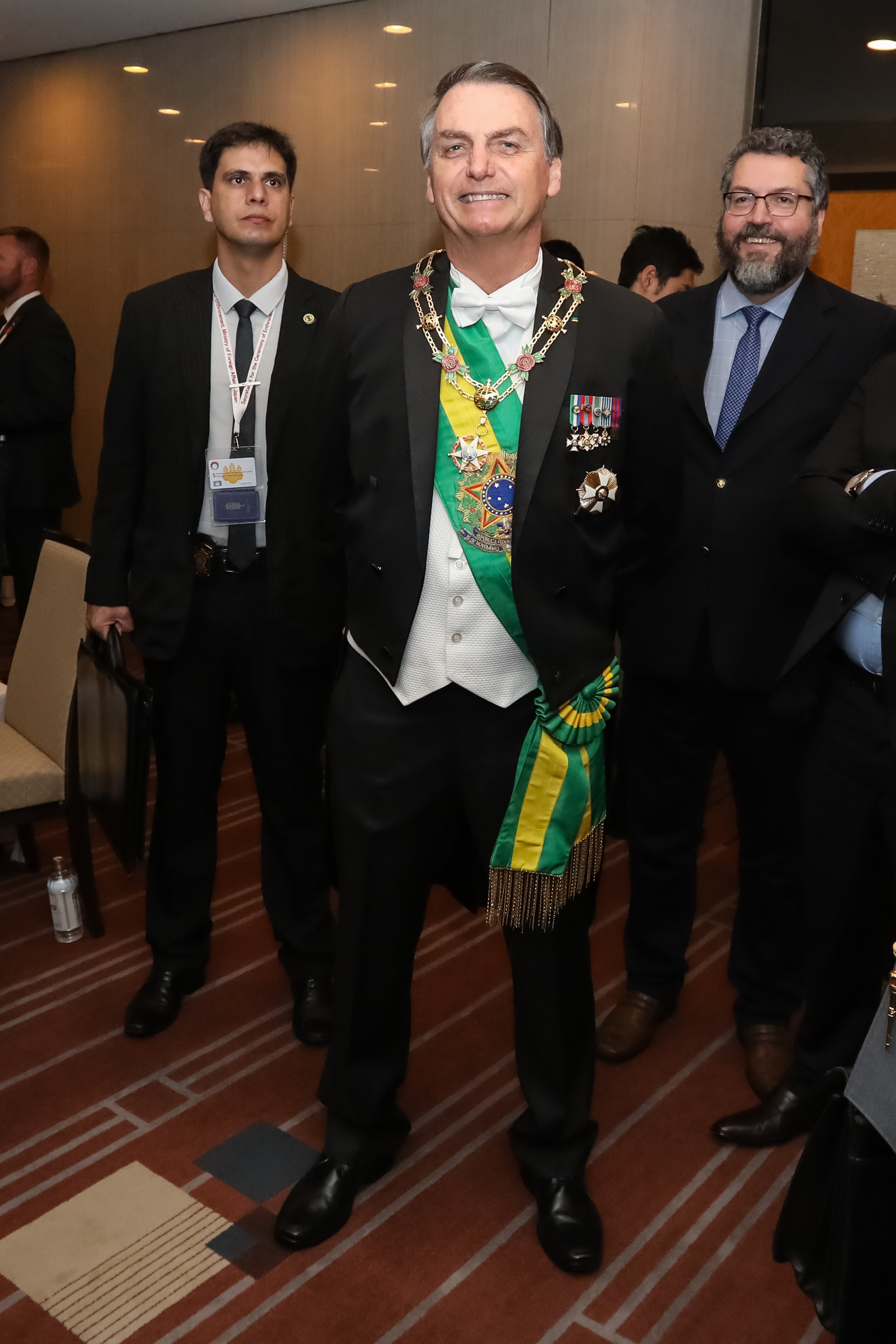
Bolsonaro wearing several Brazilian orders, decorations and medals with white tie and the presidential sash during the enthronement ceremony of Japanese Emperor Naruhito, October 2019

- Grand Master and Grand Cross of the Order of Rio Branco (1 January 2019)
- Grand Master and Grand Cross of the Order of Defence Merit (8 January 2019)
- Grand Master and Grand Cross of the Order of Military Merit (16 June 2019)
- Grand Master and Grand Cross of the Order of Naval Merit (8 January 2019)
- Grand Master and Grand Cross of the Order of Aeronautical Merit (3 January 2019)
- Grand Collar of the Order of Labour Judicial Merit (13 August 2019)
- Grand Cross of the Order of Military Judicial Merit (28 March 2019)
- The Mauá Medal of Merit (15 August 2019)
- The Peacemaker Medal (5 December 2018)

=== Awards ===
- One of Time magazine's 100 most influential people in 2019 and 2020
- Brazilian-American Chamber of Commerce's 2019 Person of the Year
- OCCRP's 2020 Person of the Year "for his role in promoting organized crime and corruption"
- On 25 October 2021 he was recognized as an honorary citizen by the city council of Anguillara Veneta, Italy, his paternal grandfather's hometown. This aroused reactions in Italy.

== Electoral history ==
Year	Election	Party	Office	Coalition	Partners	Party	Votes	Percent	Result
1990	State Elections of Rio de Janeiro	PDC	Federal Deputy	Progressive Alliance (PMDB, PFL, PTB, PRN, PDS, PDC)	—N/a		67,041	—N/a	Elected
1994	State Elections of Rio de Janeiro	PPR	Federal Deputy	Security, Education and Development (PSD, PPR)	—N/a		111,927	2.48%	Elected
1998	State Elections of Rio de Janeiro	PP	Federal Deputy	True Government (PFL, PPB, PTB)	—N/a		102,893	1.45%	Elected
2002	State Elections of Rio de Janeiro	PP	Federal Deputy	Rio Hope (PSB, PPB, PST, PTC, PSC, PRP, PSD, PGT)	—N/a		88,945	1.10%	Elected
2006	State Elections of Rio de Janeiro	PP	Federal Deputy	United for Rio (PMDB, PP, PTB, PL, PSC, PAN, PMN, PRONA, PTC)	—N/a		99,700	1.25%	Elected
2010	State Elections of Rio de Janeiro	PP	Federal Deputy	Together for Rio (PP, PDT, PT, PTB, PMDB, PSL, PTN, PSC, PSDC, PRTB, PHS, PMN, PTC, PSB, PRP, PCdoB)	—N/a		120,646	1.51%	Elected
2014	State Elections of Rio de Janeiro	PP	Federal Deputy	Rio in 1st Place (PMDB, PP, PSD, PSDB, DEM, PTB, SD, PSC, PPS, PEN, PHS, PMN, PRP, PSDC, PSL, PTC, PTB, PRTB, PPL)	—N/a		464,572	6.1%	Elected
2018	Presidential Election	PSL	President	Brazil Above Everything, God Above Everyone (PSL, PRTB)	Hamilton Mourão	PRTB	49,277,010	46.03%	Runoff
2018	Presidential Election	PSL	President	Brazil Above Everything, God Above Everyone (PSL, PRTB)	Hamilton Mourão	PRTB	57,797,847	55.13%	Elected
2022	Presidential Election	PL	President	For the Good of Brazil (PL, Republicanos, PP)	Walter Braga Netto	PL	51,072,345	43.20%	Runoff
2022	Presidential Election	PL	President	For the Good of Brazil (PL, Republicanos, PP)	Walter Braga Netto	PL	58,206,354	49.10%	Not elected

Party political offices
Preceded by Luciano Bivar	PSL nominee for President of Brazil; 2018	Party extinct
New office	National President of the Alliance for Brazil; 2019–2022	Party extinct
Political offices
Preceded by Michel Temer	President of Brazil; 2019–2023	Succeeded by Luiz Inácio Lula da Silva
