= Bolsonaro (surname) =

Bolsonaro is a surname originating from the northeastern Italian region of Veneto, where it is spelt Bolzonaro. The phonetic spelling of Bolsonaro is used by the branch of the family that migrated to Brazil in the late 19th century.

Notable people with the surname include:

- Carlos Bolsonaro (born 1982), Brazilian politician, Jair Bolsonaro's second son
- Eduardo Bolsonaro (born 1984), Brazilian lawyer, federal police officer and politician; Jair Bolsonaro's third son
- Fabiana Bolsonaro (born 1993), Brazilian politician; changed surname in 2022, not related to Jair Bolsonaro
- Flávio Bolsonaro (born 1981), Brazilian lawyer, entrepreneur and politician; Jair Bolsonaro's first son
- Jair Bolsonaro (born 1955), 38th President of Brazil
- Jair Renan Bolsonaro (born 1998), Brazilian politician; Jair Bolsonaro's fourth son
- Michelle Bolsonaro (born 1982), former First Lady of Brazil; Jair Bolsonaro's third wife
- Rogéria Bolsonaro (born 1960), Brazilian politician; Jair Bolsonaro's first wife
- Valéria Bolsonaro (born 1969), Brazilian politician; married to Jair Bolsonaro's second cousin
