= 2016 Rio de Janeiro mayoral election =

Municipal election in Brazil

- 2 October 2016 (first round); 30 October 2016 (second round)
- Opinion polls
- Turnout: 75.72% (first round); 73.15% (second round)
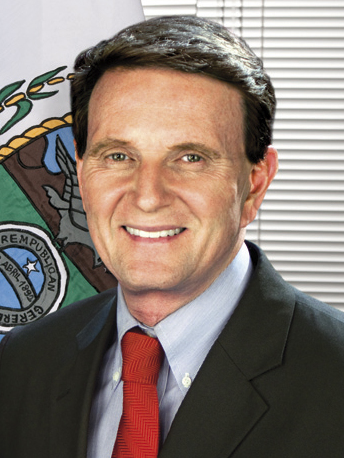

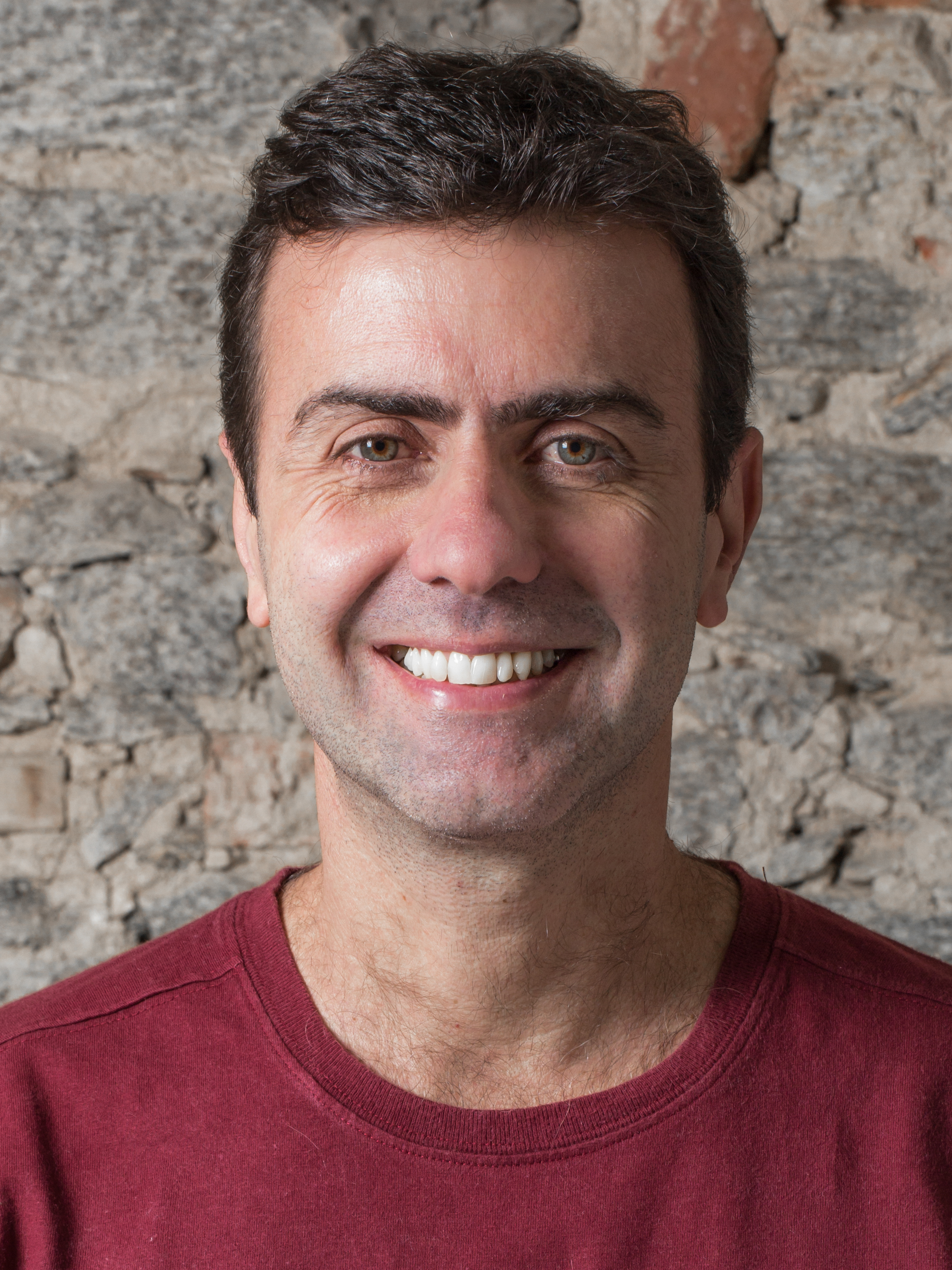
Candidate	Marcelo Crivella	Marcelo Freixo
Party	PRB	PSOL
Alliance	For a More Human Rio	Change is Possible
popular vote	1,700,030	1,163,662
Percentage	59.36%	40.64%
Mayor before election
Eduardo Paes
PMDB
Elected mayor
Marcelo Crivella
PRB

The 2016 Rio de Janeiro mayoral election took place on 2 October and 30 October 2016 to elect a Mayor, a Vice Mayor and 51 City Councillors for the administration of the city. The incumbent Mayor, Eduardo Paes of the Brazilian Democratic Movement Party (PMDB), was term-limited and couldn't run for re-election. The election took place against a backdrop of mass protests and the impeachment of president Dilma Rousseff of the Workers' Party (PT) earlier that year.

== Candidates ==
No.	Mayor	Vice-mayor	Party/Coalition
10	Marcelo Crivella (PRB)	Fernando Mac Dowell (PR)	"For a More Human Rio"; PRB, PR, PTN
15	Pedro Paulo (PMDB)	Cidinha Campos (PDT)	"Together for Rio"; PMDB, DEM, PDT, PHS, PMN, PP, PSDC, PTB, PEN, PROS, PRTB, PSL, SD, PTC, PTdoB
16	Cyro Garcia (PSTU)	Marília Macedo (PSTU)	Unified Workers' Socialist Party (PSTU)
18	Alessandro Molon (REDE)	Roberto Anderson (PV) "Everyone for Rio"; REDE, PV, PPL	
20	Flávio Bolsonaro (PSC)	Rodrigo Amorim (PRP)	"Rio Needs Strength to Change"; PSC, PRP
29	Thelma Bastos (PCO)	Wagner Rolo (PCO)	Labour Cause's Party (PCO)
30	Carmen Migueles (NOVO)	Tomas Pelosi (NOVO)	New Party (NOVO)
45	Carlos Osório (PSDB)	Aspásia Camargo (PSDB)	"Rio of Opportunities and Rights"; PSDB, PPS
50	Marcelo Freixo (PSOL)	Luciana Boiteux (PSOL)	"Change is Possible"; PSOL, PCB
55	Indio da Costa (PSD)	Hugo Leal (PSB)	"Together for Carioca"; PSD, PSB, PMB
65	Jandira Feghali (PCdoB)	Edson Santos (PT)	"Rio in Common"; PCdoB, PT

== Debates ==
=== First round ===
Date	Host	Moderator	Carlos Osório (PSDB)	Marcelo Crivella (PRB)	Jandira Feghali (PCdoB)	Flávio Bolsonaro (PSC)	Pedro Paulo (PMDB)	Alessandro Molon (REDE)	Indio da Costa (PSD)	Marcelo Freixo (PSOL)	Cyro Garcia (PSTU)	Thelma Bastos (PCO)	Carmen Migueles (NOVO)
25 August 2016	Band	Sérgio Costa	Present	Present	Present	Present	Present	Present	Present	Not invited	Not invited	Not invited	Not invited
9 September 2016	RedeTV!, Veja, UOL, Facebook	Mariana Godoy, Amanda Klein	Present	Present	Present	Present	Present	Present	Present	Present	Not invited	Not invited	Not invited
25 September 2016	RecordTV	Janine Borba	Present	Present	Present	Present	Present	Present	Present	Present	Not invited	Not invited	Not invited
29 September 2016	Rede Globo	Ana Paula Araújo	Present	Present	Present	Present	Present	Present	Present	Present	Not invited	Not invited	Not invited

=== Second round ===
Date	Host	Moderator	Marcelo Crivella (PRB)	Marcelo Freixo (PSOL)
7 October 2016	Band	Sérgio Costa	Present	Present
13 October 2016	SBT	N/A	Cancelled	
18 October 2016	RedeTV!, Veja, UOL, Facebook	Mariana Godoy, Amanda Klein	Present	Present
20 October 2016	O Globo	N/A	Cancelled	
23 October 2016	RecordTV	N/A	Cancelled	
28 October 2016	Rede Globo	Ana Paula Araújo	Present	Present

== Opinion polls ==
=== First round ===
Polling Firm/Link	Date(s) administered	Sample Size	PSOL	PCdoB	REDE	PSDB	PMDB	PSD	PRB	PSC	Others	Abst./ Undec.
2016 election	2 October 2016	3,708,857	18.26% (Freixo)	3.34% (Feghali)	1.43% (Molon)	8.62% (Osório)	16.12% (Paulo)	8.99% (Indio)	27.78% (Crivella)	14.00% (Bolsonaro)	1.46%	18.26%
Datafolha	30 September – 1 October 2016	2,159	13% (Freixo)	6% (Feghali)	2% (Molon)	8% (Osório)	10% (Paulo)	9% (Indio)	27% (Crivella)	7% (Bolsonaro)	1%	17%
Ibope	29 September – 1 October 2016	1,204	14% (Freixo)	7% (Feghali)	2% (Molon)	5% (Osório)	9% (Paulo)	8% (Indio)	31% (Crivella)	8% (Bolsonaro)	1%	19%
Instituto Gerp	28–29 September 2016	1,000	11% (Freixo)	4% (Feghali)	1% (Molon)	3% (Osório)	9% (Paulo)	4% (Indio)	35% (Crivella)	8% (Bolsonaro)	0%	25%
Datafolha	26 September 2016	1,144	10% (Paulo)	7% (Feghali)	1% (Molon)	6% (Osório)	11% (Paulo)	5% (Indio)	29% (Crivella)	7% (Bolsonaro)	2%	22%
Ibope	23–25 September 2016	1,204	9% (Freixo)	6% (Feghali)	1% (Molon)	4% (Osório)	11% (Paulo)	8% (Indio)	35% (Crivella)	6% (Bolsonaro)	1%	19%
Instituto Gerp	19–21 September 2016	1,000	10% (Freixo)	8% (Feghali)	2% (Molon)	2% (Osório)	6% (Paulo)	3% (Indio)	33% (Crivella)	8% (Bolsonaro)	0%	28%
IBPS	19–21 September 2016	3,510	10% (Freixo)	7% (Feghali)	1% (Molon)	4% (Osório)	10% (Paulo)	6% (Indio)	30% (Crivella)	6% (Bolsonaro)	1%	25%
Datafolha	21 September 2016	1,023	10% (Freixo)	9% (Feghali)	2% (Molon)	4% (Osório)	9% (Paulo)	6% (Indio)	31% (Crivella)	7% (Bolsonaro)	1%	21%
Ibope	12–13 September 2016	805	9% (Freixo)	8% (Feghali)	1% (Molon)	3% (Osório)	9% (Paulo)	7% (Indio)	31% (Crivella)	8% (Bolsonaro)	1%	23%
Datafolha	8 September 2016	928	11% (Freixo)	8% (Feghali)	1% (Molon)	4% (Osório)	8% (Paulo)	6% (Indio)	29% (Crivella)	6% (Bolsonaro)	0%	26%
Paraná Pesquisas	1–5 September 2016	940	10.4% (Freixo)	7.7% (Feghali)	1.8% (Molon)	3.5% (Osório)	8.6% (Paulo)	5.7% (Indio)	33.4% (Crivella)	8.3% (Bolsonaro)	1.1%	19.3
Datafolha	23–24 August 2016	928	11% (Freixo)	7% (Feghali)	2% (Molon)	3% (Osório)	5% (Paulo)	4% (Indio)	28% (Crivella)	9% (Bolsonaro)	1%	29%
Instituto Gerp	19–22 August 2016	1,000	10% (Freixo)	7% (Feghali)	2% (Molon)	1% (Osório)	6% (Paulo)	3% (Indio)	33% (Crivella)	9% (Bolsonaro)	1%	28%
Ibope	20–22 August 2016	805	12% (Freixo)	6% (Feghali)	2% (Molon)	6% (Osório)	6% (Paulo)	5% (Indio)	27% (Crivella)	11% (Bolsonaro)	2%	25%
2012 election	7 October 2012	3,754,393	28.15% (Freixo)	–	–	2.47% (Leite)	64.6% (Paes)	–	–	–	4.78%	13.51%

=== Second round ===
Polling Firm/Link	Date(s) administered	Sample Size	PSOL	PRB	Abst./ Undec.
2016 election	31 October 2016	3,583,094	40.64% (Freixo)	59.36% (Crivella)	20.08%
Ibope	28–29 September 2016	1,024	32% (Freixo)	43% (Crivella)	25%
Datafolha	28–29 September 2016	2,384	30% (Freixo)	43% (Crivella)	27%
Ibope	26–27 October 2016	1,204	29% (Freixo)	46% (Crivella)	25%
Datafolha	25 October 2016	1,280	27% (Freixo)	46% (Crivella)	27%
Ibope	17–19 October 2016	1,101	29% (Freixo)	46% (Crivella)	25%
Datafolha	13–14 October 2016	1,152	25% (Freixo)	48% (Crivella)	27%
Ibope	5–6 October 2016	1,101	25% (Freixo)	51% (Crivella)	24%
Datafolha	5–6 October 2016	1,151	27% (Freixo)	44% (Crivella)	28%

== Results ==
=== Mayor ===
Candidate	Party	Running mate	Party	First round		Second round	
Candidate	Party	Running mate	Party	Votes	%	Votes	%
Marcelo Crivella	PRB	Fernando Mac Dowell	PR	842,201	27.78	1,700,030	59.36
Marcelo Freixo	PSOL	Luciana Boiteux	PSOL	553,424	18.26	1,163,662	40.64
Pedro Paulo	PMDB	Cidinha Campos	PDT	488,775	16.12		
Flávio Bolsonaro	PSC	Rodrigo Amorim	PRP	424,307	14.00		
Indio da Costa	PSD	Hugo Leal	PSB	272,500	8.99		
Carlos Osório	PSDB	Aspásia Camargo	PSDB	261,286	8.62		
Jandira Feghali	PCdoB	Edson Santos	PT	101,133	3.31		
Alessandro Molon	REDE	Roberto Anderson	PV	43,426	1.43		
Carmen Migueles	NOVO	Tomas Pelosi	NOVO	38,512	1.27		
Cyro Garcia	PSTU	Marília Macedo	PSTU	5,729	0.19		
Thelma Bastos (Note: The candidate had her candidacy banned by the Superior Electoral Court. Because of that, her votes were not considered.)	PCO	Wagner Rolo	PCO	0	0.00		
Invalid/blank votes				677,434	–	719,402	–
Turnout				3,708,857	75.72	3,583,094	73.15
Abstentions				1,183,187	24.28	1,314,950	26.85
Source: Tribunal Superior Eleitoral

Popular vote (first round)
Crivella	27.78%
Freixo	18.26%
Paulo	16.12%
Bolsonaro	14.0%
Indio	8.99%
Osório	8.62%
Feghali	3.34%
Molon	1.43%
Other	1.46%

Popular vote (second round)
Crivella	59.36%
Freixo	40.64%

=== City Councillors ===
Candidate	Party	Voting	
Candidate	Party	Percentage	Total
Carlos Bolsonaro	PSC	3.65%	106,657
Tarcísio Motta	PSOL	3.10%	90,473
César Maia	DEM	2.45%	71,468
Rosa Fernandes	PMDB	1.98%	57,868
Marielle Franco	PSOL	1.59%	46,502
Junior da Lucinha	PMDB	1.54%	45,124
Vera Lins	PP	1.24%	36,117
João Mendes de Jesus	PRB	1.08%	31,516
Teresa Bergher	PSDB	1.05	30,566
Leandro Lyra	NOVO	1.00%	29,217
Carlo Caiado	DEM	0.96%	28,122
Jorge Felippe	PMDB	0.96%	28,104
Jairinho	PMDB	0.89%	26,047
Thiago Ribeiro	PMDB	0.85%	27,900
Alexandre Isquierdo	DEM	0.85%	24,701
Marcelinho D'Almeida	DEM	0.83%	24,116
Chiquinho Brazão	PMDB	0.82%	23,923
Tânia Bastos	PRB	0.78%	22,930
Rafael Aloísio Freitas	PMDB	0.78%	22,897
Bispo Inaldo Silva	PRB	0.78%	22,753
Zico	PTB	0.74%	21,565
Willian Coelho	PMDB	0.68%	20,678
Verônica Costa	PMDB	0.68%	19,946
Carlos Eduardo	SD	0.68%	19,822
Reimont	PT	0.67%	19,626
Renato Cinco	PSOL	0.59%	17,162
Luciana Novaes	PT	0.57%	16,679
Marcelo Arar	PTB	0.56%	16,230
Val	PEN	0.53%	15,388
Paula Messina	PROS	0.53%	15,346
Rogério Rocal	PTB	0.52%	15,055
Dr. João Ricardo	PMDB	0.51%	14,994
Renato Moura	PDT	0.46%	13,572
Marcello Siciliano	PHS	0.46%	13,553
Dr. Jorge Manaia	SD	0.45%	13.249
Paulo Pinheiro	PSOL	0.45%	13,141
Jones Moura	PSD	0.44%	12,722
Dr. Gilberto	PMN	0.42%	12,162
Fernando William	PDT	0.41%	12,055
Leonel Brizola Neto	PSOL	0.38%	11,087
Eliseu Kessler	PSD	0.37%	10,777
Felipe Michel	PSDB	0.35%	10,262
Cláudio Castro	PSC	0.35%	10,262
Professor Adalmir	PSDB	0.30%	8,804
Professor Célio Lupparelli	DEM	0.30%	8,692
Luiz Carlos Ramos Filho	PTN	0.29%	8,618
Jair da Mendes Gomes	PMN	0.28%	8,112
Zico Bacana	PHS	0.27%	7,932
Otoni de Paula Jr.	PSC	0.27%	7,801
David Miranda	PSOL	0.24%	7,012
Italo Ciba	PTdoB	0.21%	6,023
