= Bolsonaro Jr. =

Bolsonaro Jr. usually refers to Flávio Bolsonaro, the eldest son of Jair Bolsonaro, but it could also refer to his other sons, including:

- Carlos Bolsonaro (born 1982)
- Eduardo Bolsonaro (born 1984)
- Jair Renan Bolsonaro (born 1998)

== See also ==
- Bolsonaro (surname)
- Michelle Bolsonaro (born 1982), Jair Bolsonaro’s third and present wife
