= Adilson Barroso =

Brazilian politician (born 1964)

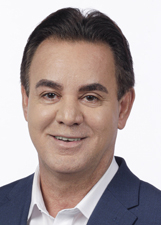
- Barroso in 2022

Federal Deputy
- Incumbent
- Assumed office 2 February 2023
- Constituency: São Paulo

Councillor of Barrinha
- In office 1 January 2017 – 1 January 2021
- Constituency: At-large
- In office 1 January 1989 – 1 January 1997
- Constituency: At-large

State Deputy of São Paulo
- In office 15 February 2003 – 31 January 2007
- Constituency: At-large

Personal details
- Born: Adilson Barroso Oliveira; 14 June 1964 (age 62) Minas Novas, Minas Gerais, Brazil
- Party: PL (since 2022)
- Other political affiliations: PTB (1987–1990); PFL (1990–2001); PRONA (2001–2004); PSC (2004–2007); PSL (2007–2012); Patriota (2012–2022)
- Children: Fabiana Barroso

Adilson Barroso Oliveira (born 14 June 1964) is a Brazilian politician serving as a member of the Chamber of Deputies since 2023. From 2003 to 2007, he was a member of the Legislative Assembly of São Paulo.

== Electoral history ==
Year	Election	Party	Office	Coalition	Partners	Party	Votes	Percent	Result
1988	Municipal Election of Barrinha	PTB	Councillor	—N/a			140	1.66%	Elected
1992	Municipal Election of Barrinha	PFL	Councillor	—N/a			201	2.01%	Elected
1996	Municipal Election of Barrinha	PFL	Vice Mayor	PFL, PSD	Marcos Marcari	PSD	5,327	47.29%	Elected
2000	Municipal Election of Barrinha	PFL	Vice Mayor	PPB, PDT, PTB, PSL, PL, PPS, PFL, PSB, PSD	Marcos Marcari	PSD	6,966	51.01%	Elected
2002	State Elections of São Paulo	PRONA	State Deputy	—N/a			9,928	0.05%	Elected
2006	State Elections of São Paulo	PSC	State Deputy	—N/a			23,091	0.11%	Surrogate
2010	State Elections of São Paulo	PSL	State Deputy	—N/a			5,862	0.03%	Not elected
2014	State Elections of São Paulo	PEN	Federal Deputy	—N/a			35,238	0.17%	Not elected
2016	Municipal Election of Barrinha	PEN	Councillor	—N/a			497	2.69%	Elected
2018	State Elections of São Paulo	Patriota	Federal Deputy	—N/a			42,717	0.20%	Not elected
2022	State Elections of São Paulo	PL	Federal Deputy	—N/a			62,445	0.26%	Surrogate
