= Fabiana Bolsonaro =

Brazilian politician (born 1993)

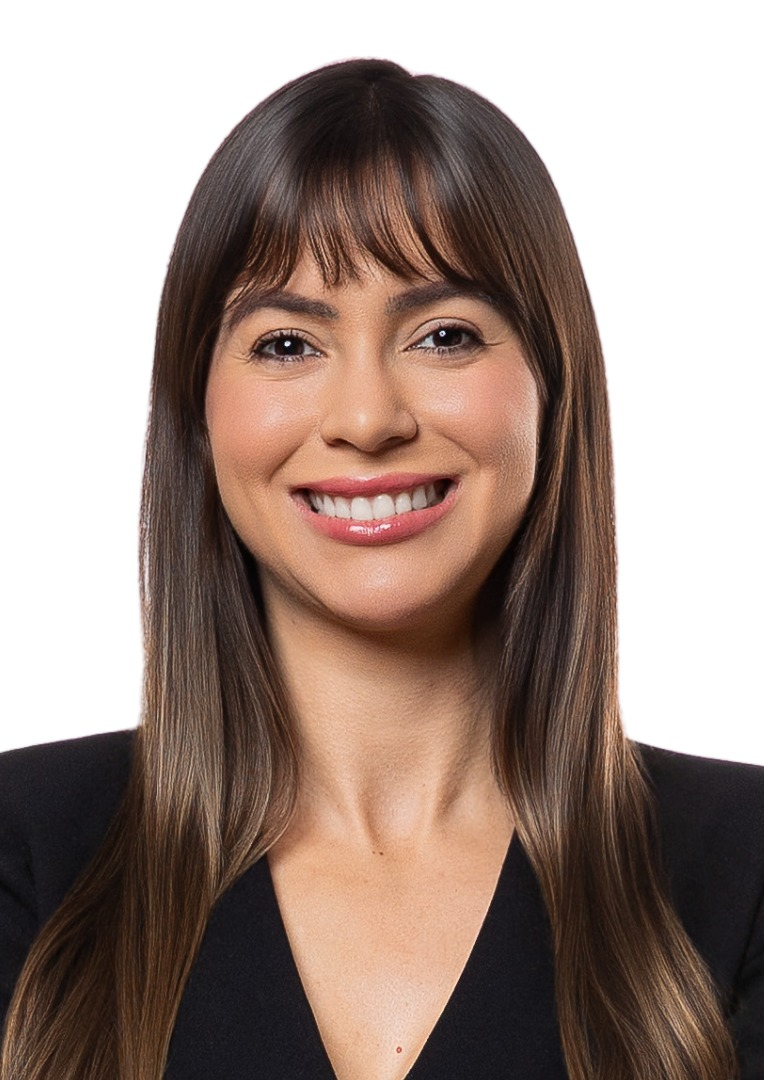
- Official portrait, 2023

Member of the Legislative Assembly of São Paulo
- Incumbent
- Assumed office March 15, 2023

Vice Mayor of Barrinha
- In office January 1, 2021 – March 15, 2023

Personal details
- Born: Fabiana de Lima Barroso Souza; April 10, 1993 (age 33) Barrinha, São Paulo, Brazil
- Party: Liberal Party (since 2022)
- Other political affiliations: Patriota (2013-2022)
- Parent: Adilson Barroso (father)

Fabiana de Lima Barroso Souza (born April 10, 1993), known as Fabiana Bolsonaro, is a Brazilian politician serving as a member of the Legislative Assembly of São Paulo since 2023. A member of the Liberal Party (PL), she previously served as vice mayor of Barrinha from 2021 to 2023 and as the municipality's secretary of Social Development. Born and raised in Barrinha, São Paulo, she studied law and is the daughter of federal deputy Adilson Barroso.

Bolsonaro is known for her conservative Christian views; she self-identifies as a pro-family politician who opposes abortion and drug legalization. In the Assembly, she sits on the main Budget and Constitutional committees (CFOP and CCJ) and also serves on committees for people with disabilities, women's rights, and science & technology. She is very active in her party's legislative caucus and has taken leadership roles such as acting rapporteur for São Paulo's 2024–2027 multi-year budget plan (Plano Plurianual).

== Early life and education ==
Fabiana Bolsonaro was born and raised in Barrinha, São Paulo. She earned a degree in law and later studied journalism and public management. Her father is federal deputy Adilson Barroso (PL).

== Political career ==
=== Municipal government ===
In 2020, at age 27, Bolsonaro was elected vice-mayor of Barrinha, making her the youngest woman in Brazil to hold that office at the time. She also served as Barrinha's Social Development Secretary.

=== State legislature ===
In the 2022 elections, Bolsonaro ran for the São Paulo Legislative Assembly on the PL ticket. She won with 65,497 votes (0.28% of valid votes). On ballots her name appeared as "Fabiana B." after the electoral court prohibited using "Bolsonaro". She took office on March 15, 2023. In ALESP she serves on the Finance, Budget and Planning (CFOP) and Constitution and Justice (CCJ) committees. She also serves on committees for defense of disabled persons, women's rights, and science & technology. In late 2023 she was rapporteur for the state's 2024–2027 PPA, approving colleagues' amendments (35 subamendments) in the budget report. Her legislative focus includes fiscal planning, infrastructure, and public safety. She is a member of the Assembly's Evangelical Caucus.

=== 2026 "blackface" incident and investigations ===
On March 18, 2026, during a legislative session, Fabiana Bolsonaro appeared with her face and arms painted dark brown while arguing against the appointment of transgender federal deputy Erika Hilton as chair of the federal Commission for the Defence of Women's Rights. She said she was conducting a "social experiment," asking if she "became black" by painting herself. The act drew immediate criticism; colleagues and media labeled it blackface and racist. Eighteen state deputies filed ethics complaints against her for racism and transphobia, and two PSOL legislators filed a police report on racial intolerance. Bolsonaro denied racist intent, calling her act an analogy or experiment. The Assembly's Ethics Council and the São Paulo Public Prosecutor opened inquiries into the episode.

== Early life and education ==
Fabiana Bolsonaro is married to Marcos Aurélio (a Matão city official), they have one daughter. In June 2023 the Matão city council awarded her the honorary title "Cidadã Matonense" for her service to the community. She is an active churchgoer and frequently cites her Christian faith in speeches. Her father, Adilson Barroso, is a longtime federal deputy for São Paulo (PL).
