= Hugo Leal =

Hugo Leal may refer to:

- Hugo Leal (footballer) (born 1980), Portuguese footballer
- Hugo Leal (politician) (born 1962), Brazilian politician
