= Carlos Osorio =

Carlos Osorio may refer to:

- Carlos Manuel Arana Osorio, military officer and politician, president of Guatemala
- Carlos Roberto Osório, Brazilian businessman

== See also ==
- Estádio Carlos Osório, a stadium in Oliveira de Azeméis, Aveiro, Portugal
