= Thaise Guedes =

Brazilian politician

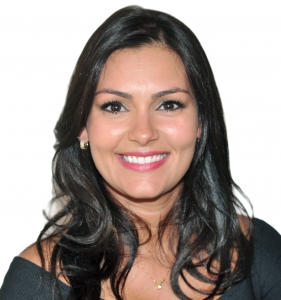
- Born: Thaise de Souza Guedes; September 24, 1987 (age 37)

Thaise de Souza Guedes is a Brazilian politician.

At the age of thirteen, she contracted meningococcal meningitis and had her upper and lower limbs amputated due to the negligence of public hospitals.

In 2008 Thaise ran for councilor for Maceió by the Social Christian Party (Brazil), being elected one of the newest councilor in Brazil with 4,739 votes.

In 2010, she ran for a seat in the Legislative Assembly of Alagoas, becoming the youngest state deputy in the body, elected with 36,804 votes.

In the 2018 state elections, she ran for re-election to the Legislative Assembly, but was defeated.
