= Flávio Bolsonaro =

Brazilian politician (born 1981)

Flávio Bolsonaro GOMN GORB
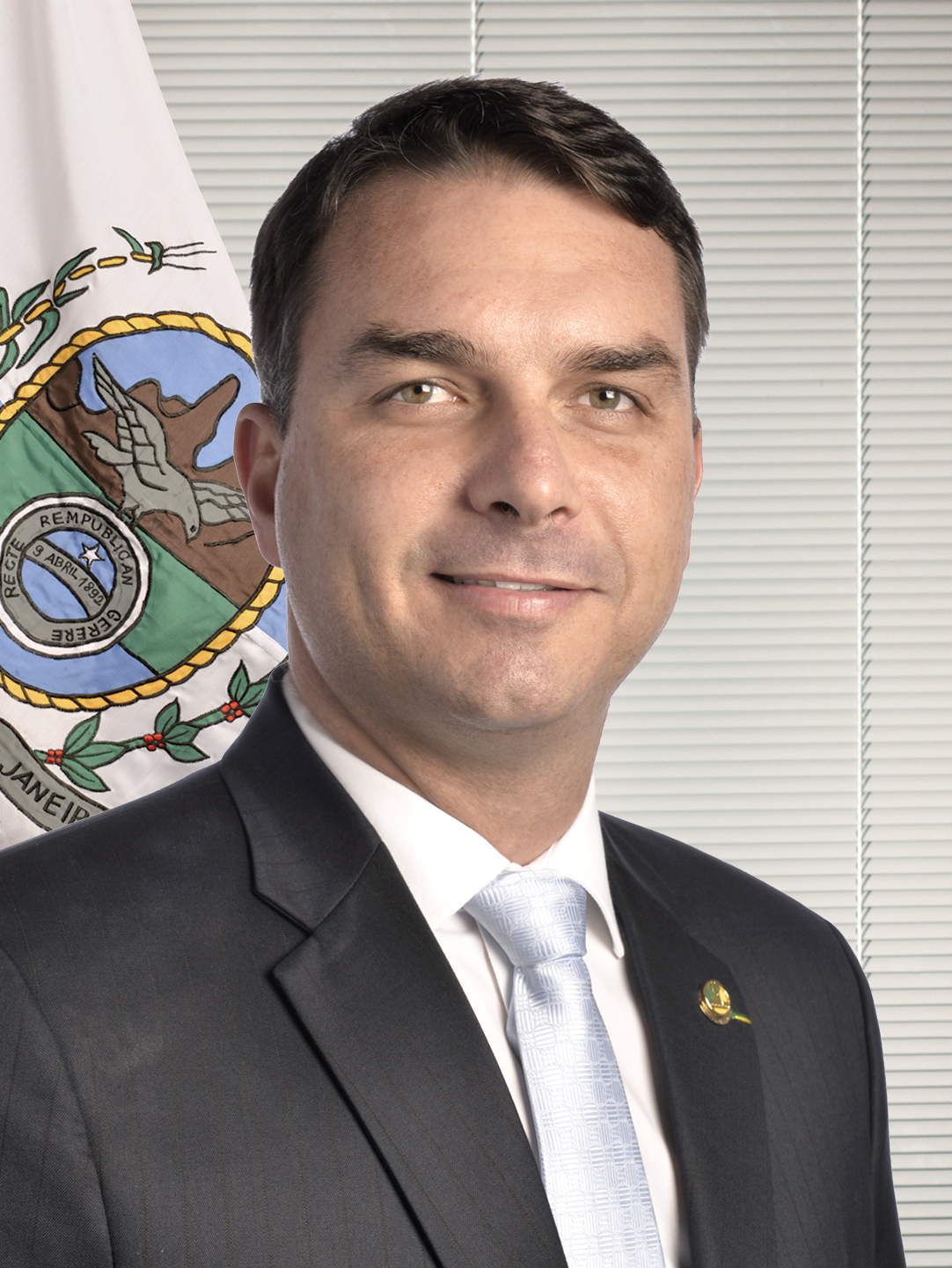
- Official portrait, 2019

Member of the Federal Senate
- Incumbent
- Assumed office 1 February 2019
- Preceded by: Lindbergh Farias
- Constituency: Rio de Janeiro

State Deputy of Rio de Janeiro
- In office 1 February 2003 – 1 February 2019
- Constituency: At-large

Personal details
- Born: Flávio Nantes Bolsonaro; 30 April 1981 (age 45) Resende, Rio de Janeiro, Brazil
- Citizenship: Brazil; Italy (since 2023)
- Party: PL (2021–present)
- Other political affiliations: PPB (2001–2003); PP (2003–2005, 2005–2016); PFL (2005); PSC (2016–2018); PSL (2018–2019); Republicanos (2020–2021); Patriota (2021)
- Spouse: Fernanda Antunes Figueira (m. 2010)
- Children: 2
- Parents: Jair Bolsonaro (father); Rogéria Bolsonaro (mother)
- Relatives: Carlos Bolsonaro (brother); Eduardo Bolsonaro (brother); Jair Renan Bolsonaro (half-brother); Michelle Bolsonaro (stepmother)
- Education: Candido Mendes University (LLB)
- Occupation: Politician; businessman; lawyer
- Website: flaviobolsonaro.com.br
- Bolsonaro's voice Bolsonaro after being defeated by Lula, stating the result was a "dirty trick"; less than 48 hours later, he fled to the US; Recorded 26 October 2026

Flávio Nantes Bolsonaro (Brazilian Portuguese: [ˈflavju bowsoˈnaɾu]; born 30 April 1981) is a Brazilian lawyer and conservative politician serving as a senator for Rio de Janeiro since 2019. A son of the 38th president of Brazil, Jair Bolsonaro, he is affiliated with the Liberal Party (PL). He previously served as a state deputy of Rio de Janeiro from 2003 to 2019. As a state deputy, Bolsonaro held the presidency of the Special Committee on Family Planning. His political career culminated in his election to the Senate in 2018, where he garnered 4.38 million votes.

His political career has been closely associated with his father and has included controversial positions on Brazil's military dictatorship, criminal justice, and the death penalty, as well as involvement in the Rachadinhas corruption investigation, a scheme to embezzle some of the salaries of parliamentary advisors. He is also being investigated in connection with the Banco Master scandal, due to an alleged transaction of 134 million reais related to former banker Daniel Vorcaro and the financing of the film Dark Horse, which was to portray the life of Jair Bolsonaro, leading to an investigation by the Federal Police (PF) on suspicion of money laundering, corruption, and tax evasion.

Bolsonaro was the PL candidate in the 2026 presidential election with the endorsement of his father, losing to incumbent president (and Jair's 2022 opponent) Lula da Silva in the second round after placing first in the first round. He is the first Brazilian presidential candidate to place first in the first round but lose in the second round. After losing the election, he did not accept the results, fled to the United States with the help of a former Mossad agent and in a private jet whose owner has ties to individuals convicted in the US for money laundering and narcotrafficking, and proclaimed himself the "true president-elect" in a letter with coup-like undertones; however, his own party, world leaders, and Brazil's Superior Electoral Court (TSE) recognized Lula's victory. Later, Bolsonaro changed the wording to "leader" following an order by the US government. He is currently under criminal investigation in Brazil for alleged acts of corruption, money laundering, and currency evasion.

== Early life and education ==
Flávio Nantes Bolsonaro was born in Resende, Rio de Janeiro, at the Military Academy of Agulhas Negras, to Jair Bolsonaro and Rogéria Nantes Braga. He graduated from Candido Mendes University with a bachelor of laws degree. During his time at university, he was also officially employed in a full-time, 40-hour-per-week position at the leadership office of the PPB party in the Chamber of Deputies in Brasília. Reporting by BBC Brasil later highlighted a conflict between his official employment in Brasília and his simultaneous in-person attendance at law school and at a volunteer internship at the Public Defender's Office in Rio de Janeiro. He holds specializations in public policy from the University Research Institute of Rio de Janeiro and in entrepreneurship from the Getúlio Vargas Foundation.

== Political career ==
=== State deputy (2003–2019) ===
Bolsonaro was elected to his first term in the 2002 Brazilian general election. He was re-elected as a state deputy in 2006, 2010, and in his last candidacy, in 2014, for the 2015–2019 period. In April 2015, he voted in favor of the appointment of Domingos Brazão to the Rio de Janeiro State Court of Accounts. Brazão would later be accused of being behind the 2018 assassination of Rio de Janeiro city councillor and political activist Marielle Franco (1979–2018).

==== Relationship with Adriano da Nóbrega and defense of militias ====
During his time as state deputy, Bolsonaro was repeatedly close to Adriano da Nóbrega, a police officer later accused of being a member of the militia known as the Escritório do Crime ("Crime Office"). In 2003 he made a motion of praise for Nóbrega, then a lieutenant, for his work as a police officer. The following year Nóbrega was arrested for killing a parking attendant, and in 2005, while Nóbrega was still imprisoned, Bolsonaro awarded him the Tiradentes Medal.

In 2007, re-elected the previous year, Bolsonaro gave a speech at the Legislative Assembly of Rio de Janeiro defending militias. That year, in a press interview, he again defended the position and considered a bill to legalize militias.

In 2007, Bolsonaro appointed Nóbrega's then-wife to his office, a post she held for 11 years. Evidence later gathered in Operation Gargoyle indicated that she was a "ghost employee", receiving a salary without working.

In 2008, during the installation of the parliamentary inquiry into militias in the assembly, Bolsonaro again defended militiamen in a speech. In 2011, after the murder of judge Patricia Acioli, who investigated militias, he said she had "humiliated police officers", according to Veja. He also spoke in defense of detainees at the Special Prison Battalion after a judge was assaulted there.

Bolsonaro's connection to Nóbrega's family continued in 2016, when he appointed Nóbrega's mother to his office. Both women remained in their posts until 2018, when Bolsonaro was elected senator, amid the emergence of the so-called rachadinha (salary-skimming) suspicions. In 2019, as senator, he opposed the installation of a parliamentary inquiry into militias.

On 12 April 2016, Bolsonaro and his bodyguard, who is also a military police officer, exchanged gunfire with two robbers who were holding up a car ahead of them in Rio de Janeiro's West Zone. One of the assailants was injured and fled on a motorcycle. Like other members of the Bolsonaro family, he opposes what he calls "the media exploitation of human rights enforcement for the benefit of crime and criminals."

==== Caso Queiroz and embezzlement accusation ====
In December 2018, a report from the Council for Financial Activities Control (COAF) identified atypical movements totaling R$ 1,236,838 in an account held by Fabrício José Carlos de Queiroz, a military police officer and former parliamentary advisor to Flávio Bolsonaro, between 1 January 2016 and 31 January 2017. Queiroz, who had worked as Bolsonaro's driver and bodyguard, was dismissed from the state deputy's office on 15 October 2018. According to the bank responsible for the account, his transactions were incompatible with his assets, economic activity and financial capacity.

The report, which the Federal Public Ministry (MPF) attached to the investigation that led to Operation Furna da Onça, also cited transactions totaling R$ 324,774 in cash and R$ 41,930 in cleared cheques in Queiroz's account, including a cheque for R$ 24,000 made out to Michelle Bolsonaro, wife of Jair Bolsonaro. According to the September 2018 payroll of the Legislative Assembly of Rio de Janeiro (Alerj), Queiroz received a salary of R$ 8,517 as a commissioned parliamentary advisor in Bolsonaro's office, in addition to R$ 12,600 a month from the Military Police of Rio de Janeiro State. The report also identified cash deposits and transfers from eight employees who had worked or were working in Bolsonaro's office between January 2016 and January 2017, including Queiroz's daughter and his wife, who transferred about R$ 86,000 and R$ 19,000 respectively. The movements raised suspicion of a practice known as "rachadinha", in which officeholders keep part of their staff's salaries. To support the accusation, the MP also examined the geolocation of staff mobile phones and found that eight advisors were rarely within 750 metres of the Alerj between 2007 and 2018.

The 422-page COAF report contained information on bank operations by 75 employees and former employees of the Alerj, including Queiroz, cited in suspicious-transaction reports. The suspicious operations involved people who worked or had worked in 20 state deputies' offices of different ideological persuasions and totaled more than R$ 207 million. In an interview with SBT Brasil on 26 December 2018, Queiroz said he obtained money by buying and reselling cars, that he would explain the deposits to the MPF, and that Bolsonaro had nothing to do with the transactions. Bolsonaro's office said Queiroz had worked for more than ten years as the deputy's bodyguard and driver, that the parliamentarian was not aware of anything that would discredit his conduct, and that Queiroz had been dismissed in October 2018 so that he could deal with matters related to his transfer to the paid reserve as a sub-lieutenant in the Military Police. The MPF confirmed that it had included the Coaf report in its investigations but said that not all the names in the document were under investigation, since not all atypical movements were necessarily illegal.

On 17 January 2019, Bolsonaro, citing the privileged jurisdiction he would have as a senator-elect, asked the Supreme Federal Court (STF) to suspend the investigation into Queiroz; the request was granted by justice Luiz Fux. The following day, Jornal Nacional reported that it had obtained parts of a COAF report showing that between June and July 2017 there had been 48 deposits of about R$ 2,000 each, totaling approximately R$ 96,000, into Bolsonaro's bank account, which the COAF considered atypical. On 27 September 2019, the investigation was suspended by STF justice Gilmar Mendes; the decision was revoked after the STF ruled in November 2019 that data could be shared by the Receita Federal. Bolsonaro denied the accusations and said he believed the investigation would establish the truth.

On 18 June 2020, Queiroz was arrested at the home of lawyer Frederick Wassef in Atibaia. The operation was carried out by the São Paulo Civil Police and the São Paulo Public Prosecutor's Office after arrest and search warrants were issued by the Rio de Janeiro Court of Justice at the request of the Rio de Janeiro Public Prosecutor's Office. On 19 October 2020, the Rio de Janeiro Public Prosecutor's Office filed charges against Bolsonaro, Queiroz and 15 other people. In November 2021, the Superior Court of Justice (STJ) annulled the first-instance decisions that had broken the banking and tax secrecy of Bolsonaro and 102 other targets. The same month, the STF annulled four of the five COAF Financial Intelligence Reports that underpinned the investigation. In May 2022, the charges were rejected and later archived by the Rio de Janeiro Court of Justice in light of the STF's decision annulling the evidence gathered by the Rio de Janeiro Public Prosecutor's Office from COAF. In July 2024, in the context of Operation Última Milha, a 2020 recording of a meeting between Jair Bolsonaro, Alexandre Ramagem, Augusto Heleno and Flávio Bolsonaro's lawyers became public; its content indicated an attempt to obstruct the investigations. On the same day, Jair Bolsonaro was reported to have said that Flávio would be the "most to blame" in Operation Furna da Onça. The Federal Police said that the Brazilian Intelligence Agency (Abin), during Jair Bolsonaro's government, had illegally spied on Receita Federal auditors who were investigating Flávio Bolsonaro; he denied any irregular conduct and said that his confidential data had been accessed criminally from within the Receita Federal.

=== Candidacy for Mayor of Rio de Janeiro (2016) ===
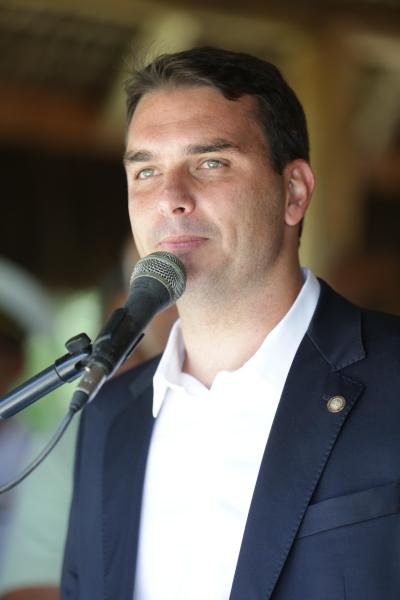
Bolsonaro in 2014

On 23 July, at the Social Christian Party (PSC) convention held at the Bangu Atlético Clube, Bolsonaro officially launched his candidacy for mayor of Rio de Janeiro. The event was attended by the party's national president, Pastor Everaldo, and his father, Congressman Jair Bolsonaro. In his speech, he stated, "Our candidacy is a protest against everything that exists today. Governing is about setting priorities. And the big question is what Rio de Janeiro will be like after the Olympics. Only an independent person, outside this corrupt old political scheme, will have the freedom to make real changes."

In the 2016 elections, he ran for mayor of Rio de Janeiro and finished in 4th place with 424,307 votes, representing 14% of the valid votes. He did not advance to the runoff, contested by Marcelo Crivella (PRB) and Marcelo Freixo (PSOL), but finished ahead of candidates such as congressmen Indio da Costa (PSD), Jandira Feghali (PCdoB), and Alessandro Molon (REDE), among four others. Despite the defeat, he succeeded in getting his brother, Carlos Bolsonaro, elected as the most voted city councilor in Rio de Janeiro. During the first mayoral debate hosted by Band, he fell ill and had to leave the event in the second segment. He reportedly refused medical assistance offered by then-Congresswoman Jandira Feghali.

In an April 2011 interview, while defending his father's positions, he argued they promoted "family" values and ethical principles. That same month, in an interview with O Estado de S. Paulo, he defended the Brazilian military dictatorship, claiming, "Back then there was security, quality healthcare and education, there was respect. Today, what rights do people have? Just to vote. And they still vote poorly." Additionally, Bolsonaro supports the death penalty for heinous crimes and lowering the age of criminal responsibility.

=== Senator for Rio de Janeiro (2019–present) ===
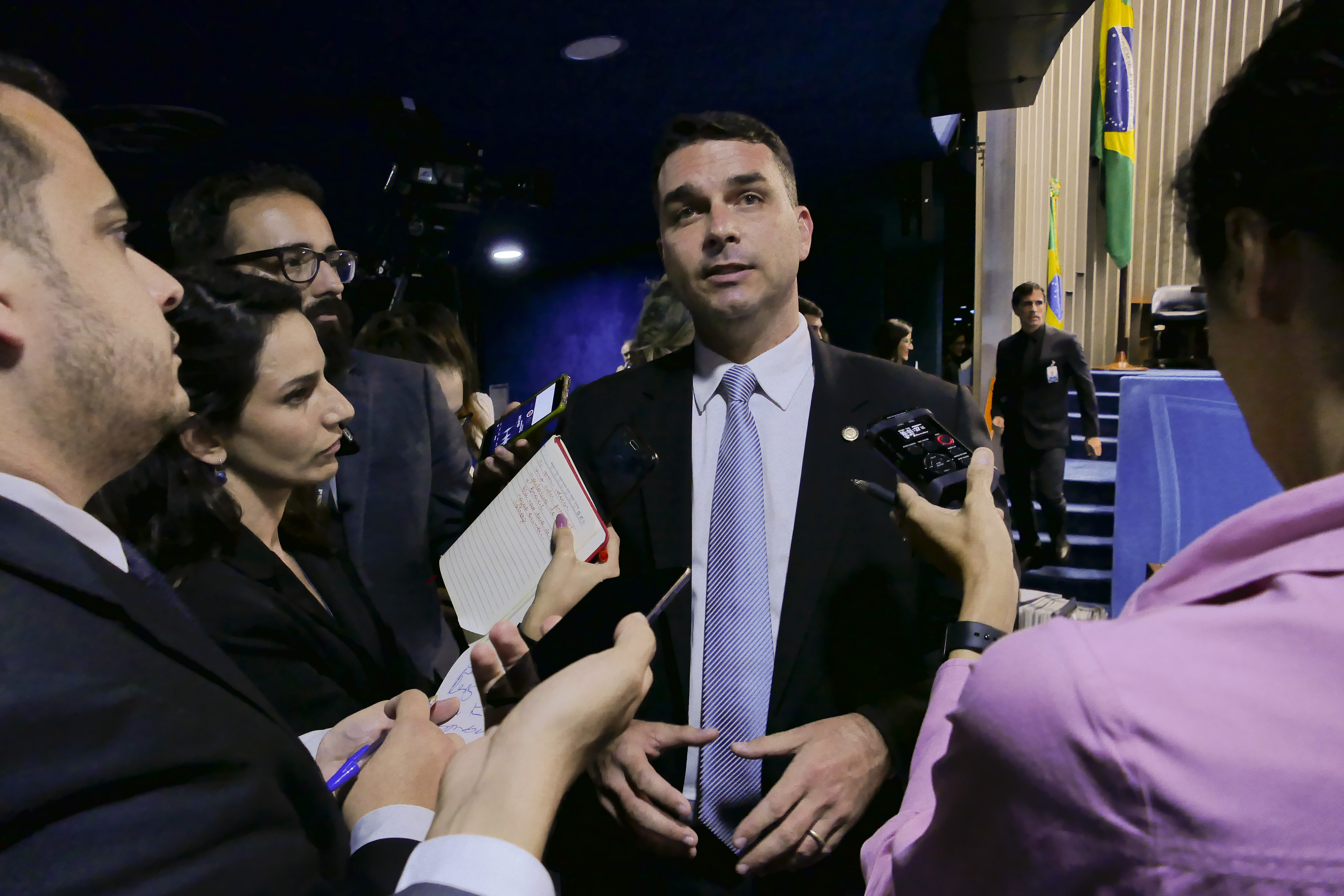
Bolsonaro giving an interview as a newly elected senator in 2018

In the 2018 elections, Bolsonaro ran for Senator from the state of Rio de Janeiro for the Social Liberal Party (PSL). The then state deputy's candidacy was announced at the PSL's national convention, held on 22 July 2018, in a convention center in Rio de Janeiro. At the same event, the Jair Bolsonaro 2018 presidential campaign was formalized.

In the election, Bolsonaro received 4,380,418 votes (31.36% of the total valid votes), being elected for the 56th legislature (2019–2027) of the Brazilian Federal Senate. On 6 February 2019, he was elected 3rd Secretary of the Senate's board of directors. On 11 June 2019, President Jair Bolsonaro awarded him the medal of the Order of Naval Merit during a ceremony commemorating the Battle of Riachuelo at the Brasília Marine Corps Group, located on the shores of Lake Paranoá.

== 2026 presidential campaign ==
Bolsonaro with President Donald Trump in May 2026

On 5 December 2025, Bolsonaro publicly announced his candidacy for president in the 2026 Brazilian general election, stating he had received the nomination from his father during a visit to the prison where the latter is being held at the Federal Police headquarters in Brasília. In a statement released on his social media, the senator declared: "It is with great responsibility that I confirm the decision of Brazil's greatest political and moral leader, Jair Messias Bolsonaro, to entrust me with the mission of continuing our national project."

The decision was communicated beforehand to the Liberal Party (PL) and the governor of São Paulo, Tarcísio de Freitas, who until then was the main candidate expected to be Jair Bolsonaro's choice in the elections, signaling that he would run for the presidency while Tarcísio is likely to focus on reelection. The announcement generated positive reactions among his allies, including federal congressman Eduardo Bolsonaro (PL), who expressed support for his brother, and the national president of the PL, Valdemar Costa Neto, who endorsed the choice.

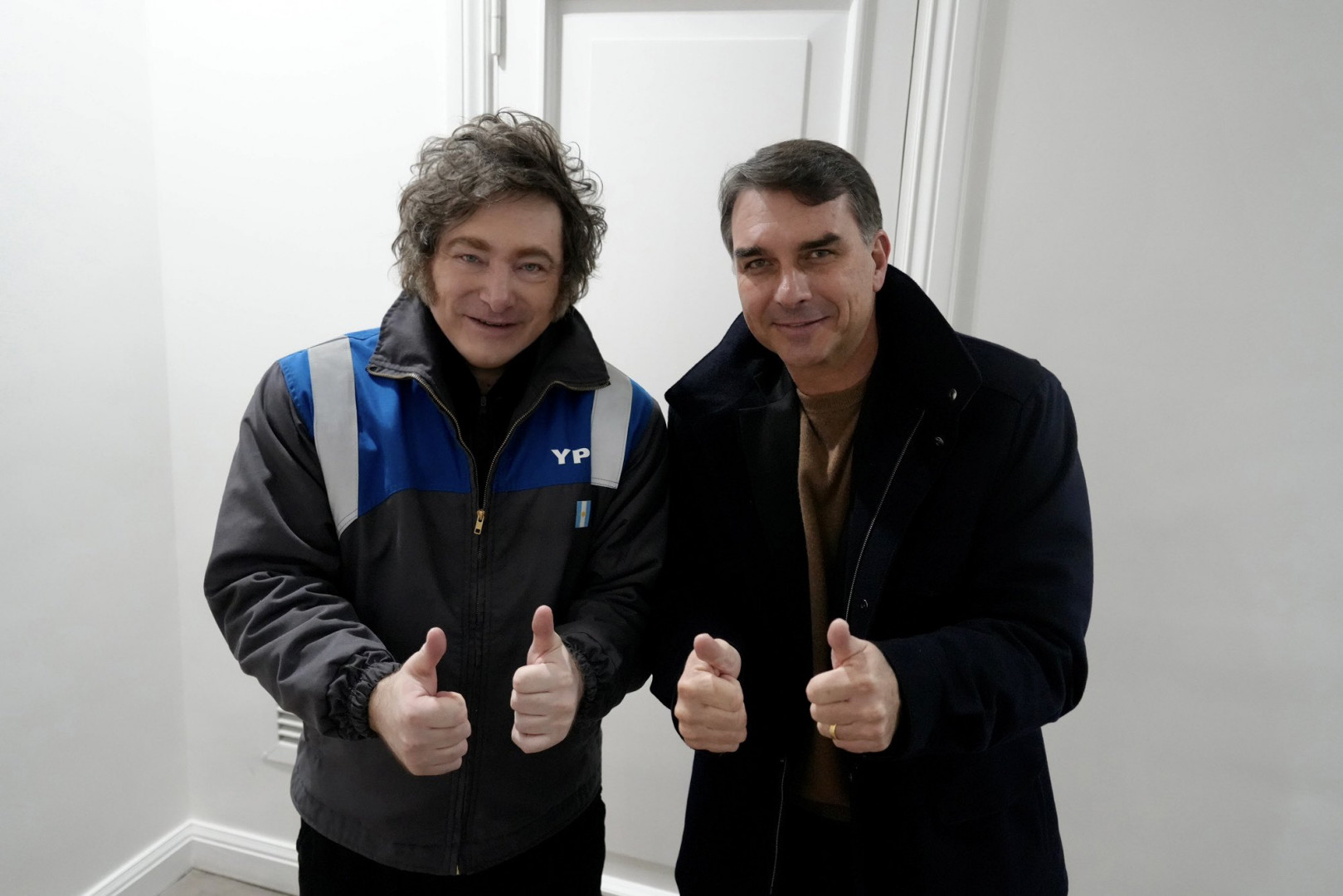
Bolsonaro with Argentinian president Javier Milei in June 2026

Bolsonaro's candidacy was supported internationally by Argentine President Javier Milei, Colombian President Abelardo de la Espriella, and American President Donald Trump.

According to sitting environment minister Marina Silva, think tank Chatham House, and others, a Bolsonaro victory would have put the Amazon rainforest at risk.

His presidential campaign placed particular emphasis on public security and crime policy. He was one of the two leading presidential candidates going into the first round of voting on 4 October. Shortly before the final debate hosted by TV Globo, he withdrew from it, citing a decision by a justice of the Superior Electoral Court that prohibited the placement of an empty lectern bearing Lula’s name.

Bolsonaro won a plurality of 47% of the vote over incumbent president Lula da Silva's 45% in the election on 4 October. He then lost the election in the following runoff vote on 25 October. Lula da Silva took 51.8% of the vote and Bolsonaro took 48.2%. Immediately following the vote, Bolsonaro refused to concede and said he would seek to have the vote annulled. However, he later conceded that Lula won the election.

After his loss, the Supreme Federal Court, as part of the investigation into Bolsonaro for alleged acts of corruption, money laundering, and currency evasion, ordered that he turn over his passports within 24 hours. Following this, Bolsonaro posted a video on Instagram stating that he had no intention to leave the country. However, he later fled the country with his wife and daughters, first to Argentina and then to the United States, heading to Florida. Bolsonaro fled with the assistance of former Mossad agent Menachem Booky Halevy and on a Baires Fly private jet, a company previously linked to a drug trafficking investigation. The Argentine government initially stated it had "no record of Flávio Bolsonaro entering" the country, but Argentina's immigration ministry admitted a day later to Bolsonaro and his family crossing a land border into Misiones Province and flying out towards Guayaquil in Ecuador.

On October 28, Bolsonaro landed at Miami–Opa Locka Executive Airport, and is expected to receive visas from the Department of State. After arriving in the US, Bolsonaro published a statement on his X account declaring himself the "true president of Brazil." The statement featured a modified version of the coat of arms, describing the country as "Estados Unidos do Brazil" (United States of Brazil). He later deleted the post and republished it with his title changed to "leader of Brazil."

=== Dark Horse financing controversy ===
During the campaign, Bolsonaro was associated with the film Dark Horse, a biographical film about his father Jair Bolsonaro starring Jim Caviezel and produced by Eduardo Verástegui, known for producing Sound of Freedom. Brazilian media described the film as propaganda for the campaign and as a platform for Bolsonarism.

In May 2026, Intercept Brasil reported that Bolsonaro had negotiated funding for Dark Horse with banker Daniel Vorcaro, the former head of Banco Master, who was under investigation in the Banco Master fraud case. According to the report, Bolsonaro sought up to R$134 million (2025) (US$23.96 million) for the film, and at least R$61 million was allegedly transferred between February and May 2025 through intermediary structures, including Entre Investimentos e Participações and the Texas-based Havengate Development Fund LP, which was described as linked to allies of his brother Eduardo Bolsonaro.

Bolsonaro initially denied the report, but later acknowledged having sought private sponsorship from Vorcaro for what he described as a private film about his father, while denying that he had offered advantages, received money or used public funds. The production company and Mário Frias denied that funds from Vorcaro or Banco Master had reached the production.

On 15 May 2026, further reporting based on contracts and messages stated that Eduardo Bolsonaro had served as an executive producer on the film with responsibilities for financing strategy, investor materials and fundraising, contradicting his earlier statement that he had merely licensed image rights for the project. Opposition lawmakers filed a criminal representation with the Prosecutor General's Office and the Federal Police requesting an investigation into Flávio Bolsonaro, Eduardo Bolsonaro, Jair Bolsonaro, Vorcaro and others over the alleged funding arrangements.

Supporters of Lula filed a complaint with the Superior Electoral Court seeking to block the film's release before the election; the court rejected the request, but distributors delayed the theatrical release until 2027, pending the investigations into the film's funding.

==== Relationship with Daniel Vorcaro ====
After the May 2026 audio recording in which Bolsonaro asked Vorcaro for R$134 million was revealed, further reports and documents were published about the two men's connection. According to the fact-checking organization Aos Fatos, by September 2026 Bolsonaro had lied at least 43 times about his links to Vorcaro.

===== Contacts in the days before Vorcaro's arrest =====
In the days before Vorcaro's first arrest on 17 November 2025, in the context of the Banco Master investigations, Bolsonaro made repeated attempts to contact the banker. Records extracted by the Federal Police from Vorcaro's phone and published by Estadão in September 2026 show text messages, unanswered calls and audio exchanges between the two over the four days preceding the police operation.

On 13 November 2025, Bolsonaro sent a message asking to speak by phone and asking whether Vorcaro could take a call; the banker replied that he would call back later, but no call is recorded that day. The next day the senator made an unanswered voice call, and the day after, when Vorcaro said he was unavailable, Bolsonaro again sought contact. On 16 November, the eve of the arrest, Bolsonaro tried again; Vorcaro said he was at church and would call later, and Bolsonaro then declared his support and said he needed guidance on decisions that had to be made.

In an audio message sent earlier, on 8 September 2025, Bolsonaro had described financial difficulties in maintaining contracts and professional commitments, mentioning the need for resources to keep the actors, directors and production teams of Dark Horse working. After hearing it, Vorcaro said he would try to arrange the requested payments. The two then held a WhatsApp call whose content investigators could not recover.

The exchanges took place as institutional pressure mounted on Banco Master; on 3 September 2025 the Central Bank of Brazil had rejected the acquisition of the institution by the Banco Regional de Brasília (BRB). Documents and notes on Vorcaro's phone indicated that he believed he was an imminent target of precautionary measures and was seeking ways to leave the country. Bolsonaro then indicated that his brother Eduardo could travel, offering to help arrange a meeting in the United Arab Emirates, where Vorcaro intended to try to sell Banco Master.

===== Alleged secret meeting =====
In December 2024, messages later incorporated into the Banco Master investigation recorded discussions about a possible meeting between Vorcaro, former president Jair Bolsonaro and senator Flávio Bolsonaro. The conversations took place between Vorcaro and the businessman Flávio Carneiro. In one message, Carneiro asked Vorcaro about his participation in a dinner with his "namesake" and "his father", which investigators associated with Flávio and Jair Bolsonaro respectively. After initially showing no knowledge of the matter, Vorcaro began to treat it reservedly and asked for discretion, writing: "Man. Don't tell anyone about this bolso meeting […] This thing destroys me." It is not clear from the messages whether the dinner actually took place.

===== Trip on Vorcaro's jet =====
On 23 September 2026, the magazine Piauí reported that on 19 January 2025 Bolsonaro had flown from Fort Lauderdale, Florida, to Brasília aboard a Legacy 650 executive jet (registration PP-NLR), in the company of his wife, two daughters and the lawyer and businessman Willer Tomaz de Souza. At the time, the aircraft was owned jointly through the company Fraction 024 Administração de Bem Próprio S.A., divided into three equal shares: one held by Willer Tomaz, one by the businessman Laércio Cosentino, founder of TOTVS, and a third acquired in late 2024 by Prime You, a company of which Vorcaro was a partner. Prime You also operated the aircraft through Prime Aviation Táxi Aéreo e Serviços.

The trip took place during the negotiation of the Dark Horse financing. The investment schedule called for a payment on 20 January 2025, the day after Bolsonaro's return to Brazil; that day the senator contacted Thiago Miranda, identified as an intermediary in the negotiations, asking for speed in the legal review of the investment. Messages later revealed indicate that Vorcaro pressured the people responsible for the transfers, which ran behind schedule, and the first installment was only transferred in February 2025. The same aircraft was later identified as the one used in the travels of Supreme Court minister Alexandre de Moraes, whom Bolsonaro had frequently criticized for using the jet before his own trip was reported.

== Electoral history ==
Year	Election	Party	Office	Coalition	Partners	Party	Votes	Percent	Result
2002	State Elections of Rio de Janeiro	PP	State Deputy	—N/a			31,293	0.39%	Elected
2006	State Elections of Rio de Janeiro	PP	State Deputy	—N/a			43,099	0.53%	Elected
2010	State Elections of Rio de Janeiro	PP	State Deputy	—N/a			58,322	0.78%	Elected
2014	State Elections of Rio de Janeiro	PP	State Deputy	—N/a			160,359	2.07%	Elected
2016	Municipal Election of Rio de Janeiro	PSC	Mayor	Rio Needs Strength to Change (PSC, PRP)	Rodrigo Amorim	PRP	424,307	14.00%	Not elected
2018	State Elections of Rio de Janeiro	PSL	Senator	—N/a	Paulo Marinho	PSL	4,380,418	31.36%	Elected
2018	State Elections of Rio de Janeiro	PSL	Senator	—N/a	Leonardo Rodrigues	PSL	4,380,418	31.36%	Elected
2026	Presidential Election	PL	President	—N/a	Alfredo Gaspar	PL	56,104,503	47.03%	Runoff
2026	Presidential Election	PL	President	—N/a	Alfredo Gaspar	PL	59,826,041	48.21%	Not elected

Party political offices
Preceded by Filipe Pereira (2008)	PSC nominee for Mayor of Rio de Janeiro; 2016	Party extinct
Preceded by Jair Bolsonaro	PL nominee for President of Brazil; 2026	Most recent
