= Patriota =

Patriot Patriota
- President: Adilson Barroso
- Founded: 9 August 2011 (as the National Ecological Party)
- Dissolved: 9 November 2023
- Merged into: Democratic Renewal Party
- Headquarters: Brasília, Federal District
- Membership (2023): 322,097
- Ideology: National conservatism Christian right Economic liberalism Green conservatism Anti-communism
- Political position: Right-wing to far-right Historical; Centre-right
- Religion: Christianity
- Colours: Dark green
- Slogan: "For a patriotic Brazil"
- TSE Identification Number: 51

Website
- patriota51.org.br

Patriota (Portuguese pronunciation: [patɾiotɐ], lit. 'Patriot'), abbreviated PATRI and formerly known as the National Ecological Party (Portuguese: Partido Ecológico Nacional, abbreviated PEN), was a right-wing to far-right political party in Brazil. It was registered in the Superior Electoral Court in the summer of 2012. The last president of the party was the former state deputy of São Paulo Adilson Barroso, who before creating PEN was a member of the Social Christian Party. The party's Superior Electoral Court identification number was 51.

Its platform involved support for conservative policies, a strong national military policy, zero tolerance politics regarding violence and crime, support for the Brazilian agrarian sector, and rejection of social and indigenous movements like the Landless Workers' Movement as well as an anti-communist stance. It stated it is against corruption in Brazil, and seeks to uphold traditional values based on Christian ethics. The party had links with the Assemblies of God, the largest Christian evangelical denomination in Brazil.

After the 2022 Brazilian general elections, Patriota failed to break through the electoral threshold, thus cutting access to party subsidies and free political advertisement. Thus, in November 2023 it merged with the Brazilian Labour Party to form the Democratic Renewal Party.

== History ==
The party was founded as the National Ecological Party (PEN) in 2011. The party was a centre-right green conservative party, originally meant to attract environmentalist politician Marina Silva in case her party did not get the authorization to take part in the 2014 Brazilian general election. This proposal failed and the party obtained a small quantity of votes in the 2014 elections, while endorsing then presidential candidate Aécio Neves.

=== 2017–2023 ===
In 2017, the PEN changed when Jair Bolsonaro announced he would enter the party, in a bid to run for President of Brazil in the 2018 Brazilian general election. PEN changed its name to Patriota (PATRI) and abandoned its former environmentalist ideals to become a right-wing conservative party pursuing a right-wing populist agenda, influenced by Donald Trump's victory in the 2016 United States presidential election and Brexit. Patriota has renounced its green and pro-ecologist policies in favor of its conservative and nationalist policies; it has maintained and strengthened its religious opposition to abortion, same-sex marriage, and other socially progressive policies.

The acronym PEN was also seen as an abbreviation of Pentecostalism, the evangelical current of PEN founders, than a coherent ideological current. Since the refoundation as Patriota, the party are making more efforts to appeal for a broader Christian electorate, like socially conservative Catholics and traditional Protestants like Baptists and Presbyterians, instead to be a mere political arm of a single church. Not only the acronym was changed, but the ideology was changed too, due to the fact that Bolsonaro sees environmentalists as part of a "conspiracy against Brazil" while his sons Eduardo Bolsonaro and Flávio Bolsonaro are global warming deniers. These two reasons forced the party to change its name and ideology.

After an internal conflict, Bolsonaro gave up on joining Patriota in January 2018 and chose to join the Social Liberal Party in January 2018. Nevertheless, the party maintained the proposal of change of name and statute and the party have spoken in the possibility of two other members of the party applying for the candidacy to the presidency of the republic, these include Adilson Barroso himself and the plastic surgeon Dr. Roberto M. Rey Jr., affiliated to the party since 2014.

In 2018, Patriota launched former firefighter and evangelical pastor Cabo Daciolo as their presidential nominee, without partnering any political party. Daciolo is known for his controversial political views, which include turning Brazil into a Christian theocracy. Daciolo got 1,3% of votes and did not endorse Bolsonaro nor Haddad in the second round.

On 17 December 2018, the Progressive Republican Party merged with Patriota, increasing its representation to nine deputies and one senator. Patriota later joined Bolsonaro's coalition in the Congress.

With the 2022 Brazilian general elections, Patriota failed to break through the electoral threshold, thus cutting access to party subsidies and free political advertisement. On October, the party voted in an assembly to merge with the Brazilian Labour Party to form the "Mais Brasil" party. The merger was approved by the Superior Electoral Court on 9 November 2023 and the party is now called the Democratic Renewal Party.

== Ideology and policies ==
=== Religious policies ===
Due to most members and militants of Patriota being from different Christian branches and racial backgrounds, the party condemned racism and promotes Christian ecumenism, despite this, the party opposes integration with non-Christians, mainly Atheists and Muslims. The party followed a deep conservative and fundamentalist orientation, being against secularism, abortion, same-sex marriage, LGBT adoption and pro-gender identity policies while referring to it as "gender ideology". But ever since, the party had adopted more controversial stances, including turning Brazil into a theocratic state and replacing the secular 1988 constitution for a religious-oriented one.

=== Economic policies ===
The party had ambiguous economic policies. While embracing economic liberalism, the party opposes foreign interference, mainly by Chinese companies, in the Brazilian economy. The party supported the privatization of most Brazilian state-owned companies, but also promoted more Brazilian government interference in some sectors, like the mining sector, and opposes the privatization of Petrobras. The party's economic policy could have been seen as supporting a mixed economy.

=== National security policies ===
Patriota supported a hard approach against crime and drug trafficking, supporting the lowering of the minimum penal age and favoring life imprisonment and capital punishment. The party also supported liberal gun policies, favoring the open carry of weapons and favors large investments on the Brazilian Armed Forces.

== Electoral results ==
=== Presidential elections ===
Election	Candidate	Running mate	Coalition	First round		Second round		Result
Election	Candidate	Running mate	Coalition	Votes	%	Votes	%	Result
2014	Aécio Neves (PSDB)	Aloysio Nunes (PSDB)	Change Brazil (PSDB, DEM, PMN, PEN, PTB, PTC, PTdoB, PTN, SD)	34,897,211	33.55% (2nd)	51,041,155	48.36% (2nd)	Lost ✗
2018	Cabo Daciolo (PATRI)	Suelene Balduino (PATRI)	None	1,348,323	1.26% (6th)	—		Lost ✗

=== Legislative elections ===
Election	Chamber of Deputies				Federal Senate			
Election	Votes	%	Seats	+/–	Votes	%	Seats	+/–
2014	667,983	0.69%	2 / 513	New	65,597	0.07%	0 / 81	New
2018	1,432,304	1.46%	5 / 513	▲3	60,589	0.04%	0 / 81	0
2022	1,526,570	1.40%	4 / 513	▼1	76,729	0.08%	0 / 81	0

== See also ==
- Evangelical political parties in Latin America
