= Baires Fly =

Airline in Argentina

Baires Fly S.A.
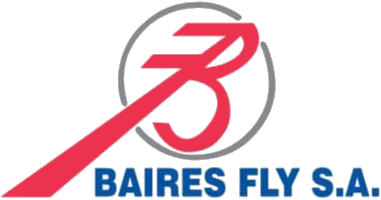

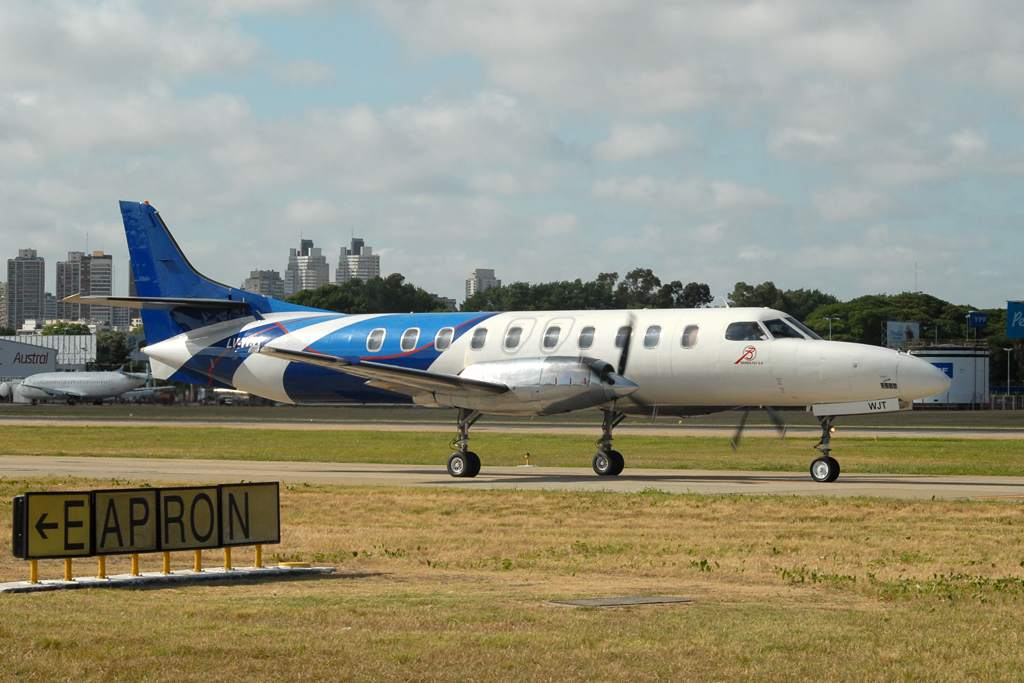
- Swearingen Metroliner operated by Baires Fly
- Commenced operations: May 1996; 30 years ago
- Fleet size: 10
- Headquarters: Buenos Aires, Argentina
- Key people: Luis Grande, owner

Baires Fly S.A. is an airline based in Buenos Aires, Argentina. It was established on May 30, 1996, and operates passenger and cargo charter services. Its main base is Aeroparque Jorge Newbery in Buenos Aires. Baires Fly was widely reported to be used in Flávio Bolsonaro's flight from Brazil shortly after his loss in the 2026 Brazilian general election.

== Fleet ==
The Baires Fly fleet consists of the following aircraft (at September 2020):

- 2 Bombardier Learjet 35
- 4 Bombardier Learjet 60
- 2 Fairchild Metro III
- 1 Gulfstream V
- 1 Gulfstream G400

=== Former fleet ===
- 3 Bombardier Learjet 45
