= Valéria Bolsonaro =

Brazilian politician (born 1969)

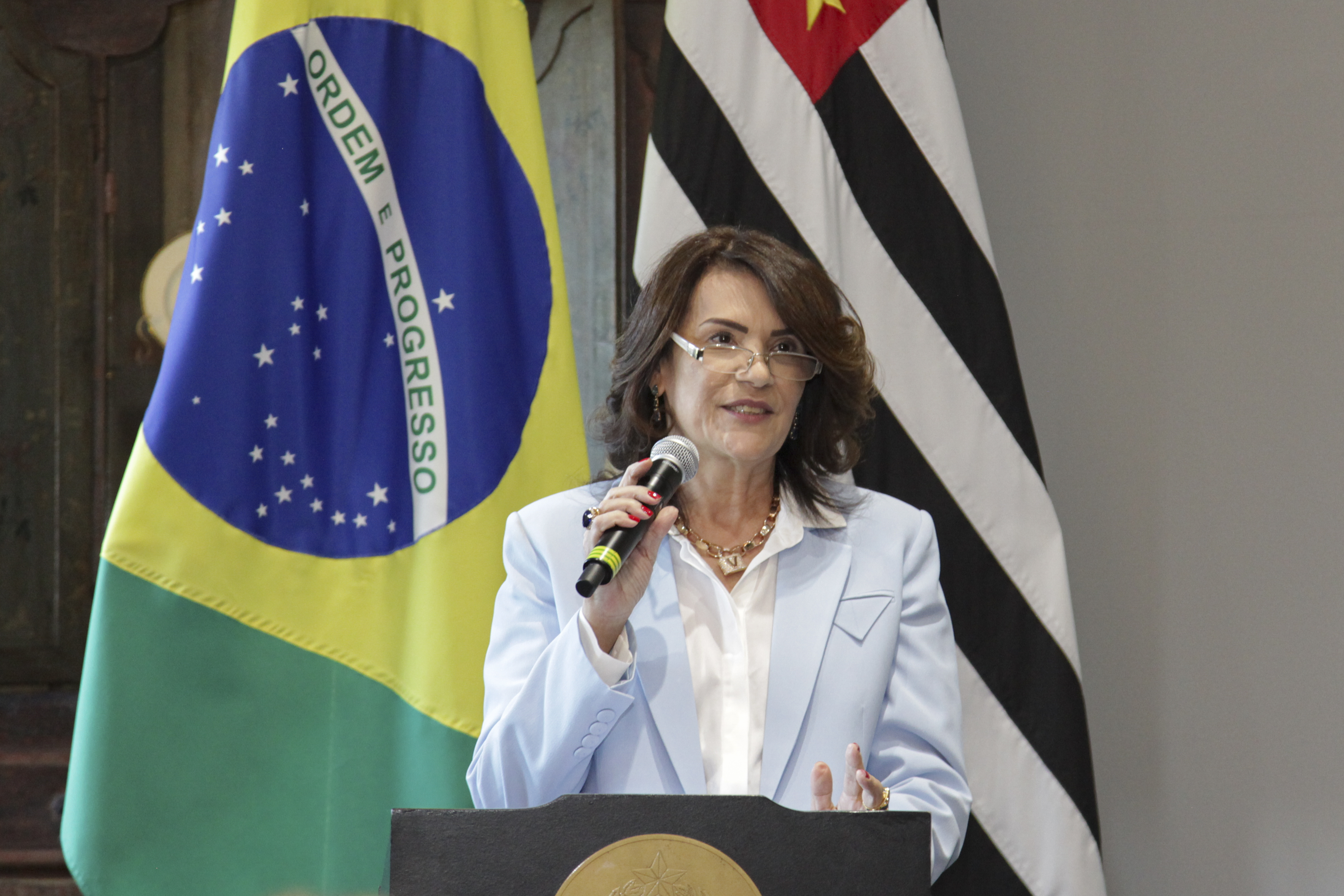
- Swearing in ceremony of Bolsonaro as State Secretary for Women in 2024.

State Secretary of Public Policy for Women of São Paulo
- Incumbent
- Assumed office 6 May 2024
- Governor: Tarcísio de Freitas
- Preceded by: Sonaira Fernandes

State Deputy of São Paulo
- Incumbent
- Assumed office 15 March 2019
- Constituency: At-large

Personal details
- Born: Valeria Muller Ramos; 16 September 1969 (age 57) Santos, São Paulo, Brazil
- Party: PL (since 2022)
- Other political affiliations: PSC (2016–2018); PSL (2018–2020); PRTB (2021–2022)
- Profession: Teacher, biologist

Valeria Muller Ramos Bolsonaro (née Muller Ramos; born in Santos on September 16, 1969) is a biologist, teacher and Brazilian deputy at the state of São Paulo. She is affiliated to Partido Liberal. She was elected in 2018. She is an ally of Conservative president Jair Bolsonaro. She married his second cousin, leading her to adopt the surname.
