= Everaldo Pereira =

Brazilian pastor and politician

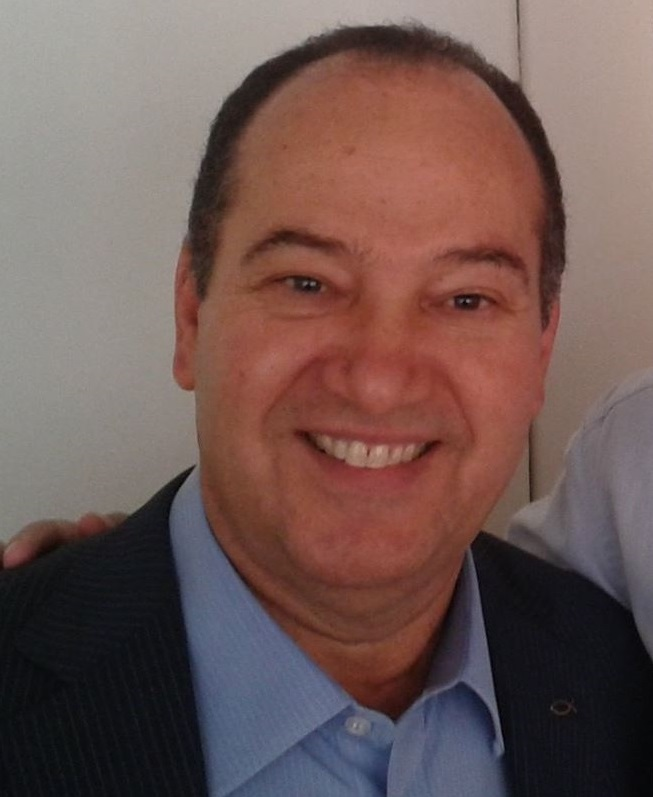

National vice-president of Podemos
- Incumbent
- Assumed office 15 June 2023

National President of PSC
- In office 17 June 2015 – 15 June 2023
- Preceded by: Vitor Nosseis

State Subchief of Staff of Rio de Janeiro
- In office 1 January 1999 – 1 January 2003
- Governor: Anthony Garotinho

Personal details
- Born: Everaldo Dias Pereira; 22 February 1956 (age 69) Rio de Janeiro, RJ, Brazil
- Party: PSC (2003–2023); Podemos (2023–present)
- Spouse(s): Maeli de Almeida (m. 2003; div. 2011) Ester Batista (m. 2013)
- Parents: Heraldo Pereira (father); Dilma Dias (mother)
- Occupation: Evangelic Minister, politician, businessman

Everaldo Dias Pereira (born 22 February 1956), better known as Pastor Everaldo, is a Brazilian pastor, businessman and politician affiliated with Podemos. He is a pastor in the Assembly of God church and has been the national president of the Social Christian Party (PSC) until its merger with Podemos in 2023. He was the PSC's candidate for President of Brazil in the 2014 election, in which he placed fifth, with 0.75 percent of the total votes.

== Biography ==
Pereira is the son of pastor Heraldo and missionary Dilma and was born in Acari, a poor neighborhood in the North Zone of Rio de Janeiro. His parents gave him the same name as his uncle. The family residence was the location of the Assembly of God Madureira Ministry. He has five siblings: Meirelaine, Ivete, Edivaldo, Edmilson and Marcos.

Pereira learned to work early. At age six, he was already helping his father sell plant pots at fairs. At ten, he made friends with marketers and started selling bananas, mugs and cups. He also became a bricklayer and an office errand boy.

When Pereira was 14, he was approved in a public tender and accepted into the Reinsurance Institute of Brazil (IRB). At 17 years old, he joined the Economy and Finances College of Rio de Janeiro and paid for his studies with the salary received from his work at the institute. Later, he created his own company. By the 1989 election, he had become an active supporter of presidential candidate Leonel Brizola and a public figure.

Pereira's second wife is gospel singer Ester Batista, and he is a father to three children. He was previously married to Maeli de Almeida. Between the two marriages, he was in a relationship with Kátia Miriam Offredi Maia, who accused him of physical aggression, followed by death threats. Kátia Miriam claimed she was in a stable union with Pereira.

== Political career ==
Pereira kept himself in the political background until the electoral success of Anthony Garotinho (PR, former PDT) and Benedita da Silva (PT) when they ran for Governor and Vice-Governor, respectively, of the state of Rio de Janeiro. Both politicians were evangelicals. They had the support of former federal deputy bishop Manoel Ferreira (PSC), leader of Pereira's church. From 1999 to 2003, Pereira was selected to be the assistant chief of staff of the state government. He was responsible for the implementation of the first "Bolsa Família" of Brazil: "Cheque-Cidadão". In 2003, he joined the Social Christian Party as vice-president. After more than a decade, he decided to run for public office for the first time.

In 2016 he baptized the future Brazilian president Jair Bolsonaro in the Jordan River. Bolsonaro declared himself to be a Catholic, although he attended the Baptist church for 10 years.

== Critics and controversies ==
Pastor Pereira was considered a "public enemy" by LGBT activists for being one of the advocates of the campaign "Man + Woman = Family", which was promoted by the PSC in 2012. He also received criticism from defenders of LGBT rights after declaring in his 2014 bid for the presidency that, if elected, he would propose a law to the National Congress to revert the decision of the Supreme Federal Court (STF) recognizing same-sex marriage in Brazil. The pastor also drew flak from sectors linked to women's rights for opposing abortion rights. During the presidential campaign, Pereira also positioned himself against proposals of drug legalization and assumed the image of a defender of the traditional family, arguing that it is mandated by the Constitution.

In 2012, he was convicted and ordered to pay his ex-wife, Katia Maia, an indemnity of R$ 85,000 (US$ 26,350) for material and moral damage. Pastor Everaldo asked the Justice Court of Rio de Janeiro (TJ-RJ) to overturn the decision and was acquitted by the Supreme Federal Court. In 2013, Pereira's ex-wife initiated in the Superior Court of Justice (STJ) a new judicial process, alleging that the pastor committed physical violence, followed by death threats. Katia Maia said that during the aggression there were "kicks and punches, that caused a puncture in [her] eardrum". Pereira, however, said he acted in legitimate self-defense after a car pursuit in the streets of Rio de Janeiro.

In August 2016, Pereira was also accused of threatening a young woman who claimed to have been attacked and sexually harassed by federal deputy Pastor Marco Feliciano, one of the most prominent names of the PSC, the party Pereira presided over. The threat allegedly happened after the woman refused to accept hush money.

In January 2017, it was revealed that, during the 2012 municipal elections, Pereira asked for money from former federal deputy and President of the Chamber Eduardo Cunha.

In 2020, he was arrested by Operation Tris in Idem, conducted by Federal Police to investigate corruption in Rio de Janeiro State's health secretary.

== See also ==
- Conservatism
- 2014 Brazilian general election
- Social Christian Party

Party political offices
Preceded by Sérgio Bueno	Social Christian Party nominee for President of Brazil; 2014	Most recent
Preceded by Vitor Nosseis	National President of the PSC; 2015–2023	Succeeded by Party dissolved
