= Rogéria Bolsonaro =

Brazilian politician (born 1960)

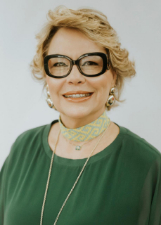

Councillor of Rio de Janeiro
- In office 1 January 1993 – 1 January 2001
- Constituency: At-large

Personal details
- Born: Rogéria Nantes Braga; 3 May 1960 (age 66) Magé, Rio de Janeiro, Brazil
- Party: PDS (1992); PPB (1996); PMDB (2000); PSL (2018–2020); Republicans (2020–2022); PL (2022–present)
- Spouse: Jair Bolsonaro (m. 1978; div. 1997)
- Children: Flávio; Carlos; Eduardo
- Education: Veiga de Almeida University
- Occupation: Politician
- Profession: Advertising professional

Rogéria Nantes Braga Bolsonaro (born 3 May 1960) is a Brazilian politician who served as a city councillor in Rio de Janeiro for two terms. She is also known as the first wife of former president Jair Bolsonaro, with whom she had three sons: Flávio, Carlos and Eduardo.

== Early life and education ==
Rogéria Nantes Braga was born on 3 May 1960 in Brazil.

She holds a degree in Advertising and Marketing from Universidade Veiga de Almeida (2003) and a postgraduate degree in communication, Marketing and Business Administration.

She was married to Jair Bolsonaro until the late 1990s. The couple separated in 1997, with the divorce formalized in 1999.

In 2018, during the presidential campaign, she publicly defended her former husband following media reports about his personal life.

== Political career ==
Bolsonaro was elected as a city councillor in Rio de Janeiro in 1992 for the Democratic Social Party (PDS), receiving 7,924 votes.

She was re-elected in 1996 for Progressistas, with 24,891 votes.

In 2000, already affiliated with the Brazilian Democratic Movement (MDB), she ran for re-election and received 5,109 votes, failing to be elected.

Throughout her career, she also held positions in state and municipal public bodies, including roles in the vice-governor's office of the state of Rio de Janeiro and in parliamentary offices.

Eighteen years later, in 2018, she joined the PSL.

In 2020, as a member of Republicans, she ran again for city councillor in Rio de Janeiro, receiving around 2,000 votes and was not elected.

In 2022, she joined the Liberal Party (PL).

In 2026, she was announced as a pre-candidate for the Federal Senate representing the state of Rio de Janeiro.

== Personal life ==
Rogéria Bolsonaro had three sons with Jair Bolsonaro: Flávio Bolsonaro, Carlos Bolsonaro and Eduardo Bolsonaro.

=== 2025 robbery ===
In August 2025, Rogéria Bolsonaro and her parents were held hostage during a robbery at her residence in Resende, in Rio de Janeiro state. According to reports, criminals invaded the property and held the victims under threat while demanding money.The victims were not seriously injured, and the suspects took personal belongings and a vehicle that was later recovered.

=== CPF suspension ===
In 2025, Rogéria Bolsonaro stated that her taxpayer registry number (CPF) had been wrongly suspended, according to statements to the press.

=== Controversies ===
Between 2020 and 2022, media reports indicated that Rogéria Bolsonaro was among members of the Bolsonaro family who purchased real estate using cash payments.

According to a survey published by Época magazine and reported by other outlets, she allegedly acquired 14 properties by 2008, five of which were paid in cash.

== Electoral history ==
Year	Election	Party	Office	Votes	Result	Ref.
1992	Municipal	Democratic Social Party	City Councillor	7,924	Elected	
1996	Municipal	Progressistas	City Councillor	24,891	Elected	
2000	Municipal	Brazilian Democratic Movement	City Councillor	5,109	Not elected	
2020	Municipal	Republicans	City Councillor	2,034	Not elected	
