= Pedro Paulo (politician) =

Brazilian politician (born 1972)

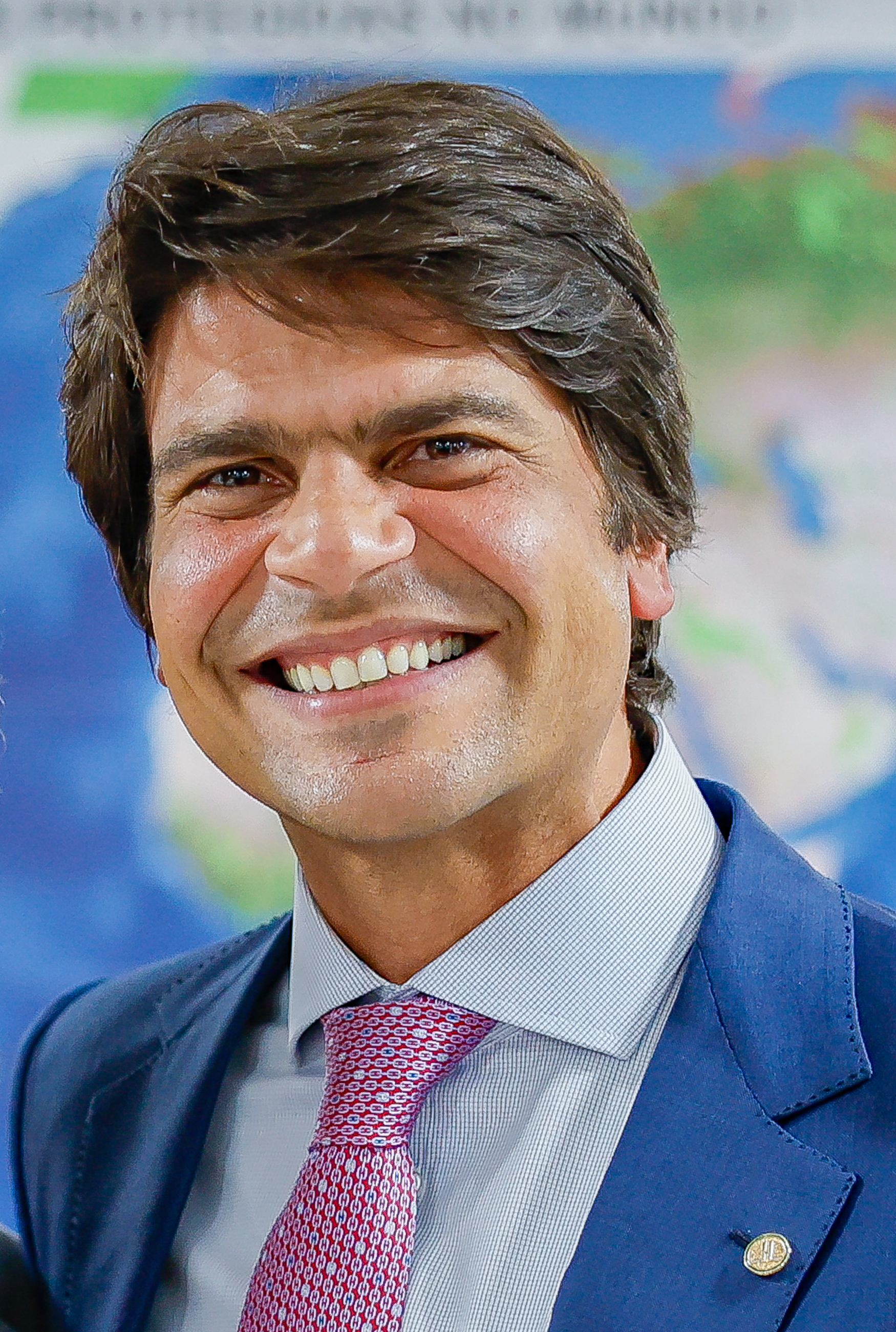
- Paulo in 2024

Member of the Chamber of Deputies
- Incumbent
- Assumed office 1 February 2011
- Constituency: Rio de Janeiro

Personal details
- Born: 29 June 1972 (age 54)
- Party: Social Democratic Party (since 2022)

Pedro Paulo Carvalho Teixeira (born 29 June 1972) is a Brazilian politician serving as a member of the Chamber of Deputies since 2011. From 2007 to 2011, he was a member of the Legislative Assembly of Rio de Janeiro.
