= Carlos Bolsonaro =

Brazilian politician

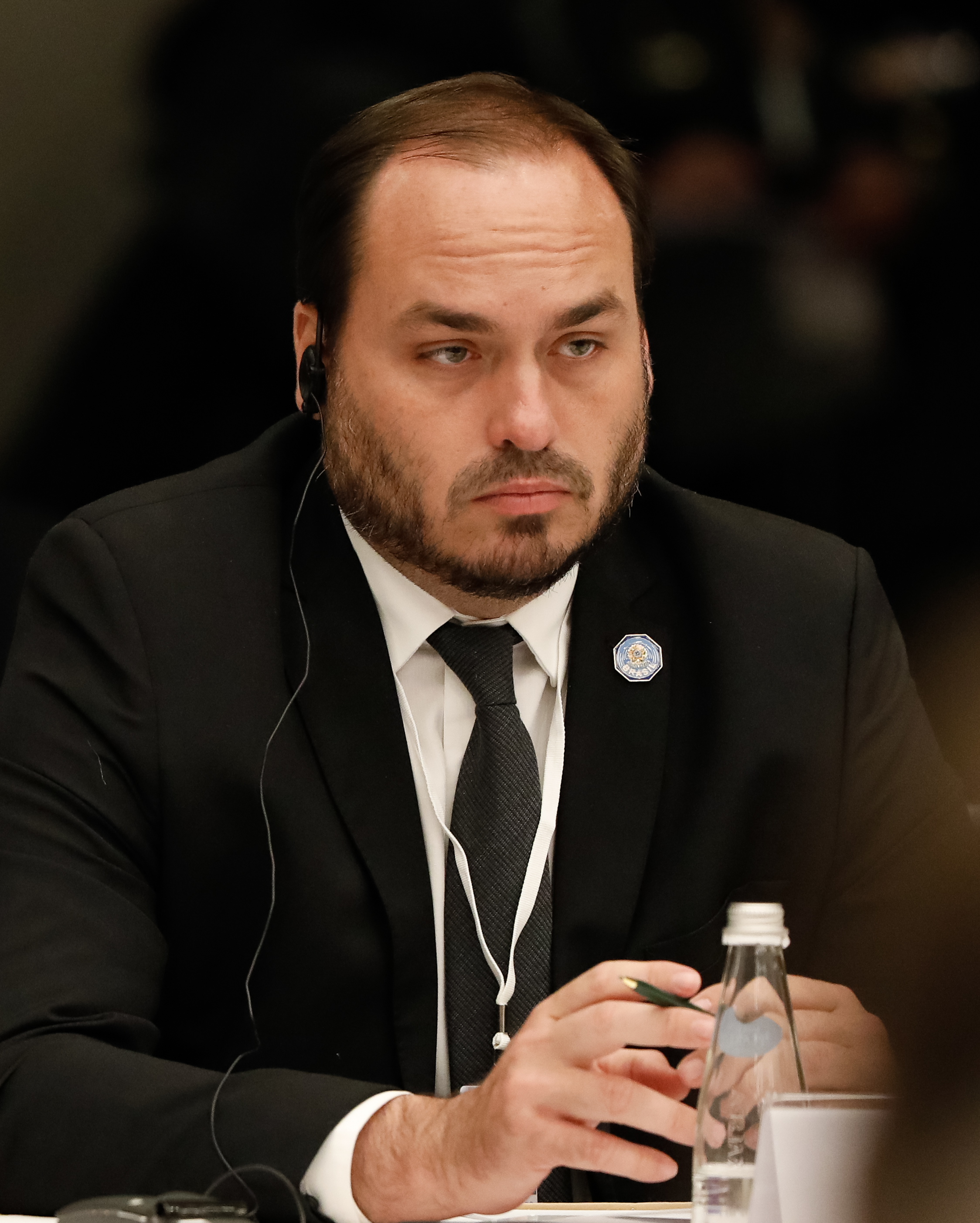
- Bolsonaro in 2022

Senator-elect for Santa Catarina
- Assuming office 1 February 2027

Councillor of Rio de Janeiro
- In office 1 January 2001 – 15 December 2025
- Constituency: At-large

Personal details
- Born: Carlos Nantes Bolsonaro; 7 December 1982 (age 43) Resende, Rio de Janeiro, Brazil
- Party: PL (2024–present)
- Other political affiliations: PP (2000–2003); PTB (2003–2005); DEM (2005); PP (2005–2016); PSC (2016–2020); Republicanos (2020–2024)
- Children: 1
- Parents: Jair Bolsonaro (father); Rogéria Nantes Braga (mother)
- Relatives: Flavio and Eduardo Bolsonaro (brothers); Jair Renan Bolsonaro (half-brother); Michelle Bolsonaro (stepmother)
- Education: Universidade Estácio de Sá
- Occupation: Politician
- Website: www.bolsonarocarlos.com.br

Carlos Nantes Bolsonaro (born 7 December 1982), is a Brazilian politician who is the second son of the 38th President of Brazil, Jair Bolsonaro.

== Background ==
Bolsonaro was born on 7 December 1982 in Resende, at the Agulhas Negras Military Academy. However, he did not study at the military schools there because he alleged that high-ranking officers blocked his siblings' access to the Armed Forces schools in a reprisal against his father. After finishing his education there, he first started studying law for six months but eventually dropped out in order to pursue aeronaturical science.

He graduated in Aeronautical Science from Estácio de Sá University and has been a member of the Municipal Chamber of Rio de Janeiro since 2001, being affiliated to the Republicans.

His brothers are Flávio Bolsonaro, a member of the Legislative Assembly of Rio de Janeiro from 2003 until 2019 and current member of the Federal Senate of Brazil who was defeated by Luiz Inácio Lula da Silva in the 2026 presidential election, and Eduardo Bolsonaro, a member of the Chamber of Deputies from 2015 to 2025 who lives as a fugitive from justice in the United States to avoid punishment after being sentenced to prison for obstruction of justice.

== Politics ==
In 2000, Carlos Bolsonaro was the youngest councillor elected in Brazil's history, having received 16,053 votes. In 2016, he was re-elected to a fifth term, being the most voted councillor of Rio de Janeiro with 106,657 votes.

Carlos is credited with having created and coordinated a "hate cabinet", a virtual militia designed to create and spread through social media malicious content in support of his father.

== Personal life ==
In 2023, it was reported that Carlos is in a relationship with the economist and representative of Brazil at the Inter-American Development Bank (IDB), Martha Seillier. Their first daughter, named Júlia, was born on 13 February 2023. She is the fourth granddaughter of the former President of Brazil, Jair Bolsonaro.

== Electoral history ==
=== Municipal Chamber of Rio de Janeiro ===
Election
Election	Party	Votes	%	Position in Rio de Janeiro Municipality	Result
2024	PL	130,480	4.30	No. 1	Elected
2020	Republicans	71,000	2.69	No. 2	Elected
2016	PSC	106,657	3.65	No. 1	Elected
2012	PSC	23,679	0.76	No. 20	Elected
2008	PP	28,209	0.71	No. 12	Elected
2004	PTB	22,355	0.66	No. 29	Elected
2000	PPB	16,053	0.50	No. 29	Elected
