= Hugo Leal (politician) =

Brazilian politician (born 1962)

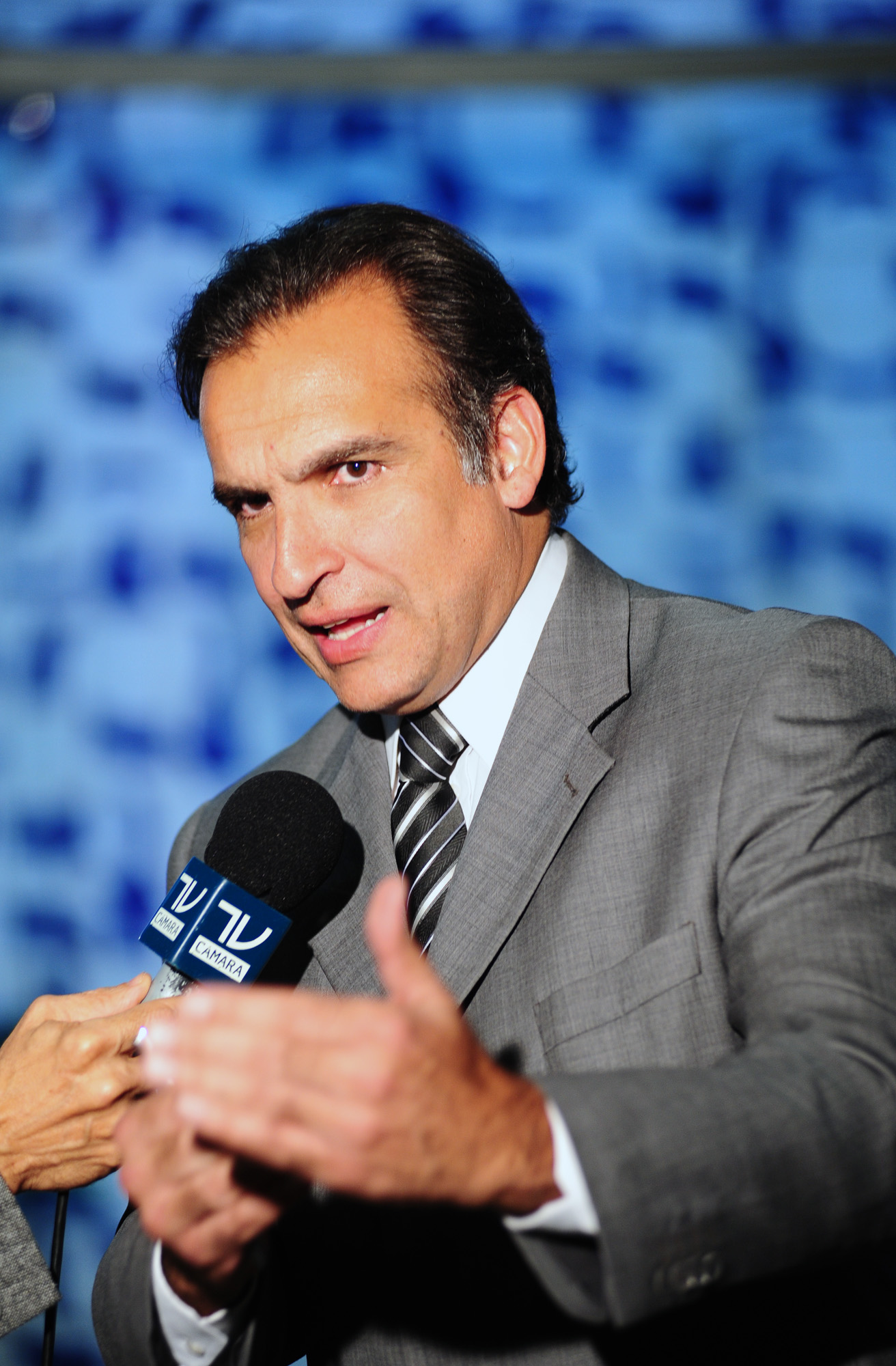
- Leal in 2010

Federal Deputy for Rio de Janeiro
- Incumbent
- Assumed office 1 February 2007

State Deputy for Rio de Janeiro
- In office 1 February 1999 – 31 January 2006

Personal details
- Born: 6 August 1962 (age 64) Ouro Fino, Minas Gerais, Brazil
- Party: PSD (2018–); PSB (2016–2018); PROS (2013–2016); PSC (2003–2013); PSB (2001–2003); PTD (1988–2001)

Hugo Leal Melo da Silva (born 6 August 1962) more commonly known as Hugo Leal is a Brazilian politician as well as a syndicalist and trade union president. Although born in Minas Gerais, he has spent his political career representing Rio de Janeiro, having served as federal deputy representative since 2007.

== Personal life ==
Leal is the son of Leal Pereira da Silva e Vicentina de Paula Pereira da Silva. Prior to entering politics he was lawyer and real estate brooker. Leal is a Roman Catholic and member of a Catholic Parliamentary Front which campaigns against abortion on other issues.

== Political career ==
Leal voted in favor of the impeachment motion of then-president Dilma Rousseff. He would later vote against opening a similar corruption investigation against Rousseff's successor Michel Temer, and voted in favor of the 2017 Brazilian labor reforms.

Despite his religion Leal has often campaigned with the evangelical parliamentary group on issues the two agree on. Leal is a strong supporter of limiting government involvement and regulations in the economy.
