= Jandira Feghali =

Brazilian politician (born 1957)

- Feghali in 2016

Member of the Chamber of Deputies
- Incumbent
- Assumed office 1 January 2011
- Constituency: Rio de Janeiro
- In office 1 February 1991 – 1 February 2007
- Constituency: Rio de Janeiro

Member of the Legislative Assembly of Rio de Janeiro
- In office 1 January 1987 – 31 December 1990
- Constituency: At-large

Personal details
- Born: 17 May 1957 (age 69) Curitiba, Paraná, Brazil
- Party: PCdoB (1981–present)
- Relatives: Jeanette Feghali (aunt)
- Education: Rio de Janeiro State University
- Profession: Physician, trade unionist

Jandira Feghali (born 17 May 1957) is a physician, trade unionist and politician member of the Communist Party of Brazil (PCdoB).

== Background ==
She is sister of the piano and keyboard player Ricardo Feghali, member of the Brazilian band Roupa Nova. Jandira is mother of two children. Her family is of Lebanese descent, and her paternal aunt was the Lebanese singer Sabah (birth name Jeanette Gergis Feghali). In 2019, she was appointed to lead the minority in the House of Representatives.

Party political offices
New political party	PCdoB nominee for Mayor of Rio de Janeiro; 2004, 2008, 2016	Most recent
