= Jair Renan Bolsonaro =

Brazilian politician (born 1998)

- Jair Renan in 2021

Member-elect of the Chamber of Deputies
- Assuming office 1 February 2027
- Constituency: Santa Catarina

Member of the Municipal Chamber of Balneário Camboriú
- Incumbent
- Assumed office 1 January 2025
- Constituency: At-large

Personal details
- Born: Jair Renan Valle Bolsonaro; 10 April 1998 (age 28) Rio de Janeiro, Brazil
- Party: PL (since 2023)
- Parent: Jair Bolsonaro (father)
- Relatives: Flávio Bolsonaro (half-brother); Carlos Bolsonaro (half-brother); Eduardo Bolsonaro (half-brother); Michelle Bolsonaro (stepmother)

Jair Renan Valle Bolsonaro (born 10 April 1998) is a Brazilian politician who was elected member of the Chamber of Deputies in 2026. He has been a municipal councillor of Balneário Camboriú since 2025. From 2023 to 2025, he was a parliamentary assistant to Jorge Seif. He is the son of Jair Bolsonaro and the half-brother of Flávio, Carlos and Eduardo Bolsonaro.
