= Carlos Roberto Osório =

Brazilian business man (born 1966)

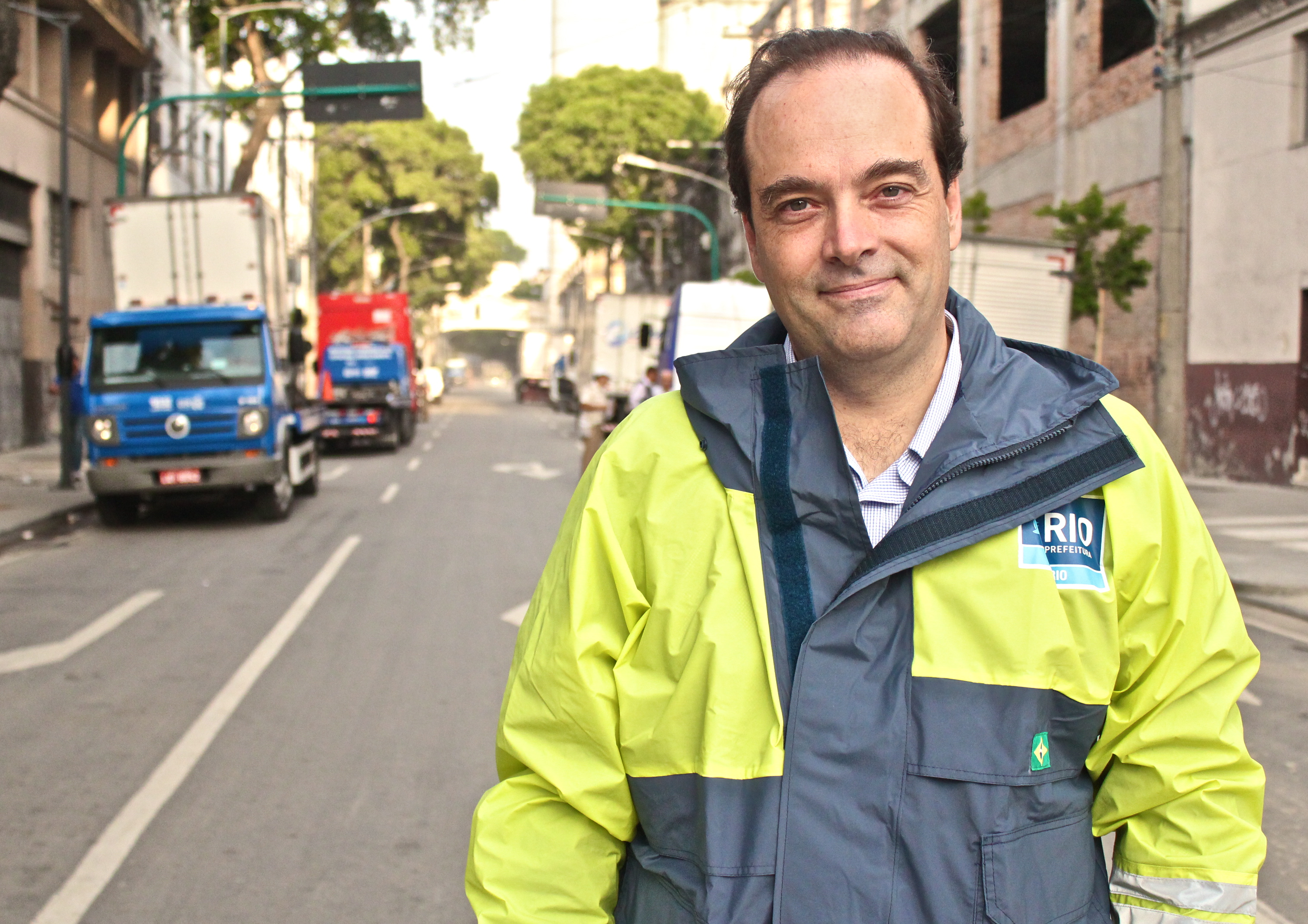
Carlos Roberto Osório

Carlos Roberto Osório (born 1966) is a Brazilian business man. He was a candidate for mayor of Rio de Janeiro City in 2016. He served as secretary general for the Brazilian Olympic Committee, the Organizing Committee for the 2007 Pan American Games, and the Rio de Janeiro bid for the 2016 Summer Olympics.
