= Barrinha =

- Municipality
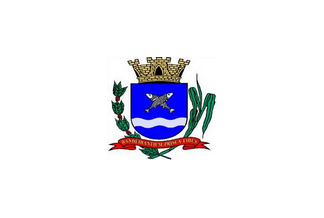
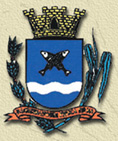
- Flag Coat of arms

- Location within Brazil
- Coordinates: 21°11′40.7″S 48°09′51.8″W
- Country: Brazil
- State: São Paulo

Government
  - Mayor: José Marcos Martins

Area
  - Total: 145.6 km^{2} (56.2 sq mi)

Population (August 1, 2022)
  - Total: 32,465
  - Density: 223/km^{2} (580/sq mi)
- Time zone: UTC−03:00
- Postal code: 14860-000
- Area code: 3505609
- Website: Official website

Barrinha is a municipality in the state of São Paulo in Brazil founded on December 30, 1953. The population is 33,180 (2020 est.) in an area of 146 km^{2}. The elevation is 505 m.

== Demographics ==
Historical population (municipality)
Year	Population	%±
1960	6,636	—
1970	8,430	27.0%
1980	12,564	49.0%
1991	18,853	50.1%
2000	24,207	28.4%
2010	28,496	17.7%
2022	32,092	12.6%

== Media ==
In telecommunications, the city was served by Companhia Telefônica Brasileira until 1973, when it began to be served by Telecomunicações de São Paulo. In July 1998, this company was acquired by Telefónica, which adopted the Vivo brand in 2012.

The company is currently an operator of cell phones, fixed lines, internet (fiber optics/4G) and television (satellite and cable).

== Religion ==
Christianity is present in the city as follows:

=== Catholic Church ===
The Catholic church in the municipality is part of the Roman Catholic Diocese of Jaboticabal.

=== Protestant Church ===
The most diverse evangelical beliefs are present in the city, mainly Pentecostal, including the Assemblies of God in Brazil (the largest evangelical church in the country), Christian Congregation in Brazil, among others. These denominations are growing more and more throughout Brazil.

== See also ==
- List of municipalities in São Paulo
- Interior of São Paulo
