= Eduardo Bolsonaro =

Brazilian politician (born 1984)

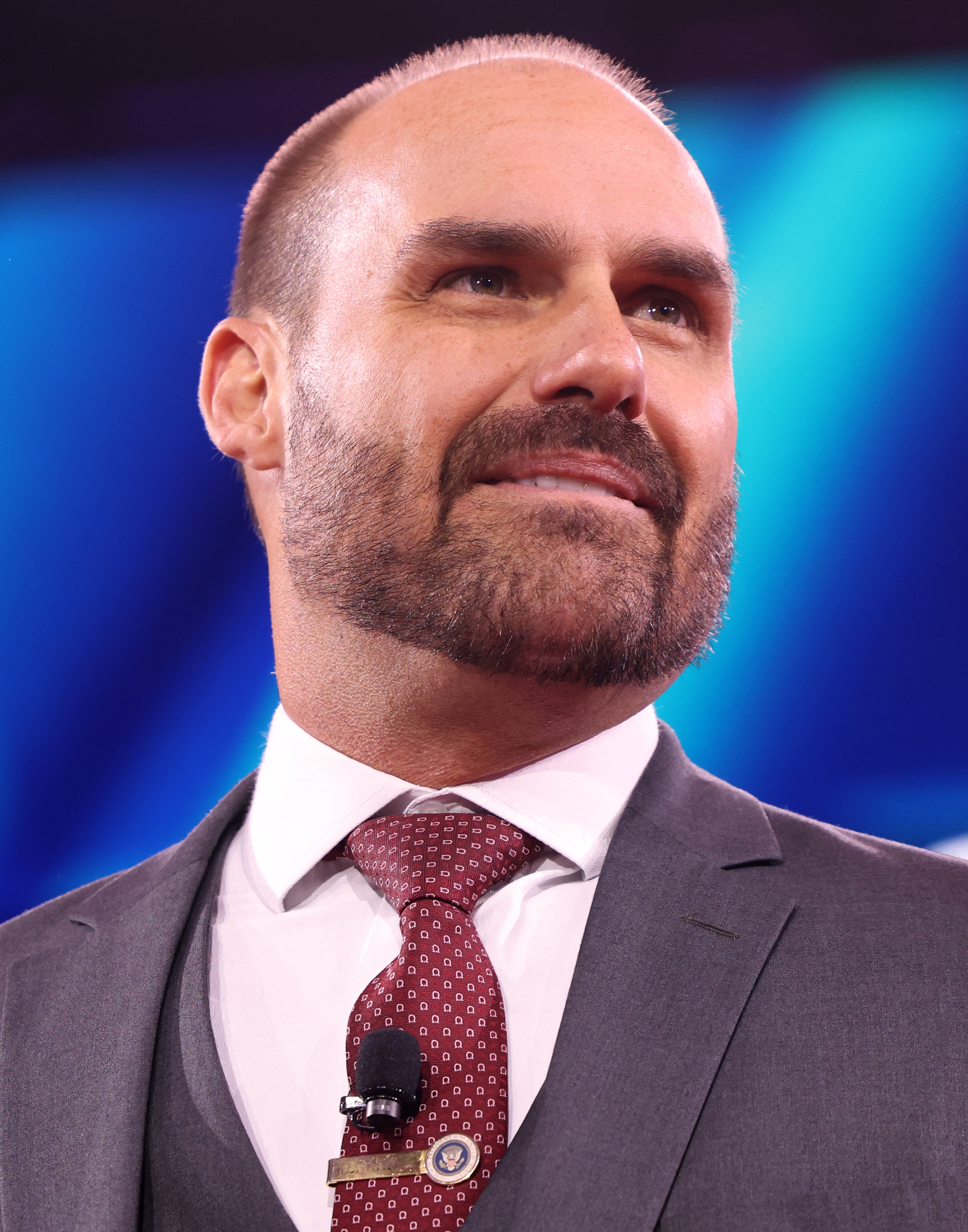
- Bolsonaro in 2025

Member of the Chamber of Deputies
- In office 1 February 2015 – 18 December 2025
- Constituency: São Paulo

Personal details
- Born: Eduardo Nantes Bolsonaro; 10 July 1984 (age 42) Resende, Rio de Janeiro, Brazil
- Party: PL (2022–present)
- Other political affiliations: PTB (2003–05); PP (2005–13); PSC (2013–18); PSL (2018–22); UNIÃO (2022)
- Spouse: Heloísa Wolf (m. 2019)
- Children: 2
- Parents: Jair Bolsonaro; Rogéria Nantes Braga
- Relatives: Flavio and Carlos Bolsonaro (brothers); Jair Renan Bolsonaro (half-brother); Michelle Bolsonaro (stepmother)
- Education: Federal University of Rio de Janeiro (LLB)
- Occupation: Politician; lawyer; federal police officer
- Website: www.eduardobolsonaro.com.br
- Criminal information
- Status: At-large
- Conviction: coercion in the course of judicial proceedings
- Trial: Supreme Federal Court (16 June 2026)
- Penalty: 4 years, 2 months
- Wanted by: Federal Police of Brazil
- Wanted since: 8 October 2026
- Time at large: 40 days

Eduardo Nantes Bolsonaro (born 10 July 1984) is a Brazilian politician, lawyer, and former federal police officer. He is the third child of Jair Bolsonaro, the former president of Brazil. Since March 2022, he has been affiliated with the Liberal Party. Between 18 March and 20 July 2025, he was on leave from his position as Member of the Chamber of Deputies, residing in the United States, where he coordinated commercial sanctions for Brazil in an attempt to free his father from being prosecuted.

On 16 June 2026, the First Panel of the Supreme Federal Court unanimously convicted Eduardo of coercion in the course of judicial proceedings and sentenced him to 4 years and 2 months in prison and disqualified him from holding public office for eight years following the completion of his sentence. On 8 October 2026, Justice Alexandre de Moraes declared that his conviction had become res judicata and ordered him to begin serving his sentence. Moraes also ordered the cancellation of all of Eduardo’s passports.

== Career ==
He has been a member of the Chamber of Deputies since 2015, and is affiliated to the Social Liberal Party (PSL). In 2018, he was re-elected to a second term as Federal Deputy, being the most voted lawmaker in Brazil's history after he received 1.8 million votes.

In February 2019, it was reported that Bolsonaro was joining The Movement. The European-based organisation supports right-wing populism and was founded by former White House Chief Strategist Steve Bannon. He is the representative for the group in South America.

In the Chamber of Deputies, Bolsonaro chairs the International Affairs and National Defense Committee.

Having previously lived in Maine and Colorado, Bolsonaro says he learned English while "flipping burgers", which led to his father inviting him to become ambassador to the United States. In October 2019, after being confirmed as leader of the PSL in the Chamber of Deputies, Bolsonaro withdrew from his nomination and President Bolsonaro nominated the Chargé d'Affaires Nesttor Forster.

On 31 October 2019, Bolsonaro threatened to introduce a "new AI-5" in response to accused left-wing radicalization. AI-5 or Institutional Act Number Five was the fifth of seventeen major decrees issued by the military dictatorship of Brazil that gave them the power to override the government and constitution.

Bolsonaro, signed the Madrid Charter, a document drafted by the conservative Spanish political party Vox that describes left-wing groups as enemies of Ibero-America involved in a "criminal project" that are "under the umbrella of the Cuban regime". He signed the document along with Keiko Fujimori and Rafael López Aliaga of Peru, Javier Milei of Argentina, José Antonio Kast of Chile, María Corina Machado of Venezuela and Giorgia Meloni of Italy. Following Meloni's success in the 2022 Italian general election, Bolsonaro celebrated her victory stating "Italy’s new prime minister is God, fatherland and family".

In March 2025, Bolsonaro announced on social media that he planned to step down as deputy and seek asylum in the U.S., after claiming that the Brazilian Supreme Court began considering the process to revoke his passport after he allegedly tried to intervene in the case revolving his father Jair in regards to the 2022 Brazilian coup plot; Brazilian top prosecutors denied Bolsonaro's claims. In December 2025, he was removed as a deputy by speaker Hugo Motta, citing his absence in more than 80% of sessions for the current congressional term. Prior to the 2026 Brazilian general election, Bolsonaro urged his brother Flávio Bolsonaro to flee Brazil if he lost.

== Personal life ==
His brothers are Flávio Bolsonaro, a member of the Legislative Assembly of Rio de Janeiro from 2003 to 2019 and currently member of the Federal Senate, and Carlos Bolsonaro, a member of the Rio de Janeiro City Council since 2001. He married psychologist Heloísa Wolf on 25 May 2019, in a small wedding at Santa Tereza, Rio de Janeiro. Bolsonaro's father Jair, who was then president of Brazil, and his stepmother Michelle, attended the ceremony. Unlike his father, he speaks fluent English. The couple's daughter, Geórgia Wolf Bolsonaro, was born in October 2020 and son Jair Henrique Bolsonaro in September 2023.

Eduardo is a fan of the band Forfun.

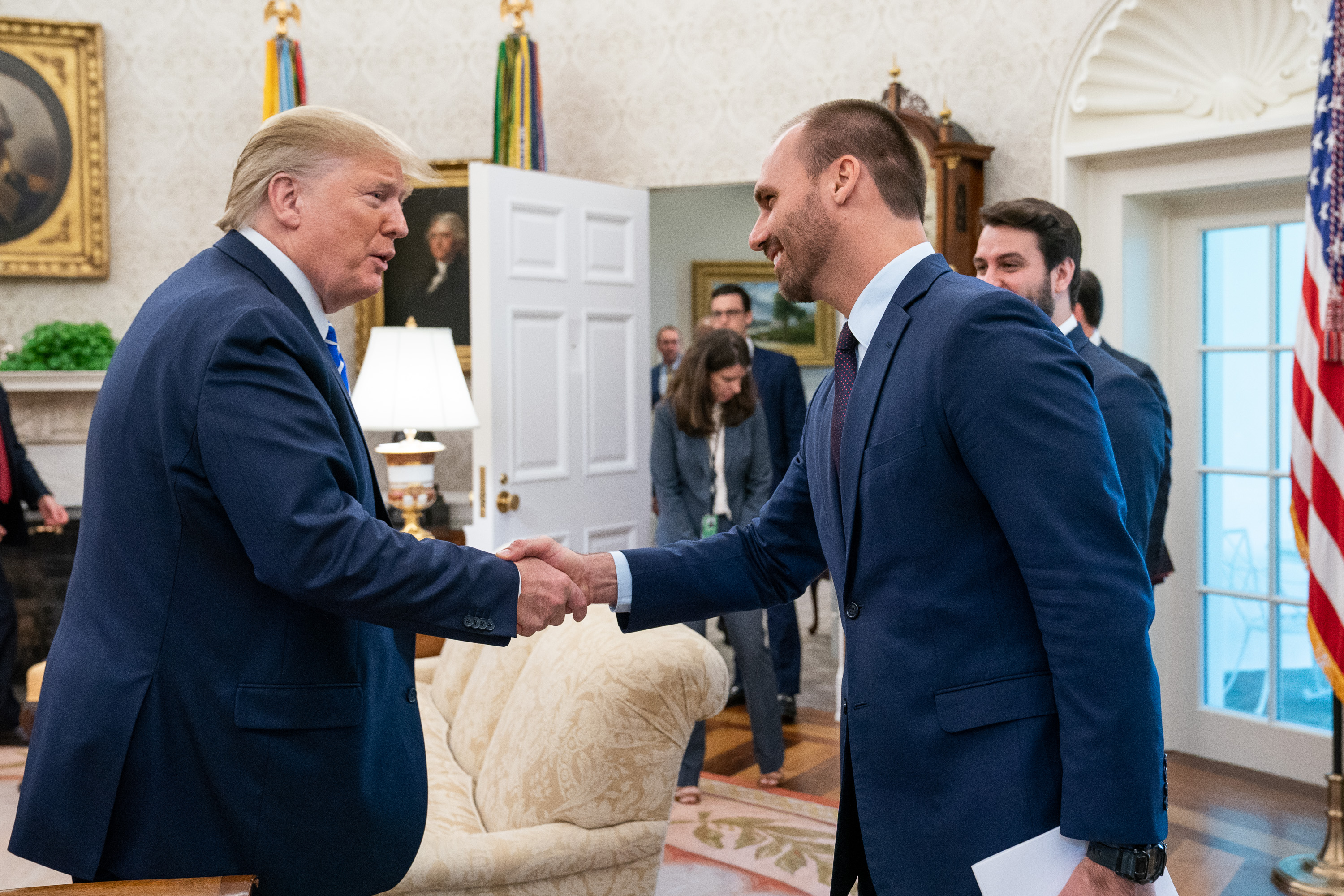
Eduardo Bolsonaro with U.S. President Donald Trump in the Oval Office, 30 August 2019

== Electoral results ==
Year	Candidacy (Party)	Votes (#)	Result
2014	Federal Deputy for São Paulo (PSC)	82,224 (#64)	Elected
2018	Federal Deputy for São Paulo (PSL); 2nd term in a row	1,843,735 (#1)	Elected
2022	Federal Deputy for São Paulo (PSL); 3rd term in a row	741,701 (#3)	Elected

== Awards ==
In 2015, Eduardo Bolsonaro ranked first in the category "Combating Corruption and Organized Crime" of the Focus Awards 2015. Bolsonaro had 16,769 votes, more than 10 thousand ahead of the second place. In 2017, he ranked first in the category of "Best Deputy" of the Focus Awards 2017. He had 55,256 votes, almost three times ahead of the second place.

== Criticism and controversy ==
=== "New AI-5" ===
In late October 2019, Eduardo said a "new AI-5" was a possibility in case of "left-wing radicalization" in Brazil. The speech took place in an interview with journalist Leda Nagle's YouTube channel after a question about the protests in Chile. Institutional Act Number Five (AI-5) was edited in 1968, during the harshest period of the Brazilian military dictatorship and resulted in the dissolution of the National Congress and state legislative assemblies, in addition to suspending constitutional guarantees, allowing the rescission of political rights in a summary form and the end of habeas corpus. The period that followed AI-5 was marked by intensification of censorship and political repression, with torture and assassination of opponents of the regime. This statement generated widespread negative reaction from left, center and right parties, in addition to the judiciary. The opposition said it will denounce Eduardo to the Parliamentary Ethics and Decoration Council. Mayor Rodrigo Maia said in an official statement that the declaration on AI-5 was "repugnant" and that the "repeated apology for the instruments of the dictatorship is punishable by the tools that hold the Brazilian democratic institutions"

The Constitution guarantees Eduardo Bolsonaro not to be punished "for any of his opinions, words or votes", the so-called "parliamentary immunity" provided for in Article 53 of the Constitution. However, the Constitution itself also states in Article 55 that a parliamentarian may lose his or her mandate for "breach of decorum" if there is "abuse of the prerogatives (rights)" guaranteed to congressmen. Based on this, the opposition announced that it will ask for Eduardo's impeachment in the Council of Ethics and Parliamentary Decor. After the strong negative reaction and being reprimanded by President Jair Bolsonaro, the deputy claimed he had been misinterpreted and apologized for the statement.

== See also ==
- Duduzile Zuma-Sambudla, daughter of Former South African President Jacob Zuma
- Donald Trump Jr., son of 45th & 47th United States President Donald Trump
