= Social Christian Party (Brazil) =

Conservative political party in Brazil

Social Christian Party Partido Social Cristão
- President: Everaldo Pereira
- Founded: 1970 (as Republican Democratic Party); 1985 (as Social Christian Party)
- Dissolved: 15 June 2023; 3 years ago
- Merged into: Podemos
- Headquarters: Rio de Janeiro and Brasília, Brazil
- Membership: 422,840
- Ideology: Christian democracy Christian right Social conservatism
- Political position: Right-wing to far-right Historical: Centre-right
- Religion: Christianity
- TSE Identification Number: 20

Website
- psc.org.br/

The Social Christian Party (Portuguese: Partido Social Cristão, PSC) was a Christian-conservative political party in Brazil.

In the 2018 election, the party elected 2 Governors, 1 Senator, 9 Federal Deputies and 30 State Deputies.

In 2022, it announced plans to merge with Podemos. The merge was approved by the Superior Electoral Court on 15 June 2023.

== History ==
The party was founded in 1985, as a Christian democratic party. The party supported Fernando Collor de Mello in the presidential election of 1989, and in 1990, the party won first place in the state election for Alagoas, the home state of then-President Collor. However, from 1994, the party declined: its candidates repeatedly lost votes, surpassing only those from far-left parties, who originated from rebel wings of the Workers Party without popular support. The PSC did not elect more than 3 representatives in the three subsequent elections.

Former President Jair Bolsonaro is a former member of the party.

He joined the party in March 2016 to run for president in 2018. With that analysts pointed out that the party was in an increasingly right-wing movement; starting as a centre-right Christian democratic party, then adopting more conservative agenda and towards a nationalist platform.

However, Bolsonaro disagreed with Pastor Everaldo regarding the municipal elections alliance of PSC within PCdoB in Maranhão and joined the PSL.

== Ideology ==
Social Christianity derives itself from its supporters' belief that Christianity, more than a religion, is a state of mind that does not segregate and does not exclude, besides serving as a basis for people to make decisions in a rational way,

The party is often associated with conservative evangelical Protestantism because the leadership of the Pastor Everaldo Pereira, a national leader of Assemblies of God in Brazil, over the party. Despite this, the party does not have any affiliation with any church and many of the officials elected by the party, like the incumbents Governor and Vice Governor of Rio de Janeiro Wilson Witzel and Cláudio Castro being practising Catholics, with the latter being a well-known Catholic music singer and activist.

The party is a vocal supporter of social conservatism, harshly opposing abortion, LGBT rights, "gender theory" and the legalization of marijuana. On economics, the party is more moderate, supporting a free-market system with privatization of many of the Brazilian government-owned companies like Petrobrás with an extensive social safety net.

The party adopted a hard-line stance against organized crime and drug trafficking in the governorship of Rio de Janeiro. Under Witzel's government, the number of police operations substantially grew, and the number of police who died on duty has gone down, in addition the number of manslaughters, shootings and robberies went down, although civilian and criminal deaths in police-related incidents has increased. Nevertheless, Witzel has been criticized by the high number of civilian victims of the confrontational politics which he implemented, which includes poor children and elders.

Openly opposed to Marxism, it is historically anti-communist.

== Controversies ==
The PSC raised controversy by fielding an openly neo-Nazi candidate in the 2016 Rio de Janeiro legislative elections.

Several party leaders were arrested or dismissed in August 2020 for corruption, including Everaldo Pereira (PSC national president) and Wilson Witzel (governor of Rio de Janeiro).

== Electoral results ==
At the legislative elections of 6 October 2002, the party won 1 out of 513 seats in the Chamber of Deputies and no seats in the Senate. At the legislative elections of 1 October 2006, the party won 9 seats in the Chamber of Deputies. At the legislative elections of 3 October 2010, the party won 17 seats in the Chamber of Deputies and 1 seat in the Senate. At the legislative elections of 5 October 2014, the party won 13 seats in the Chamber of Deputies and 1 seat in the Senate. At the legislative elections of 7 October 2014, the party won 9 seats in the Chamber of Deputies and 1 seat in the Senate.

=== Presidential elections ===
Year	Candidate	Votes	%
1989	No candidate, endorsed Fernando Collor de Mello	n/a	n/a
1994	Hernani Fortuna	238,257	0.40%
1998	Sergio Bueno	124,546	0.20%
2002	No candidate, endorsed Anthony Garotinho	n/a	n/a
2010	No candidate, endorsed Dilma Rousseff	n/a	n/a
2014	Pastor Everaldo	780,513	0.75%
2018	No candidate, endorsed Alvaro Dias	n/a	n/a
2022	No candidate, endorsed Jair Bolsonaro	n/a	n/a

=== Chamber of Deputies and Senate elections ===
Election	Chamber of Deputies				Federal Senate				Role in government
Election	Votes	%	Seats	+/–	Votes	%	Seats	+/–	Role in government
1986	207,903	0.44%	1 / 487	New	N/A	N/A	0 / 49	New	Opposition
1990	342,079	0.84%	6 / 502	▲5	N/A	N/A	0 / 31	0	Coalition
1994	213,734	0.47%	3 / 513	▼3	963,615	1.01%	0 / 54	0	Independent
1998	446,256	0.67%	3 / 513	0	371,873	0.60%	0 / 81	0	Independent
2002	504,611	0.58%	1 / 513	▼2	293,463	0.19%	0 / 81	0	Opposition
2006	1,747,863	1.88%	9 / 513	▲8	131,548	0.16%	0 / 81	0	Opposition
2010	3,072,546	3.18%	17 / 513	▲8	1,247,157	0.73%	1 / 81	▲1	Opposition
2014	2,520,421	2.59%	13 / 513	▼4	19,286	0.02%	0 / 81	▼1	Opposition
2018	1,765,226	1.80%	8 / 513	▼5	4,126,068	2.41%	1 / 81	▲1	Support
2022	1,951,486	1.77%	6 / 513	▼2	4,285,485	4.21%	1 / 81	0	Opposition

Preceded by 19 – PODE	Numbers of Brazilian Official Political Parties; 20 – SCP (PSC)	Succeeded by 21 – BCP (PCB)
