= Timeline of the Banco Master scandal =

Events related to the Banco Master scandal

The following article is a broad timeline covering events related to the Banco Master scandal. It covers both the chronology of the events themselves and that of the investigations, including Operation Compliance Zero, the liquidation of Banco Master, and the resulting judicial and political developments.

== 2025 ==
=== March ===
- 28 March: BRB (Banco de Brasília) announces that it will acquire Banco Master.

=== June ===
- 17 June: Brazil's antitrust authority (CADE) approves BRB's acquisition of Banco Master.

=== August ===
- 19 August: The Federal District Legislative Chamber approves BRB's acquisition of Banco Master.

=== September: ===
- 3 September: The Central Bank rejects BRB's acquisition of Banco Master.

=== November ===
- 17 November: Fictor Group announces the acquisition of Banco Master with an investment of R$ 3 billion (approximately US$600 million). Later in the night, Daniel Vorcaro is arrested at the airport while attempting to leave the country on a private jet bound for Malta.
- 18 November: The Federal Police launch Operation Compliance Zero. Later in the day, the Central Bank ordered the extrajudicial liquidation of Banco Master.
- 28 November: Vorcaro's defense requests that the case fall under the jurisdiction of the Supreme Federal Court.
- 29 November: One day after being selected as rapporteur of the case at the Supreme Court, Justice Dias Toffoli traveled on a private jet to Peru with Augusto Botelho, the lawyer representing Banco Master's compliance director. Later in the day, The Federal Regional Court of the 1st Region ordered the release of Daniel Vorcaro from prison.

=== December ===
- 2 December: Justice Dias Toffoli orders the case involving Banco Master to be placed under seal.
- 3 December: Justice Dias Toffoli orders that all investigations related to the Banco Master case be handled exclusively by the Supreme Court.
- 11 December: The press reported that the law firm of Viviane Barci de Moraes, the wife of Supreme Court Justice Alexandre de Moraes, had a contract with Banco Master providing for payments totaling R$131 million (approximately US$26 million) over a 36-month period.
- 18 December: The rapporteur of the case at the Brazilian Federal Court of Accounts (TCU), Justice Jhonatan de Jesus, set a deadline for the Central Bank to provide a written justification for the extrajudicial liquidation of Banco Master, raising the possibility that the monetary authority may have acted ‘precipitously’ and disregarded less drastic alternatives.”
- 22 December: The press reported that Justice Alexandre de Moraes held discussions about Banco Master with Central Bank President Gabriel Galípolo. Later in the day, Moraes and Galípolo issued separate official statements confirming that the meetings took place, but denying that they discussed the Banco Master case. Both stated that the conversations were about the effects of the application of the Magnitsky Act on Moraes.
- 24 December: Justice Dias Toffoli schedules a confrontation hearing for December 30 between Daniel Vorcaro, Central Bank Supervision Director Ailton Aquino, and a representative of BRB. On the same day, the press reported that Justice Alexandre de Moraes had allegedly called Galípolo around six times to discuss the Banco Master case.
- 26 December: The Central Bank questions the Supreme Federal Court about the confrontation hearing involving Ailton Aquino.
- 27 December: Brazilian Banking Federation (Febraban) and other financial associations issue a statement in defense of the Central Bank and its autonomy.
- 28 December: The press reported that Justice Alexandre de Moraes dined at Daniel Vorcaro's mansion in Brasília with other authorities in late 2024.
- 29 December: The Central Bank submitted its formal response to the TCU, explaining the technical and legal reasons that led it to order the liquidation of Banco Master. The documentation was requested by the court as part of the proceedings examining the regulator's actions.
- 30 December: After Toffoli backed down on the confrontation hearing, the Federal Police separately heard the testimonies of Daniel Vorcaro and former BRB president Henrique Costa. Ailton Aquino was excused from giving testimony.

== 2026 ==
=== January ===
- 2 January: The TCU authorized an on-site technical inspection of the documents held by the Central Bank regarding the liquidation of Banco Master. TCU auditors were granted direct access to internal notes, legal opinions, and records related to the case in order to reconstruct the decision-making process.
- 5 January: Justice Jhonatan de Jesus strengthened the inspection procedure, deeming the previously submitted documentation insufficient and requiring additional elements to assess whether the Central Bank observed principles such as reasoning, proportionality, and coherence in deciding on the liquidation. The court also considered the possibility of adopting a precautionary measure to protect assets related to the case.
- 15 January: The Central Bank of Brazil ordered the liquidation of the Reag fund in light of the multibillion-dollar scheme involving Banco Master. The fund had previously been targeted in a major operation by the São Paulo Public Prosecutor's Office against a multibillion-dollar fraud scheme in the fuel sector involving members of the Primeiro Comando da Capital (PCC).
- 21 January: The Central Bank of Brazil ordered the liquidation of Will Bank, a financial institution that is part of the Banco Master group.
- 23 January: The Federal Police launched Operation Paper Boat as part of the investigations into the Banco Master case. The operation targets suspected irregular financial transactions at Rioprevidência, the fund that manages the assets of retirees and pensioners in the state of Rio de Janeiro.

=== February ===
- 2 February: The financial arm of the Fictor Group, which attempted to acquire Banco Master, has filed for judicial recovery (bankruptcy protection).
- 11 February: Justice Jhonatan de Jesus, the rapporteur for the Master case at the TCU, restricted the Central Bank's access to the case proceedings. Later that day, a Federal Police forensic analysis found a reference to Justice Dias Toffoli on Daniel Vorcaro's cellphone. The findings were forwarded to the Chief Justice of the Supreme Court Edson Fachin, while a request was filed seeking Toffoli's disqualification as the case's rapporteur. In response, Toffoli's office stated that the request submitted by the Federal Police seeking to declare his recusal is based on “speculation” and lacks legal grounds.
- 12 February: A closed-door joint meeting with all members of the Supreme Court was held to discuss the case. Shortly afterward, the Court issued a unanimous statement saying that it was “not a proper case for an allegation of recusal,” and that it recognizes “the full validity of the acts carried out by Justice Dias Toffoli,” while expressing “personal support for Justice Dias Toffoli, respecting the dignity of His Excellency, as well as the absence of any grounds for recusal or disqualification.” Soon after the meeting ended, Toffoli decided to step down as rapporteur of the Banco Master case. Justice André Mendonça was randomly selected as the new rapporteur.
- 13 February: Justice André Mendonça held a meeting with Federal Police officers involved in the investigations into Banco Master. Mendonça asked the officers for a general overview of the investigation, an assessment of what has already been done, and the next steps.
- 25 February: The Parliamentary Inquiry Committee on organized crime in the Federal Senate approved the summoning of two brothers of Justice Dias Toffoli, former Central Bank president Roberto Campos Neto, and former Finance Minister Paulo Guedes. It also authorized the breach of the tax, telephone, and telematic secrecy of Banco Master and Maridt (a family company owned by the Toffoli brothers). The Committee further ordered hearings with Daniel Vorcaro and other executives linked to the financial institution. Finally, it approved invitations to hear Justices Dias Toffoli and Alexandre de Moraes, Central Bank president Gabriel Galípolo, as well as attorney Viviane Barci, Moraes's wife.

=== March ===
- 4 March: The Federal Police carried out the third phase of Operation Compliance Zero and arrested Daniel Vorcaro again. Vorcaro's brother-in-law, Fabiano Zettel, and security guard Luiz Phillipi Mourão were also arrested. Mourão died by suicide shortly after his arrest. The operation was authorized by Justice André Mendonça. Vorcaro was subsequently transferred to the Potim Penitentiary Complex, in the interior of the state of São Paulo. Former Central Bank supervisory director Paulo Sérgio Neves de Souza and former civil servant Belline Santana were also targeted by search and seizure warrants during the operation.
- 11 March: Shortly after being randomly assigned as rapporteur of a case that would require Congress to establish a Parliamentary Inquiry Commission to investigate Banco Master, Justice Dias Toffoli recused himself from the case, and it was reassigned to Justice Cristiano Zanin. Later, Toffoli also declared himself recused from participating in the Second Panel's decision regarding the arrest of Daniel Vorcaro. In both cases, Toffoli cited reasons of “personal grounds.”
- 19 March: Justice Gilmar Mendes annulled the breach of confidentiality of the Arleen investment fund approved by the Parliamentary Inquiry Commission on Organized Crime. The fund is linked to the asset manager Reag, which in turn is under investigation in the Banco Master case. The fund appears in the investigations because it acquired, in 2021, a stake in the Tayayá Resort, in the state of Paraná, which had belonged to a company owned by the family of Justice Dias Toffoli. Later in the day, Justice André Mendonça ordered the transfer of Daniel Vorcaro from a prison in São Paulo to the Federal Police Regional Headquarter in Brasília.
- 26 March: The Public Prosecutor's Office attached to the Federal Court of Accounts requested that the Court's Internal Affairs Office investigate the conduct of Justice Jhonatan de Jesus in the Banco Master case and suggested his recusal depending on the evidence gathered.
- 27 March: The Central Bank ordered the liquidation of the financial institution Entrepay, which belongs to the Entre Investimentos e Participações group.

=== April ===
- 8 April: Several media outlets have reported that data from Brazil's Federal Revenue Service indicate that the law firm of Viviane Barci de Moraes, wife of Justice Alexandre de Moraes, received R$80 million (approximately US$16 million) from Banco Master between 2024 and 2025. Later, the Governor of the Federal District, Celina Leão, ordered BRB to remove from their positions 12 executives still linked to the bank's former president, Paulo Henrique Costa, who is under investigation over the failed attempt to acquire Banco Master.
- 14 April: The rapporteur of the Parliamentary Inquiry Commission on Organized Crime, Senator Alessandro Vieira, presented his final report calling for the indictment of Justices Alexandre de Moraes, Dias Toffoli, and Gilmar Mendes, as well as Prosecutor General Paulo Gonet. However, the report was rejected by the commission by 6 votes to 4.
- 16 April: The former president of BRB, Paulo Henrique Costa, was arrested by the Federal Police in a new phase of Operation Compliance Zero. He is suspected of failing to follow governance practices and of allowing unsecured dealings with Banco Master. According to the investigation, Costa allegedly received at least six properties valued at R$146 million from Daniel Vorcaro in exchange for facilitating the scheme involving the bank.

=== May ===
- 6 May: The defense team of Daniel Vorcaro submitted a plea bargain proposal to the Federal Police and the Office of the Prosecutor General as part of the investigations into the Master case. The material was delivered on a USB flash drive, and its contents have already begun to be analyzed by the authorities. Following its receipt, investigators must assess the material to determine whether it contains new evidence and relevant information for the ongoing inquiries. This review period may take more than two months.
- 7 May: Senator Ciro Nogueira (PP), former Chief of Staff Minister under Jair Bolsonaro, was targeted in a search and seizure operation during a new phase of Operation Compliance Zero. According to the Federal Police, Nogueira received monthly payments of R$300,000 from Daniel Vorcaro and allegedly introduced a constitutional amendment aimed at expanding the coverage of the FGC (Credit Guarantee Fund) from R$250,000 to R$1 million. A brother of Nogueira and a cousin of Vorcaro were also targeted in the operation, which was authorized by Justice André Mendonça.
- 13 May: The Intercept Brasil published messages and audio recordings in which Senator and presidential candidate Flávio Bolsonaro (PL) negotiated US$24 million (R$134 million) directly with Daniel Vorcaro. The money was allegedly intended to finance the film Dark Horse, about Jair Bolsonaro's 2018 presidential campaign. Documents show that at least US$10.6 million (R$61 million) was paid between February and May 2025 in six bank transfers to finance the project. Analysis of the messages shows that part of the payments were made by Daniel Vorcaro to the Havengate Development Fund LP, based in Texas, whose registered agent is the “Law Offices of Paulo Calixto PLLC”, operated by Paulo Calixto, lawyer for Eduardo Bolsonaro.
- 14 May: The Federal Police arrested Henrique Vorcaro, father of Daniel Vorcaro, in a new phase of Operation Compliance Zero. In addition to him, six other people were arrested, including two federal police officers and a police commissioner. The operation was authorized by Justice André Mendonça.
- 18 May: At the request of the Federal Police, Justice André Mendonça authorized the transfer of Daniel Vorcaro to a regular cell in the Federal Police detention facility, where he will be subject to the institution's internal rules. Vorcaro had been held in a state-major room since 4 March. The change comes following the conclusion of the plea bargain drafting process.
- 20 May: The Federal Police rejected Daniel Vorcaro's plea bargain request. The reason for the rejection was that the Federal Police concluded that Vorcaro had not provided any new information beyond what investigators had already gathered so far. Vorcaro's defense team, however, will continue negotiations with the Office of the Prosecutor General.
- 22 May: Justice André Mendonça authorized the transfer of banker Daniel Vorcaro back to the special detention room at the Federal Police headquarters reserved for authorities and individuals with special legal status. In the decision, the minister cited a statement from the Office of the Prosecutor General regarding the risks associated with the transfer, due to the media exposure surrounding the case and the possibility of contact with other members of the alleged criminal organization.
- 26 May: The former governor of Rio de Janeiro, Cláudio Castro (PL), was targeted in a search and seizure operation during the eighth phase of Operation Compliance Zero. The Federal Police are investigating R$3 billion (approximately US$530 million) in investments by Rioprevidência – the pension fund for public servants of the state of Rio de Janeiro – in Banco Master.

=== June ===
- 10 June: The Federal Police rejected Daniel Vorcaro's second plea bargain proposal, citing a lack of new information and evidence. The decision was communicated to the case's rapporteur, Justice André Mendonça. Investigators believe that Vorcaro failed to provide previously unknown information or sufficient documentation and view the proposal as an attempt to avoid being transferred back to a regular prison. The Office of the Prosecutor General, with which Vorcaro's defense team is also negotiating, has not yet issued a formal response regarding the case.
- 15 June: The Office of the Prosecutor General formally informed the Supreme Federal Court that it had also rejected Daniel Vorcaro's second plea bargain proposal, as the information presented did not provide new evidence and would have little utility for the investigations.
- 18 June: Senator Jaques Wagner (PT), the government's leader in the Federal Senate, was targeted by a Federal Police search-and-seizure operation during the ninth phase of Operation Compliance Zero. In total, 18 warrants issued by the Supreme Federal Court were executed in the states of Bahia and São Paulo, as well as in the Federal District. According to the ruling authorizing the operation, the Federal Police identified "indications of the receipt of undue economic benefits by the lawmaker, either directly or indirectly, through family members, trusted associates, and corporate structures linked to the economic group under investigation."
- 25 June: Daniel Vorcaro is transferred to a cell at the 19th Battalion of the Federal District Military Police ("Papudinha"). Justice André Mendonça ordered the transfer following the rejection of his plea bargain agreements.

=== July ===
- 23 July: Justice André Mendonça authorized the Federal Police to formally investigate transfers made by Daniel Vorcaro regarding the financing of the film Dark Horse. The investigation will examine Vorcaro, Flávio Bolsonaro, and Eduardo Bolsonaro for suspected foreign exchange evasion, money laundering, and corruption offenses.

=== September ===
- 1 September:
  - Piauí magazine released previously unpublished data from a Council for Financial Activities Control (Coaf) report showing that Daniel Vorcaro sent, in September 2025, another installment worth $1.6 million to the fund that managed Dark Horse film's money. The report contradicts Flávio Bolsonaro's claim that the last transfer had occurred in May 2025. The total amount sent by Vorcaro, until then, was $10.6 million; with the investigation's findings, it rises to $12.3 million.
  - O Estado de S. Paulo revealed WhatsApp messages between Justice Alexandre de Moraes and Daniel Vorcaro, recovered from the banker's phone, in which he asked two days before his arrest whether he "had to be gone by Monday." A Federal Police report — its confidentiality lifted by Justice André Mendonça — also showed him telling Moraes he owed him a "debt for life" in a message sent on 14 November 2025. Separately, metadata showed Moraes had accessed and edited a R$131 million legal-services contract between his wife's law firm and Banco Master; the firm confirmed the edit, saying compliance had asked him to check for conflicts of interest. The report also stated that Vorcaro negotiated transferring shares in a private jet and a helicopter as partial payment for a R$50 million contract with Viviane Barci de Moraes's law firm, with recovered messages showing her confirming she was enjoying use of the aircraft shares. The messages also show Banco Master had issued Moraes's children R$300,000 credit-card limits, arranged directly through Vorcaro.
  - The Federal Police report also shows messages between Vorcaro and Prosecutor General Paulo Gonet, intermediated by lawyer Ciro Soares, revealing a close relationship between the two. In March 2025, Gonet reportedly expressed enthusiasm about a whiskey-tasting event in London funded by Vorcaro — an event to which Gonet's son was also invited, with the trip paid for by the banker — and sent messages saying he missed Vorcaro and was "rooting for" him, on the same day the BRB announced its purchase of 58% of Banco Master's capital. The conversations also indicate that Vorcaro counted on the support of "Andrei and Paulo" (PF director-general Andrei Rodrigues and Gonet) and, days before his arrest, asked that a police operation be delayed because of a holiday. Later in the day, Gonet requested the nullification of the Federal Police report. Gonet states that Mendonça "imposed the investigation" of Moraes and that it is not a judge's place to conduct an investigation. He also states that a Supreme Court justice could only be investigated with the approval of the other justices.
- 2 September: Following press reports, Justice André Mendonça confirmed that he met with Daniel Vorcaro in March 2025. According to Mendonça, the meeting took place only once and reportedly concerned a Banco Master lawsuit that was to be judged by the Court. The Attorney General's Office forwarded to the Supreme Court a plea bargain proposal from João Carlos Mansur, founder and former chairman of the board of directors of the Reag group. Later, Justice André Mendonça's office confirmed that Daniel Vorcaro gave testimony on an urgent basis last week to an assistant judge overseeing the case, following a request from the former banker's lawyers. According to the investigation, Vorcaro reported having suffered psychological torture, mistreatment, and threats during the period he was held by the Federal Police, and stated that the institution had rejected his plea bargain agreement in order to shield its director-general, Andrei Rodrigues.
- 3 September:
  - O Estado de S. Paulo reported that the Attorney General's Office reached a plea bargain agreement with financial market operator Antonio Carlos Freixo Júnior, owner of Entre Investimentos e Participações, a company used to transfer money between Daniel Vorcaro and the production of Dark Horse. According to the report, based on sources familiar with the case, Freixo Júnior provided investigators with attachments as part of his agreement, detailing remittances he made abroad to the Havengate fund, based in Texas and managed by immigration lawyer Paulo Calixto, who has ties to former federal congressman Eduardo Bolsonaro. Freixo Júnior also detailed the numerous remittances he made — including in cash, carried in suitcases — at Vorcaro's request, and claimed he did not know that the transfers to Havengate were meant for the film's production. The goal of the investigation is to determine whether the money given by Vorcaro was actually used for the film or was diverted to cover Eduardo Bolsonaro's expenses abroad. The agreement still needs to be approved by Justice André Mendonça.
  - The UOL news portal released details of Daniel Vorcaro's plea bargain proposal, which was later rejected. According to the report, Vorcaro told the Federal Police that the R$2 million donation to Tarcísio de Freitas' campaign and the R$3 million donation to Jair Bolsonaro in the 2022 election were, in fact, tied to a bribery negotiation arranged with Gilberto Kassab. He then denied having any relationship with Vorcaro and said the accusations were "fanciful."
  - Justice Alexandre de Moraes has requested that Justice André Mendonça be investigated as part of Inquiry 4781 (the "Fake News Inquiry") for abuse of authority, administrative misconduct, and a crime of malfeasance in his handling of the Master case and the INSS fraud scheme. Court president Justice Edson Fachin, who has the authority to decide, gave Moraes and Mendonça — as well as Attorney General Paulo Gonet and the Director-General of the Federal Police Andrei Rodrigues — five days to respond.
- 6 September: Justice André Mendonça has cleared the Federal Police report—which revealed messages from banker Daniel Vorcaro to Justice Alexandre de Moraes—for review by the full bench of the STF. The final decision, however, rests with the Court's president, Edson Fachin.
- 7 September: Thirteen retired justices of the Federal Supreme Court released a letter asking the Court's president, Edson Fachin, to urgently convene a public session so that the full bench can order an immediate and rigorous investigation into the facts affecting the court. The signatories describe the moment as the "most acute crisis" in the Supreme Court's history. They state that the facts that have come to light have been undermining the Court's prestige and authority, the public's trust, and even the stability of democratic institutions. The letter was signed by the following former justices: Néri da Silveira, Francisco Rezek, Sydney Sanches, Celso de Mello, Carlos Velloso, Ilmar Galvão, Nelson Jobim, Ellen Gracie, Cezar Peluso, Ayres Britto, Joaquim Barbosa, Eros Grau and Rosa Weber.
- 8 September: Justice André Mendonça ordered the preventive removal of the Federal Police's Director-General, Andrei Rodrigues, and the agency's Intelligence Director, Leandro Almada. In his ruling, Mendonça states that he was illegally monitored by the Federal Police for more than a month and lists six reports produced between August 3 and 31 containing analyses of his conduct and of his relationship with the Attorney General Jorge Messias. Shortly afterward, the STF's Second Panel formed a majority to uphold the removal of Andrei and Almada. Justices Nunes Marques and Luiz Fux followed Mendonça's vote, while Justice Gilmar Mendes asked for more time to review the case, suspending the judgment.
- 9 September: Justice Flávio Dino ordered the immediate reinstatement of Andrei Rodrigues as director-general of the Federal Police and of Leandro Almada as head of the agency's Police Intelligence Directorate; shortly afterward, however, the president of the Federal Supreme Court, Justice Edson Fachin, suspended both Justice André Mendonça's decision to remove the two officials and Dino's decision overturning that suspension, meaning both remain in their posts until the full court issues a final ruling. At the same time, Fachin decided to remove Justice Alexandre de Moraes as rapporteur of the Fake News inquiry and to take over the investigation himself, while upholding the validity of the actions Moraes had taken while leading the case; he also called an extraordinary session for next Tuesday, the 15th, at 10 a.m., at which the full court is expected to rule on the legality of Mendonça's order that led to a deeper analysis of Daniel Vorcaro's phone, on the validity of the material the Federal Police produced as a result, and on the Prosecutor General's Office's request to annul the procedure. In a related development, Justice André Mendonça approved the plea deal of Antônio Carlos Freixo Júnior, owner of Entre Investimentos, the company that, at Vorcaro's direction, made payments toward the film "Dark Horse," about former president Jair Bolsonaro.
- 10 September: The Federal Police launched Operation Make Up and carried out 49 search and seizure warrants related to the financing of the film Dark Horse. Karina Gama, the film's producer, and federal deputy Mario Frias (PL) are targets of the operation. The investigation is looking into an alleged scheme to divert public funds originating from congressional earmarks (emendas parlamentares). The operation was authorized by Justice Flávio Dino. Later in the night, Justice Edson Fachin asked Justice André Mendonça to lift the seal on the Master case. Fachin argued that the information should be used in the trial concerning the messages between Moraes and Vorcaro, scheduled for next Tuesday. Less than an hour later, Mendonça complied with the request and lifted the seal.
- 11 September:
  - A report by piauí magazine revealed that a Federal Police report raises the possibility that Justice Dias Toffoli may be the "ultimate beneficiary" or "de facto owner" of the Arleen Private Equity Investment Fund, which reportedly received at least R$35 million from Daniel Vorcaro. The Federal Police document indicates that, through an operation involving the company Egide I, the fund's resources were transferred to a structure registered in the British Virgin Islands, a territory known as a tax haven.
  - Justice Alexandre de Moraes asked Chief Justice Edson Fachin to have the full court jointly review, at the extraordinary session scheduled for Tuesday, both the suspicions raised against him and the questions surrounding Justice André Mendonça's handling of the investigations related to Banco Master and the INSS fraud case. Shortly afterward, Fachin granted a request from Prosecutor General Paulo Gonet and gave Justice André Mendonça 24 hours to lift the seal entirely on the Master case investigations, not just the portions concerning Moraes' conduct.
  - In a statement sent to the Supreme Court, Federal Police Director-General Andrei Rodrigues denied that any illegal surveillance of Justice André Mendonça had taken place. Andrei stated that the reports in question were routine intelligence analyses and that the material had been forwarded to the Supreme Court in compliance with an order from Justice Alexandre de Moraes.
- 12 September: The chief justice Edson Fachin denied Justice Alexandre de Moraes's request that the Court's full bench jointly decide whether or not to open investigations against him and Justice André Mendonça. With this decision, Fachin kept in place the plenary session scheduled for next Tuesday (15th), dedicated exclusively to the Federal Police report that pointed to more than 50 messages from Daniel Vorcaro to Moraes. In the same order, Fachin set 23 September for a session to examine questions about Mendonça's handling of the Master and INSS cases — information gathered in a Federal Police intelligence report sent to the Supreme Court at Moraes's request. Later, Fachin personally took over as rapporteur for the discussion of the alleged relationship between Moraes and Vorcaro, and ordered that the cases related to the investigations into the INSS and Banco Master fraud be forwarded to the Court's Presidency. As a result, both cases will remain stalled until a new ruling is issued.
- 15 September: The press released new excerpts of dialogues extracted from Vorcaro's phone, allegedly showing a close relationship between the children of Justices Luiz Fux and Nunes Marques and the former banker. Shortly after, the Supreme Court began hearing the request for Justice Alexandre de Moraes to be investigated. The discussion, however, was limited to preliminary matters. The vote currently stands at 4–4 against merging the petition on opening an investigation into Moraes (PET 16662) with the one concerning Justice André Mendonça (PET 16704), in a joint session scheduled for 23 September. Justices Edson Fachin, André Mendonça, Luiz Fux, and Cármen Lúcia voted against the merger. Justices Flávio Dino, Cristiano Zanin, Alexandre de Moraes, and Gilmar Mendes voted in favor. In the event of a tie, the decision falls to Chief Justice Fachin — however, the announcement of the result was postponed due to Justice Dino's request for more time to review the case (pedido de vista). Justices Nunes Marques and Dias Toffoli declared themselves recused from the case.
- 17 September: Justice Edson Fachin postponed the review of the case that would assess Justice André Mendonça's conduct as rapporteur in the Master and INSS cases. The judgment had been scheduled for September 23 and will be rescheduled "at an opportune time." Fachin decided to postpone this session because the ruling on the procedural question of whether Mendonça's and Moraes's conduct should be evaluated jointly or separately had not yet been concluded.
- 20 September: The newspaper O Globo released a video showing that Justice Alexandre de Moraes and his wife, Viviane Barci de Moraes, used an private aircraft linked to former banker Daniel Vorcaro on 22 August 2025. The landing, at Santos Dumont Airport in Rio de Janeiro, was recorded on video obtained by the newspaper. In a statement sent to the press, the Barci de Moraes law firm said it hires air taxi services and that Prime Aviation is among the companies used. "On none of the flights taken on Prime Aviation aircraft with members of the firm was Daniel Vorcaro or any other person unrelated to the firm present," the statement said.
- 21 September: Messages from Daniel Vorcaro's cell phone, obtained by the Federal Police and sent to the Supreme Court, reveal a R$427 million (US$83.3 million) legal services contract with the so-called "Turma do KN" ("KN's Crew"). The payment would be made in the event of favorable rulings in cases of interest to Banco Master in the higher courts, which could release R$8.5 billion (US$1.66 billion) in court-ordered debt payments (precatórios). According to the exchanged messages, "KN" would be a reference to Justice Kassio Nunes Marques. The "turma" (crew/group) would refer to appellate judge Newton Ramos and his wife, lawyer Camilla Ramos.
- 22 September: Justice André Mendonça has asked for the dismissal of the investigation opened on the basis of accusations made by Alexandre de Moraes regarding his handling of the Banco Master and INSS cases. In a filing submitted to the Court's presidency, Mendonça rejected the accusations and argued that Moraes had distorted the content of intelligence reports produced by the Federal Police. According to him, using this material to suggest the possible commission of crimes amounts to an instrumentalization of the Federal Police, in an "absurd maneuver" and a "clear misuse of purpose." Finally, he asked that Moraes himself be investigated on suspicion of abuse of power and false criminal accusation.
- 23 September: Justice Cristiano Zanin denied a request for an injunction filed by Senator Alessandro Vieira (MDB) seeking to compel the Senate presidency to open a Parliamentary Commission of Inquiry into the relationship between Supreme Federal Court justices and Daniel Vorcaro.
- 25 September: Brazil's National Council of the Public Prosecutor's Office (CNMP) voted 5–4 not to open an investigation into Prosecutor General Paulo Gonet over suspected ties to Daniel Vorcaro. The Council also unanimously decided not to remove Gonet from the Banco Master case.

=== October ===
- 28 October: Brazil’s Federal Police have formally recommended charges against former banker Daniel Vorcaro, former BRB president Paulo Henrique Costa and 13 other people. According to the Federal Police, Vorcaro and Costa made up the “strategic core of the criminal organization.” In the same document, the investigators request an additional 60 days to continue the investigation, complete forensic analyses and submit a supplementary report. The request will be reviewed by Supreme Court Justice André Mendonça.

=== November ===
- 4 November: Justice André Mendonça gave the Prosecutor General's Office 15 days to respond to the Federal Police report recommending charges against Daniel Vorcaro and 14 others over fraud at the Banco de Brasília (BRB), whose losses the police estimated at about R$2.7 billion. The same deadline applied to the police request for a 60-day extension of the investigation.
- 5 November: Justice Edson Fachin denied requests to revoke the pretrial detention of Fabiano Zettel, Vorcaro's brother-in-law and alleged financial operator of the scheme, or to convert it to house arrest.
- 6 November: Justice Edson Fachin approved the plea agreement between the PGR and João Carlos Mansur, founder of the asset manager Reag, the first plea deal in Operation Compliance Zero. Mansur reportedly committed to helping investigators trace about R$20 billion linked to Vorcaro.
- 6 November: Brazil's civil aviation agency (Anac) asked the operators of two private aircraft linked to Vorcaro to explain whether they had carried paying passengers, after reports that one of them may have flown Justice Alexandre de Moraes from Brasília to São Paulo on 7 August 2025. The pilot of one of the flights stated that Moraes was not on board.
- 9 November: It was reported that the Supreme Court would likely postpone until February 2027 the judgment on the petitions concerning Justices Moraes and Mendonça, suspended since 15 September by Justice Flávio Dino's request for more time to review the case.
- 10 November: The Federal Police technical team completed three reports on the ties of Justices Moraes, Kassio Nunes Marques and Dias Toffoli to Vorcaro. The police leadership ordered them redone, arguing that they went beyond the purely descriptive scope set by Fachin and did not include all mentions of Supreme Court members.
- 10 November: The Federal Police removed delegates Daniel Mostardeiro Cola and Wedson Cajé Lopes, who had worked on the reports about Supreme Court justices, from their leadership posts. Director-General Andrei Rodrigues cited a breach of trust, alleging they had filed the reports in the internal system before a review meeting with the leadership. The National Association of Federal Police Delegates (ADPF) condemned the removals, and Rodrigues resigned his membership in the association. The Ministry of Justice formally asked the police for an explanation.
- 11 November: The Senate Public Security Committee approved invitations for Justice Minister Wellington César Lima e Silva, Andrei Rodrigues, the two removed delegates and the ADPF president to explain the changes to the reports and the removals.
- 18 November: After testifying before a joint session of the Senate Justice and Public Security committees, Andrei Rodrigues delivered to Justice Fachin ten reports, one on each sitting Supreme Court justice, listing mentions of them found on Vorcaro's phones. Fachin forwarded the reports on Moraes, Nunes Marques, Toffoli and Mendonça to Prosecutor General Paulo Gonet, giving him 15 days to decide whether to request investigations, and archived the other six, in which the justices were only mentioned by third parties.
- 19 November: Justice Fachin denied the release of Felipe Cançado Vorcaro, Daniel Vorcaro's cousin. In the same decision, he granted a police request ordering Signature Luxury Services LLC to provide information on luxury expenses paid at Vorcaro's request for the benefit of public figures
- 19 November: Following the PGR's recommendation, Fachin upheld Daniel Vorcaro's pretrial detention and rejected his request for release with an electronic ankle monitor. Fachin cited Vorcaro's alleged leadership role in the criminal organization and his capacity to influence public and private agents. The decision was made public on 20 November.
- 20 November: Justice Mendonça waived the secrecy of the police report on mentions of his name on Vorcaro's phones (Pet 17.146) and asked Justice Fachin to make it public, which Fachin did the same day. The report found no direct conversations between Mendonça and Vorcaro, but listed messages from eight people who mentioned the justice in contacts with the banker. These included lawyer Ciro Soares, who arranged a meeting between the two in 2025 and said in an audio message that he had taken Mendonça to a tailor. Mendonça released invoices totalling R$26,430 for clothing he said he had paid for himself.
