= Estilo =

Estilo may refer to:

- Colegio Estilo, a private secular school in Madrid, Spain founded in '59
- Veste S.A. Estilo, a Brazilian retail company
- Estilo Hip Hop, a documentary film
- Estilo milonguero, an Argentine tango apilado/confiteria style
- Navidad a mi estilo (A Christmas in My Style), album of Puerto Rican salsa singer Víctor Manuelle
- Zen Estilo, a Maruti brand vehicle discontinued in February 2014 in India
- Estilo Manueline, a Portuguese late-gothic architectural style
