= Andrei Rodrigues =

Brazilian federal police delegate

- Andrei in 2025

Director-General of Federal Police
- Incumbent
- Assumed office 2 January 2023 (Note: Suspended: 8 – 9 September 2026)
- Minister: Flávio Dino; Ricardo Lewandowski; Wellington Lima e Silva
- Preceded by: Márcio Nunes de Oliveira

Personal details
- Born: Andrei Augusto Passos Rodrigues; 1970 (age 55–56) Pelotas, Rio Grande do Sul, Brazil
- Education: Federal University of Pelotas (LLB)
- Profession: Federal police delegate

Andrei Augusto Passos Rodrigues (born 1970) is a Brazilian federal police delegate who served as Director-General of Brazil's Federal Police since 2023. He holds a law degree from the Federal University of Pelotas (UFPel) and completed postgraduate studies at the Federal Judiciary's School of Magistrates of Rio Grande do Sul (Esmafe). He also studied Public Security Management through Brazil's National Public Security Secretariat (Senasp) and the Getulio Vargas Foundation (FGV), and between 2019 and 2020 completed a master's degree in Advanced International Security Management through Spain's Guardia Civil University Center and Madrid's Carlos III University. He has served as a federal police delegate for more than two decades.

Andrei was recommended by then Minister of Justice Flávio Dino to President Luiz Inácio Lula da Silva for the position of Director-General. He was sworn in as Director-General on January 10, having previously led the security team for Lula's 2022 presidential campaign and for then president-elect Lula's transition team. He had earlier led the security team for Dilma Rousseff's 2010 presidential campaign. As Special Secretary for Security for Major Events, he coordinated security for the 2014 FIFA World Cup and the 2016 Rio Olympic and Paralympic Games. He also served as executive secretary of the Community of Police of the Americas (Ameripol), an organization focused on police cooperation among countries in the Americas. He was kept in the post by subsequent Ministers of Justice Ricardo Lewandowski and Wellington Lima e Silva.

On 8 September 2026, Rodrigues was preventively removed from his post amid a scandal implicating the Brazilian Supreme Federal Court. His name had surfaced in messages from Banco Master owner Daniel Vorcaro to a contact linked to Justice Alexandre de Moraes, in which Vorcaro described a cordial relationship with Rodrigues and speculated that pressure to block a potential plea deal may have come from Rodrigues or people close to him. Justice André Mendonça, who said he had been unlawfully monitored by the Federal Police, ordered Rodrigues's removal, a decision the STF's Second Panel later upheld by majority vote. The following day, the Court's president, Justice Edson Fachin, overturned the Mendonça's decision and reinstated Andrei to the position.
