= João Doria =

Brazilian politician, businessman, and journalist

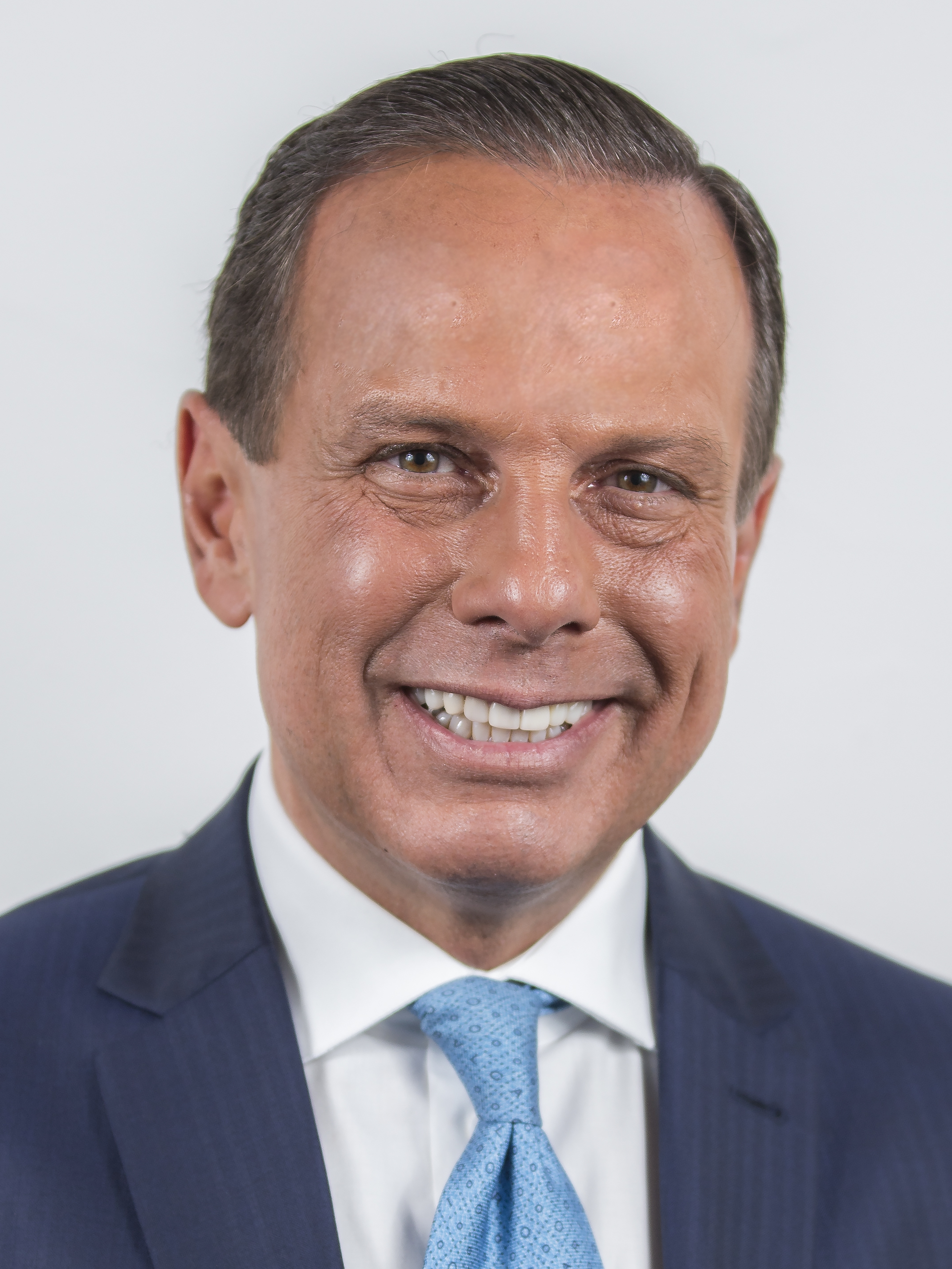
- Doria in 2019

Governor of São Paulo
- In office 1 January 2019 – 1 April 2022
- Vice Governor: Rodrigo Garcia
- Preceded by: Márcio França
- Succeeded by: Rodrigo Garcia

Mayor of São Paulo
- In office 1 January 2017 – 6 April 2018
- Vice Mayor: Bruno Covas
- Preceded by: Fernando Haddad
- Succeeded by: Bruno Covas

Personal details
- Born: João Agripino da Costa Doria Júnior; 16 December 1957 (age 68) São Paulo, Brazil
- Party: PSDB (2001–2022)
- Spouse: Bia Bettanin (m. 1987)
- Children: 3
- Education: Armando Alvares Penteado Foundation (BA)

João Agripino da Costa Doria Júnior (Brazilian Portuguese pronunciation: [ʒuˈɐ̃w aɡɾiˈpinu da ˈkɔstɐ ˈdɔɾi.ɐ ˈʒuni.oʁ]; born 16 December 1957) is a Brazilian politician, businessman and journalist who served as Governor of São Paulo, from January 2019 to April 2022. He previously served as the 52nd Mayor of São Paulo from 1 January 2017 to his resignation on 16 December 2018. He was the first mayor in 24 years to be elected in the first round. Doria was a member of the Brazilian Social Democracy Party (PSDB), and is known for having hosted the TV show O Aprendiz, a Brazilian version of The Apprentice. Doria resigned the office of mayor in April 2018 to run for Governor of São Paulo.

== Early life ==
João Agripino da Costa Doria Júnior was born in São Paulo, the son of an advertising professional and federal deputy João Doria and businesswoman Maria Sylvia Vieira de Moraes Dias. From his paternal family, he is a descendant of the aristocratic Doria family of Genoa, specifically the Costa Doria Family branch, that migrated to Colonial Brazil in 1549, and become one of the richest in Bahia, owing its wealth to the ownership of Engenhos and slaves. With the economic stagnation of Northeastern Brazil in the 18th century, the family lost most of its former wealth. His great uncle was the jurist and life-long abolitionist Ruy Barbosa.

Following the 1964 Brazilian coup d'état, Doria's father was ousted from the Chamber of Deputies for supporting leftist president João Goulart. Doria's family had to take refuge in the embassy of Communist Czechoslovakia. Though Doria himself, his brother and mother returned to Brazil two years later, his father had to remain in exile for the next ten years. Upon returning to Brazil, Maria Sylvia established a diaper factory in Pinheiros and the family made their home in the upscale Higienópolis neighborhood. In 1974, Doria's father returned to Brazil as commercial director of an Argentine wine exporting company. Two months after his father's return, Doria's mother Maria Sylvia died of pneumonia.

== Education and early career ==
Doria began working at Rede Tupi at the age of 18 while he studied social communication at Fundação Armando Alvares Penteado (FAAP). After graduating from FAAP, Doria was director of the MGM advertising agency. Doria headed the federal tourism agency Embratur from 1986 to 1988 during the presidency of José Sarney.

== Business career ==
In 1992 he founded Grupo Doria, a group of six companies. He would later create the LIDE business group in 2003 that brought businessmen and politicians in Brazil together. By 2017, LIDE had 1,700 members that represented 54% of Brazil's gross domestic product.

=== LIDE – Group of Business Leaders ===
LIDE is Brazil's largest networking company, uniting national and multinational businesses with annual gross revenue equivalent to or greater than R$ 200 million (US$ 43 million). The company hosts frequent forums to promote economic and social growth via self-initiative. As IPO speculations arose in 2019 during an event held in New York and organized by Daniel Vorcaro of Banco Master, LIDE was valued at around R$1 billion.

=== Wealth ===
According to financial filings with the Superior Electoral Court of Brazil during the 2016 election, Doria's net worth was valued at R$179.7 million (US$51 million in 2016 dollars). Doria's recent declared net worth is R$ 189.9 million (US$ 46.8 in 2018 currency), according to a list of assets officially published by the Superior Electoral Court during the 2018 gubernatorial elections.

== Political career ==
=== Mayor of São Paulo ===
As a mayoral candidate for São Paulo, Brazil's largest city, Doria received support following discontent with the Workers' Party amid the Lava Jato scandal. He was compared to United States politician Donald Trump while campaigning since they both appeared on The Apprentice and promoted themselves as businessmen instead of politicians.

On 12 January 2017, Doria was elected the mayor of São Paulo. While mayor of São Paulo, he supported cutting regulations on inspecting possible slave labor conditions, stating "You can't just tear up a businessman's history due to a tax inspector's notice. ... This even protects the worker" and advocating for reports to be publicized only by the Minister of Labor. According to The Intercept, lawyers for Doria would notify Facebook users to remove content that possibly criticized the mayor during his tenure.

=== Governor of São Paulo ===
Doria became the governor of the state of São Paulo, the country's most populous state, on 12 January 2019.

Throughout 2020, Doria worked with the Butantã Institute to develop an effective vaccine against COVID-19. In partnership with Sinovac, the Butantã Institute developed CoronaVac, which, according to studies already presented, will produce vaccines in São Paulo. The National Health Surveillance Agency (Anvisa), after a period of analysis, approved the vaccine on 17 January 2021 for emergency use in Brazil.

=== Electoral results ===
Year	Election	Party	Office	Coalition	Partners	Party	Votes	Percent	Result
2016	Municipal Election of São Paulo	PSDB	Mayor	Acelera SP (PSDB, PP, PSB, DEM, PTN, PMN, PPS, PHS, PV, PSL, PMB, PRP, PTC, PTdoB)	Bruno Covas	PSDB	3,085,187	53.29%	Elected
2018	State Elections of São Paulo	PSDB	Governor	AceleraSP (PSDB, DEM, PSD, PP, PRB, PTC)	Rodrigo Garcia	DEM	6,431,555	31.77%	Runoff
2018	State Elections of São Paulo	PSDB	Governor	AceleraSP (PSDB, DEM, PSD, PP, PRB, PTC)	Rodrigo Garcia	DEM	10,990,350	51.75%	Elected

2021 PSDB presidential primary
Party	Candidate	Votes	%
PSDB	João Doria	17,470	53.99
PSDB	Eduardo Leite	11,295	44.66
PSDB	Arthur Virgílio Neto	427	1.35

== Political positions ==
Doria opposes abortion with an exception to victims of rape and is against decriminalization of drugs. He supports reduction of the age of criminal responsibility in Brazil and political and electoral reform. He has also expressed support for Operation Car Wash, stating that it has "fundamental importance" to the nation. He has also been nominated by PSDB to represent the party in the 2022 Brazilian presidential election, but was later removed by his own party.

== Personal life ==
Doria married plastic artist Beatriz Maria Bettanin in 1987, with the couple having three children together. Their family lives in the Jardim Europa neighborhood of São Paulo in what is recognized among the largest mansions in the city.

== Awards and recognition ==
Doria was elected as one of the 100 most influential personalities of 2012 by ISTOÉ magazine, and one of the 100 most reputable leaders in Brazil in 2014, according to a survey published in the country by Exame magazine.

Political offices
Preceded by Fernando Haddad	Mayor of São Paulo; 2017–2018	Succeeded by Bruno Covas
Preceded by Márcio França	Governor of São Paulo; 2019–2023	Succeeded by Rodrigo Garcia
Party political offices
Preceded by José Serra	PSDB nominee for Mayor of São Paulo; 2016	Succeeded by Bruno Covas
Preceded by Geraldo Alckmin	PSDB nominee for Governor of São Paulo; 2018	Succeeded by Rodrigo Garcia
