= Total Badass =

2010 American documentary by Bob Ray

- Directed by: Bob Ray
- Produced by: Bob Ray; Mia Cevallos; Kera Dacy
- Edited by: Bob Ray; Andrew Segovia
- Music by: The Crack Pipes; Fruntbutt; BFE; Gun Totin' Meateaters; Migas; Honky; Wine and Revolution
- Release date: May 19, 2010
- Running time: 91 minutes
- Country: United States
- Language: English

Total Badass is a 2010 documentary by American director and producer Bob Ray that first premiered on May 19, 2010. Forgoing the usual route of signing a deal with a film distributor, the film was taken on 50+ city tour dubbed the Badass Film Tour where Bob Ray and Chad Holt spent eleven weeks touring around and attending screenings at different venues around the United States and Canada, along with some of the filmmaker's other independent films; such as the 2007's documentary Hell on Wheels and several short animated films created under the banner CrashToons.

== Plot summary ==
Bob Ray takes you on an outrageous and hilariously seedy adventure into the Austin underground music and arts scene via wild man-about-town, social deviant, musical/stunt performer, sex fanatic, Guinea pig enthusiast, writer-publisher, father, weed dealing felon, hip-hop impresario, trashcan jumper and local beloved weirdo Chad Holt. Exploiting life as his unwitting canvas, Chad's take-no-prisoners artistry assaults funny bones, political correctness, and common decency as he strives to leave a creative imprint on the planet. Strap in for the riotous ride and follow this icon of the Austin counterculture as he blazes through his final year of felony probation, living his own brand of civil disobedience while manning the helm of a life-altering family crisis and going out smokin!

== Critical review ==
Total Badass has received generally positive reviews. Despite many scenes of explicit behavior by its subject, it is considered an admirable movie of "life on the artistic and social fringe, and a thriller."

== Cast ==
- Chad Holt
