= Look (2009 film) =

2009 short film

Look is a 2009 short film written and directed by Ryan Pickett. The movie features Starina Johnson, John Ferguson, Theresa Meeker Pickett and Ryan Pickett.

== Plot ==
When a model walks into a restaurant, barmaid Emma fantasizes. She glamorizes the life of the model. As the imaginary plain man John, Emma follows the model onto the set of a photo shoot. Escapism is a short relief for Emma who must eventually face her mundane life.

== Cast ==
- Starina Johnson as Emma
- John Ferguson as John
- Theresa Meeker as Supermodel
- Alison Parson as Hair and Makeup Artist
- Ryan Pickett as Photographer

== Accolades ==
Year	Award	Category	Result
2009	Accolade Competition	Award of Merit	Won
2011	Best Shorts Competition	Award of Merit	Won
2011	California Film Awards	Gold Award	Won
2012	Honolulu Film Awards	Silver Lei Award	Won
2012	Los Angeles Movie Awards	Best Original Score & Award of Excellence	Won

== Premiere and distribution ==
Look premiered at the Regal Cinemas in Green Hills, Tennessee in Spring 2009. The short film was distributed on online video streaming services such as IndieFlix and Indiepix Films.
