= Nicky Gogan =

Irish film director, producer and editor

- Education: National College of Art and Design
- Occupations: Film director, producer, editor
- Years active: 1999–present
- Known for: Founder of the Darklight Film Festival; co-founder of Still Films
- Notable work: Seaview (2008); Build Something Modern (2011)

Nicky Gogan is an Irish film director, producer and editor. She founded the Darklight Film Festival, a digital and experimental film festival in Dublin, in 1999, and in 2007 co-founded the production company Still Films with Maya Derrington and Paul Rowley. She is best known for the documentaries Seaview (2008) and Build Something Modern (2011), both co-directed with Rowley, and as producer of Pyjama Girls (2010) and Lost in France (2016).

== Early life and education ==
Gogan graduated from the National College of Art and Design in Dublin, and completed the European Audiovisual Entrepreneurs (EAVE) producers' programme in 2008.

== Career ==
=== Darklight Film Festival ===
Gogan founded the Darklight Festival in 1999, which Still Films describes as Ireland's first digital arts festival. She served as the festival's director through the 2000s.

=== Still Films ===
In 2007 Gogan co-founded Still Films, a production company based in Dublin and New York, with Maya Derrington and Paul Rowley. The company produces feature films, documentaries, animation and artists' films, and works collectively, with its members producing and editing one another's projects.

=== Directing ===
Gogan's first feature documentary, Seaview (2008), co-directed with Rowley, examined the lives of asylum seekers housed at the former Butlin's holiday camp at Mosney, County Meath. It was nominated for Best Feature Documentary at the Irish Film and Television Awards in 2009.

Their second feature, Build Something Modern (2011), told the story of Irish architects whose modernist designs for hospitals, schools and churches were commissioned by Catholic missionaries in Africa from the 1940s onwards, drawing heavily on reworked archive material. The film won the Dublin Film Critics' Circle Michael Dwyer Discovery Award at the 2011 Dublin International Film Festival and received a cinema release in Ireland.

In 2012 Gogan co-directed The Swimmer with visual artist Fergal McCarthy, a film commissioned by the Science Gallery, Dublin, for its Surface Tension exhibition, which later travelled to the Eyebeam gallery in New York.

=== Producing ===
As a producer, Gogan's credits include Maya Derrington's documentary Pyjama Girls (2010), which was nominated for an Irish Film and Television Award; the racing thriller Black Ice (2013), directed by Johnny Gogan, which she co-produced; and the documentary Last Hijack (2014), on which she was a co-producer and which won an Emmy Award in the online non-fiction category in 2015.

She also produced We, The Masses (2011), a 13-minute stop-motion short directed by Eoghan Kidney and based on ten years of drawings by the American artist Robyn O'Neil. The project began after O'Neil and Kidney met at Werner Herzog's Rogue Film School and was funded through the Frameworks animation scheme with support from the Irish Film Board, RTÉ and the Arts Council of Ireland.

She produced Niall McCann's Lost in France (2016), an Irish–UK co-production with Edge City Films about the Glasgow independent music scene, which premiered at the Edinburgh International Film Festival and was released in cinemas in the UK and Ireland by Curzon Artificial Eye. She also produced Paul Rowley's short documentary The Red Tree (2018), about Italian gay men exiled to island confinement under Mussolini's Fascist regime.

In 2020 she was selected as one of the MIPTV/Midem "Producers to Watch".

== Filmography ==
Year	Title	Role	Notes
2008	Seaview	Director, producer, editor	Co-directed with Paul Rowley
2010	Pyjama Girls	Producer	Directed by Maya Derrington
2011	We, The Masses	Producer	Directed by Eoghan Kidney; animated short based on artwork by Robyn O'Neil
2011	Build Something Modern	Director, producer, editor	Co-directed with Paul Rowley
2012	The Swimmer	Director	Co-directed with Fergal McCarthy; short
2013	Black Ice	Co-producer	Directed by Johnny Gogan
2014	Last Hijack	Co-producer	
2016	Lost in France	Producer, editor	Directed by Niall McCann
2017	Kevin Roche: The Quiet Architect	Co-producer	
2018	The Red Tree	Producer	Directed by Paul Rowley; short

== Awards and nominations ==
Year	Award	Work	Result
2009	Irish Film and Television Award – Best Feature Documentary	Seaview	Nominated
2011	Dublin Film Critics' Circle Michael Dwyer Discovery Award	Build Something Modern	Won
2015	Emmy Award – Online non-fiction	Last Hijack (co-producer)	Won
