= List of Romanian films of 2014 =

The Romanian film industry produced over thirty feature films in 2014. This article fully lists all non-pornographic films, including short films, that had a release date in that year and which were at least partly made by Romania. It does not include films first released in previous years that had release dates in 2014.
Also included is an overview of the major events in Romanian film, including film festivals and awards ceremonies, as well as lists of those films that have been particularly well received, both critically and financially.

== Major releases ==
Opening		Title	Cast and Crew	Studio	Genre(s)	Ref.
F E B R U A R Y	7	Vampire Academy	Director: Mark Waters; Cast: Zoey Deutch, Lucy Fry, Danila Kozlovsky, Gabriel Byrne, Dominic Sherwood, Olga Kurylenko, Sarah Hyland	The Weinstein Company	Fantasy; Horror	
M A R C H	7	Closer to the Moon	Director: Nae Caranfil; Cast: Vera Farmiga, Mark Strong, Harry Lloyd	Mandragora Movies	Comedy; Drama	
J U N E	24	So Bright Is the View	Directors: Joël Florescu, Michaël Florescu; Cast: Bianca Valea, Ovidu Niculescu		Drama	
J U L Y	3	Desert Dancer	Director: Richard Raymond; Cast: Reece Ritchie, Freida Pinto, Nazanin Boniadi, Tom Cullen, Marama Corlett, Akin Gazi	Relativity Media	Biography; Drama	
S E P T E M B E R	4	Kira Kiralina	Director: Dan Pița; Cast: Florin Zamfirescu, Iulia Dumitru, Ștefan Iancu, Corneliu Ulici, Iulia Cirstea	Castel Film Studio	Drama	

== Notable deaths ==
Month	Date	Name	Age	Nationality	Profession	Notable films
June	8	Veronica Lazăr	75	Romanian-Italian	Actress	The Sheltering Sky; La Luna
June	11	Gilles Ségal	82	Romanian-French	Actor	Topkapi; The Madwoman of Chaillot

== See also ==
- 2014 in film
- 2014 in Romania
- Cinema of Romania
- List of 2014 box office number-one films in Romania
- List of Romanian submissions for the Academy Award for Best Foreign Language Film
