= Seaview (film) =

- Directed by: Nicky Gogan; Paul Rowley
- Produced by: Maya Derrington; Nicky Gogan; Paul Rowley
- Cinematography: Paul Rowley
- Edited by: Nicky Gogan; Paul Rowley
- Music by: Dennis McNulty
- Production company: Still Films
- Distributed by: Arsenal Institut for Film and Video Art (Germany); IndiePix Films (North America)
- Release date: 4 September 2007 (Stranger than Fiction Festival)
- Running time: 81 minutes
- Country: Ireland
- Language: English
- Budget: €90,000 (estimated)

Seaview is a 2007 documentary film directed by Nicky Gogan and Paul Rowley. The film chronicles the lives of a group of asylum seekers living in the former Butlin's Holiday Camp at Mosney, Ireland. The film takes an innovative approach to the use to sound and image in telling the stories of the Mosney residents. This has much to do with the past work of the directors, which has been focused on video art and gallery installation projects.

The film premiered in the Forum section of the 2008 Berlin Film Festival and has since shown at many festivals internationally, including Hot Docs in Toronto, Silverdocs, Sheffield Doc-Fest, and the Rio de Janeiro and São Paulo Film Festivals. The film was nominated in the best feature documentary category at the 2009 Irish Film and Television Awards (IFTAs).

== Production ==
Directors Nicky Gogan and Paul Rowley first visited the camp as children when Mosney was run as a holiday centre. They returned to the camp in February 2004 to begin a period of research with the residents at the camp. Originally the intention was to write a script for a drama based on the idea of flotels - container ships holding asylum seekers to be floated off the coast while the asylum seekers were being processed. The filmmakers decided soon after meeting the residents in Mosney to change direction and make a documentary. They began to run a series of audio and video workshops in the camp with the residents, including concerts with a rap group formed at Mosney, audio workshops with the women's group, and community radio broadcasts.

The filmmakers lived at Mosney over a three-year period, meeting with asylum seekers at different stages in the process and conducting interviews. The film discusses the difficulties that arise when people are forced to live for an extended period of time in within a system that is processing their case. Deprived of the right to work, the residents are put on a system called Direct Provision, whereby they are fed and housed by the Irish government, and given a small amount of cash (19 Euro per week at the time of filming).

== Reviews ==
The film received a positive reception upon its premiere at the Berlin Film Festival. The Sunday Times said this ‘innovative documentary about asylum seekers held at a former Butlin’s holiday camp packs a real punch’. The Wall Street Journal called Seaview a ‘powerful documentary’ and said that ‘the filmmakers are able to combine the abstract quality of a video installation with the urgent stories of the people they interview’. The Village wrote: "While Seaview tells some grueling stories of exile, this film is also a beautiful portrayal of humanity". The Sheffield Doc/Fest catalogue said ‘As far as documentaries go about asylum seekers and the immigration debate, no other is as human and evocative as Seaview’, while the Silverdocs Catalogue said 'Directors Paul Rowley and Nicky Gogan’s approach to storytelling is solemn and innovative. This lyrical and deliberately displacing film captures the irony of a space repurposed and stories of migration put on hold.'
