= IndiePix Films =

American film distribution and online streaming service

- Company type: Private
- Industry: Distribution
- Founded: 2004; 22 years ago
- Headquarters: New York, USA
- Number of locations: 1
- Area served: Worldwide
- Key people: Barnet Liberman, Bob Alexander
- Services: Independent Film Distribution, Film Promotion and Marketing, Online Streaming Services, Short Film Distribution
- Revenue: Private
- Website: www.indiepixfilms.com

IndiePix Films, Inc is an independent film distribution and online streaming service based in New York City.

IndiePix Unlimited, the company's subscription-streaming service, uses Streamhoster to deliver the desktop version for the service, and Ireland-based DMD Max for its mobile content.

== History ==
Founded in 2004 by Barnet Liberman and Bob Alexander, currently the company's chairman and president respectively, IndiePix Films' business purpose is to organize, create, implement and exploit a commercial platform for the distribution of independent films. It owns a catalogue of thousands films spanning multiple genres acquired on the international festival circuit, including Cannes, Venice, Locarno, Tribeca, SXSW and Rotterdam.

On January 26, 2016, the company launched its subscription-streaming service, IndiePix Unlimited.

In December 2016, IndiePix Films teamed with Amazon Channels, opening up access for Prime members on the PlayStation and Roku platforms, along with Amazon Fire TV products.

== Filmography (selected) ==
Year	Title	Notes
2005	Black Sun	Premiered at the Toronto International Film Festival
2005	Disarm	Selected at the Newport Beach Film Festival
2005	Nicky's Game	Short Film; Premiered at the New York Television Festival
2006	Toots	Premiered at the Tribeca Film Festival
2006	Williamsburg	Selected at the Syracuse International Film Festival
2007	Audience of One	Premiered at the South by Southwest Film Festival
2007	Hell on Wheels	Premiered at the South by Southwest Film Festival
2007	Road to the Big Leagues	Premiered at the Independent Film Festival Boston
2007	Seaview	Premiered at the Berlin Film Festival
2008	Dominick Dunne: After the Party	Premiered at the Melbourne International Film Festival
2008	Encirclement	Premiered at the Berlin Film Festival
2008	The End of America	
2008	In a Dream	Premiered at the South by Southwest Film Festival
2008	Nerdcore for Life	Premiered at the Wisconsin Film Festival
2008	Who Is KK Downey?	Premiered at the Cinequest Film Festival
2009	Big River Man	Premiered at the Sundance Film Festival
2009	Estilo Hip Hop	
2009	Entre nos	Premiered at the Tribeca Film Festival
2009	Look	Short Film; Selected at the Honolulu Film Festival
2009	Women Without Men	Premiered at the Venice Film Festival
2010	All My Friends Are Funeral Singers	Premiered at the Sundance Film Festival
2011	Everything Strange and New	Premiered at the Sundance Film Festival
2011	That Girl in Yellow Boots	Premiered at the Toronto Film Festival
2013	Red Thread: The Prisoner and the Painter	Short Film; Premiered at the Big Apple Film Festival
2014	A Blast	Premiered at the Locarno International Film Festival
2014	Queen of Diamonds	Short Film
2014	Red Leaves	Premiered at the Rotterdam International Film Festival
2014	So Bright Is the View	Premiered at the Moscow International Film Festival
2014	The Winter	Premiered at the Thessaloniki International Film Festival
2015	#artoffline	Selected at the Rotterdam International Film Festival
2015	Algún lugar	Selected at the Miami International Film Festival
2015	Millie & the Lords	Selected at the Philadelphia Latino Film Festival
2015	Mouton	Premiered at the Locarno International Film Festival
2015	Night in the Wild Garden	Animated Short Film
2015	Roaring Abyss	Selected at the Rotterdam International Film Festival
2015	La Vie de Jean-Marie	Selected at the Rotterdam International Film Festival
2016	Candy Apple	Selected at the New York's Winter Film Awards 2016
2016	Oncle Bernard	Selected at the Rotterdam International Film Festival
2017	Snowflake	Short Film; Premiered at the HollyShorts Film Festival
2019	Scam Republique	Feature Film; Premiered at the New York Hip-Hop Film Festival
2019	Yesterday Was a Lie	Tenth anniversary re-release Acquired from Entertainment One
