= Alison Parson =

American singer-songwriter

- Born: 1984 (age 41–42); Corinth, Mississippi, U.S.
- Origin: Nashville, Tennessee, U.S.
- Genres: Country
- Occupations: Singer, songwriter
- Instrument: Vocals
- Years active: 2000s–present

Alison Parson (born 1984) is an American country singer and songwriter based in Nashville, Tennessee.

== Early life ==
Parson hails from Corinth, Mississippi, where she attended Alcorn Central High School, graduating in 2002. She received a Bachelor of Arts degree in Recording Industry/Music Business and a minor in marketing from Middle Tennessee State University.

Parson has helped raise over $30,000 for Vanderbilt Children's Hospital and has spent countless hours speaking to children about the importance of believing in themselves and their dreams.

== Singing career ==
Parson has performed at the Liberty Bowl with blues artist B.B. King. She sang for mass at the Notre Dame Cathedral in Paris, France. In addition, she played Sandy in the production of Grease at Eurodisney. She was a finalist in the Next American Superstar Competition. She has opened for artists including Vince Gill, Amy Grant, Little Big Town, Linda Davis, and The Oak Ridge Boys.

Parson's first disc was labeled Alison Rhea, as she initially debuted with her middle name, soon after changing to her full name, Alison Parson.

== Critical response ==
Author Colleen Creamer, in Her Nashville magazine, says, "To hear Parson sing is impressive. Not only is her songwriting really good, but her voice has a kind of phrasing and vocal timbre that is both sophisticated and authentic, admirable for someone 25 years old."

== Awards ==
Parson was voted one of Nashville's Best Singer-Songwriters by Village Voice Media-owned Nashville Scene in 2011.

== Film career ==
Parson has appeared in movies, such as her part as a make-up artist preparing a model for a photo shoot in avant-garde short film Look, which won an Award of Merit for best student film in the 2009 Accolade Competition, Award of Merit for best experimental film in the 2011 Best Shorts Competition], Gold Award at the 2011 California Film Awards, Silver Lei Award at the 2012 Honolulu Film Awards, Award of Excellence and Best Original Score in 2012 Los Angeles Movie Awards.

Parson is also a professional make-up artist who has done make-up for celebrities, such as Paris Hilton and Nicole Richie for The Simple Life.
