= Nicky's Game =

2005 short film

Nicky’s Game
- Directed by: John-Luke Montias
- Written by: Peter Alson
- Produced by: Matthew Parker; Matthew Strauss
- Starring: John Ventimiglia; Burt Young; Alexie Gilmore; Lev Gorn; Bill Tangradi
- Cinematography: George Gibson
- Edited by: Michiel Pilgram; Tony Borden
- Music by: Ed Tomney
- Production companies: SpaceTime Films; LaSalleHolland
- Distributed by: IndiePix Films
- Release date: September 29, 2005 (NYTVF)
- Running time: 21 minutes
- Country: United States
- Language: English
- Budget: $100,000 (est.)

Nicky's Game is a 2005 American short film, originally developed and produced as an independent television pilot, based on Peter Alson's 1996 memoir Confessions of an Ivy League Bookie. The film was shot on 16mm in New York City and premiered in 2005 at the inaugural New York Television Festival. It became an official selection in 2006 of the Vail Film Festival and CineVegas before IndiePix Films released it on DVD/VOD.

WeShort re-released Nicky's Game in fall 2025 to coincide with the film's 20th anniversary.

== Plot summary ==
Nicky Singer is a down-on-his-luck Brooklyn native who has parlayed his Yale education into a job eking out a living as a professional poker player. Using his wits to navigate the seedy world of underground poker, he must balance his own interests with those of his father, a retiree whose own gambling debts have pushed him to the brink of eviction. In a struggle to keep his head above water, Nicky encounters a diverse group of wannabe mobsters, thugs, and other eccentric characters.

== Cast ==
- John Ventimiglia as Nicky Singer
- Burt Young as Leo Singer
- Alexie Gilmore as Tatiana
- Lev Gorn as Syrian Sal
- Bill Tangradi as DeeJay
