= Road to the Big Leagues =

- Directed by: Jared Goodman
- Produced by: Eran Lobel; Jared Goodman
- Cinematography: Jared Goodman
- Edited by: Ryan Little
- Music by: George Langford
- Production company: ELEMENT productions
- Distributed by: IndiePix Films
- Release date: June 2007 (Boston International Film Festival)
- Running time: 53 minutes
- Country: United States
- Languages: English; Spanish

Road to the Big Leagues (Spanish: Rumbo a las Grandes Ligas) is a 2007 independent documentary film. This film follows children from the Dominican Republic who rely on baseball as a way out of poverty and struggle.

== Festivals ==
- Independent Film Festival of Boston 2007 (Boston, United States)
- Los Angeles Latino International Film Festival 2007 (Los Angeles, California)
- New York Latino International Film Festival 2007 (New York, United States)
