= Hillbilly Doomsday =

2004 film

Movie poster for Hillbilly Doomsday

Hillbilly Doomsday is a 2004 film by director Bob Ray, and stars Jerry "Toe" Clark

== Synopsis ==
Based on a true story, Hillbilly Doomsday is a tale of Texas' first murder of the new millennium. With Y2K paranoia at a fevered pitch, two drunken hillbilly brothers hole up in their wooded shack and await the year 2000. The second hand strikes midnight, the power shuts off and suddenly the brothers' nightmarish Y2K fears are realized. Certain that the apocalypse is upon them they hastily formulate a plan to prepare for the bleak and uncompromising future. What follows is the brutally funny, heinously violent and nearly botched murder of their survivalist cousin who they kill in an effort to steal his guns and provisions and to make ready for the new post-apocalyptic world of the future.

== Production ==
Hillbilly Doomsday was shot in Austin, Texas in early 2001. Soon after production wrapped, the footage was lost and remained in limbo for over two years. After re-discovering the master tapes in late 2003, the film was cut together as intended and was released.

== Reviews ==
Karl Beck wrote in IndieWire that the film "based on a true story, begins as a joke but quickly escalates to an intense thriller as two Texans believe that Y2K has actually occurred and that it is essential for them to procure firearms." Hank Sartin wrote in the Chicago Reader that "Hillbilly Doomsday borrows from ultracheap 70s horror but is too broadly drawn".

== Screenings ==
- The 11th Annual New York Underground Film Festival (2004)
- The 11th Annual Chicago Underground Film Festival (2004)
- International Competition at CinemaTexas 9 (2004)
