= Disarm (film) =

- Directed by: Brian Liu; Mary Wareham
- Produced by: Amy O'Byrne
- Edited by: Arni Hassen Sveinsson
- Music by: Brendan Canty
- Distributed by: IndiePix Films
- Release date: 2005
- Running time: 67 minutes
- Countries: United States; Afghanistan; Belarus; Bosnia and Herzegovina; Burma; Colombia; Iraq
- Language: English

Disarm is a documentary film which spans a dozen countries to look at how, despite a global ban, millions of antipersonnel landmines continue to claim victims daily in more than eighty countries. Defined as a conventional weapon, landmines inflict destruction upon civilian populations for decades after the initial conflict has ended. Disarm juxtaposes government and public opinion- that of diplomats, mine victims, deminers, soldiers, campaigners and aid workers- to explore the issues that both hinder and further the case against the weapon. Visually stunning, Disarm features harrowing footage smuggled out of isolated nation of Burma, scenes from war-ravaged Colombia and Iraq, never-before-seen helmet camera footage shot by Afghan and Bosnian deminers, unprecedented access into warehouses stockpiling millions of Soviet-made mines, and insightful comments by outspoken Nobel Peace Laureate Jody Williams. Looking beyond landmines, Disarm offers a contemporary, intelligent and critical investigation into how weapons systems, war, and the way it is waged are being redefined in the 21st century with devastating consequences.
