= Bob Ray =

American filmmaker, first active 1994

Bob Ray is an American independent filmmaker based in Austin, Texas. He founded CrashCam Films.

== Biography ==
In 1994 Ray founded the production company CrashCam Films. His first productions were narrative Super 8 mm films and music videos. Ray's in-camera-edited Super 8 short film, Sweet Sweetroll's BaadAsssss Spin, appeared in indie producer John Pierson's Split/Screen, on the Independent Film Channel and Bravo through indie producer John Pierson's program Split/Screen.

Ray made his feature film debut with the rock 'n' roll stoner film Rock Opera (1999). The film gained cult recognition and was nominated in 2003 for High Times magazine's Stony Film Award.

Ray has produced and directed several music videos, including a video for the song "Fried Chicken and Coffee" (1998) by Nashville Pussy, which was nominated at the 41st Annual Grammy Awards for Grammy Award for Best Metal Performance. Other bands he has created music videos for include The Riverboat Gamblers, The Polyphonic Spree, The Black Eyed Peas, Eels, Jerry Cantrell, Blur, Modest Mouse and Hank Williams III.

In 2007, Ray completed work on Hell on Wheels, a documentary film about the resurgence of all-girl roller derby in Texas. That year, Ray launched CrashToons, the animation arm of CrashCam Films, producing animated short films. CrashToons titles include APESH!T, Platypus Rex, Rooster Lollipop and others. His animated shorts have been shown at film festivals, on SuperDeluxe.com and on Playboy.com.

In 2010, Ray premiered Total Badass, his documentary film about Austin-based Chad Holt's struggles to remain clean and sober while on probation.

== Filmography ==
- The Adventures of Donald Starkland (short) (1994)
- Cocaine Ninja (short) (1996)
- Night of the Kung Fu Bastards from Hell! (short) (1997)
- Six Pack of Wup Ass (short) (1997)
- Sweet Sweetroll's BaadAsssss Spin (short) (1997)
- Rock Opera (2001)
- Wrecked (short) (2002)
- Hillbilly Doomsday (short) (2004)
- APESH!T (a.k.a. Ape Shit) (animated series, 2006–2008)
- Hell on Wheels (2007)
- Platypus Rex (animated series; 2008–2010)
- Total Badass (documentary; 2010)
