= Chad Holt =

American actor and writer (1972–2019)

- Born: October 3, 1972; Galveston, Texas
- Died: August 18, 2019 (aged 46); Austin, Texas
- Education: Bachelor of Arts in Sociology
- Alma mater: The University of Texas at Austin
- Occupations: Writer, Actor, Musician
- Notable work: Subject of the movie Total Badass
- Criminal charge: Trademark counterfeiting
- Criminal penalty: 5 years probation
- Criminal status: completed
- Children: 2
- Website: archived official website

Chad Jeremy Holt (October 3, 1972 – August 18, 2019) was an American writer, actor, and performer in Austin, Texas. He was the subject of the independent documentary film Total Badass by director Bob Ray about his struggles with drug use and the criminal justice system.

== SXSW wristbands ==
Holt first came to notoriety when he was arrested and then convicted of counterfeiting wristbands to the annual South by Southwest Music Festival (SXSW). He avoided a prison sentence by agreeing to be placed on community supervision for five years.

== Total Badass ==
Holt's struggles to remain clean and sober while on probation for the counterfeiting charges is the central topic in the documentary film Total Badass by independent filmmaker Bob Ray.

== Acting ==
In addition to his writing, singing, and publishing activities, Holt also acted in movies that featured the Austin area as their backdrops. He was in Ray's first film, Total Badass, and he was cast in the multi-director Slacker remake of the same name, Slacker 2011. Ray and Holt also filmed commercials for Holt's non-profit, Drunk Drivers of Texas, and for his attorney friend, Adam Reposa, for whom Holt worked as a legal assistant.
