= Ryan Pickett (filmmaker) =

American filmmaker

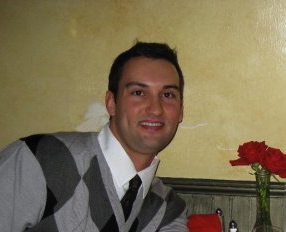
- Born: Ryan Pickett; Baltimore, MD, United States of America

Ryan Pickett is an American film director, writer & producer, and television actor.

== Ryan Pickett Productions ==
In 2008, Ryan created Ryan Pickett Productions. He submitted a business plan for a feature film production company along with his first short movie, You Only Loved Me Twice, and was selected as a top 5 finalist for the Global Entrepreneurship Week film entrepreneurship competition ‘The Race to BE’, hosted by media mogul Russell Simmons at Sony Picture Studios in Los Angeles in 2008.

== Films ==
=== Look ===
Ryan directed, produced and co-wrote the short film Look, which won an Award of Merit in the 2009 Accolade Competition for student films, an Award of Merit in the 2011 Best Shorts Competition for experimental films, a Gold Award in the 2011 California Film Awards, a Silver Lei Award in the 2012 Honolulu Film Awards, as well as Best Original Score and an Award of Excellence in the 2012 Los Angeles Movie Awards. Ryan directed Look using the Red One 4K in 2009. Look was received well by critics

"I think it is better that folks see it and come to their own conclusions. Just as beauty is in the eye of the beholder, the relevance, resonance and power of LOOK resides entirely in the eye of the person watching it."

— Mark Bell, Film Threat

"Look was "directed with an exceptionally keen eye for detail and color"

— Matthew Saliba, Rogue Cinema

Currently, Look has distribution through IndieFlix and IndiePix online video streaming services.

=== You Only Loved Me Twice ===
The first film that Ryan made, You Only Loved Me Twice, as well as Ryan's business proposal helped him beat out thousands of others across the world to earn him a top five finalist spot in the showcase event for the USA during Global Entrepreneurship Week, which was a film entrepreneurship competition, the Race to BE, hosted by Russell Simmons at Sony Picture Studios in Los Angeles. In an interview with Nashville Business Journal Ryan said, You Only Loved Me Twice is "a beginning film, but I did decide to go over the top with it". You Only Loved Me Twice currently has distribution with IndieFlix online video streaming service.

== Filmography ==
=== Film director ===
- Look (short, 2009)
- You Only Loved Me Twice (short, 2008)

=== TV Actor ===
- "Arrested Development (TV series)" season 2, episode 7 "Switch Hitter", played the Young Oscar Bluth
- Strong Medicine 22 episodes from 2005–2006, played the Young Handsome Doctor

== Awards and nominations ==
Year	Association	Category	Work	Result	Ref.
2012	Los Angeles Movie Awards	Best Original Score & Award of Excellence	Look	Won	
2012	Honolulu Film Awards	Silver Lei Award	Look	Won	
2011	California Film Awards	Gold Award	Look	Won	
2011	Best Shorts Competition	Award of Merit	Look	Won	
2009	Accolade Competition	Award of Merit	Look	Won	
