= Veste S.A. Estilo =

Brazilian retail company

Restoque S.A. Comércio e Confecções de Roupas
- Type: Sociedade Anônima
- Traded as: B3: LLIS3
- Industry: Department store
- Founded: 1982
- Headquarters: São Paulo, Brazil
- Key people: Márcio da Rocha Camargo (Chairman); Livingston Martins Bauermeister (CEO)
- Products: Clothing, cosmetics, accessories
- Revenue: ▲US$ 486.6 million (2013)
- Net income: ▲US$ 38.9 million (2013)
- Website: www.restoque.com.br

Restoque is a Brazilian retail company founded in 1982, focused on the sale of clothing, accessories and cosmetics of the highest standard. Restoque operates in Brazil, Italy and Panama and is listed on the B3. It is headquartered in São Paulo and has an office in Blumenau.

The company has 308 stores divided into five brands: Le Lis Blanc Deaux (108 stores), Dudalina (102 stores), Rosa Chá (4 stores), John John (55 stores) and Bo.Bô (43 stores).

In 2022, the company changed its name to Veste. This followed the company's acquisition by Banco Master and Daniel Vorcaro who structured and financed in an operation that would convert the R$1.6 Billion debt into equity. Also, the company board approved the promotion of COO Alexandre Afrange to the position of CEO, replacing Livingston Bauermeister, who had been in charge of the company for seven years.
