= You Only Loved Me Twice =

2008 film by Ryan Pickett

You Only Loved Me Twice is a 2008 American crime drama short film directed by Ryan Pickett. It is streamed by Indieflix.

== Plot ==
You Only Loved Me Twice is a silent film that shows the way deception can be deadly. Wife Amy Miller (Michelle Evans) is preparing a romantic meal for her husband, and the table will be set with flowers and wine. Amy has a perturbed look on her face, which the audience realizes is because she has recently stumbled upon photos of her husband Ray Miller (Matt Bolton) with a young sassy blonde Lisa Hewitt (Jennifer Bonior). When Ray comes home, he brings flowers, that Amy puts in the vase on the table, thinking that Ray wants to apologize for a fight the couple recently had. The couple begins to eat in silence until Ray drops his glass of wine. Amy and Ray clean up the spilled wine, when all of a sudden, Ray sees a gun that is taped under the table. Ray reaches for the gun to prevent Amy from shooting him, but in the tussle, he accidentally shoots Amy. He then waits for his lover Lisa to join him.

== Production ==
You Only Loved Me Twice was written, produced, edited and directed by Ryan Pickett. Justin Eslinger was the cinematographer, while Andrew Stockton was the choreographer.

== Interviews ==
In an interview with the Nashville Business Journal, Patrick said that You Only Loved Me Twice was "a beginning film, but I did decide to go over the top with it".

The Entertainment Corner interviewed Patrick, asking "Your first film You Only Loved Me Twice earned you a top five spot in film entrepreneurship competition The Race to BE hosted by media mogul Russell Simmons. Please share with us what that experience was like and how it has changed your filmmaking career?" Patrick responded, "I appreciated being recognized for my craft and it made me work even harder."

== Reviews ==
Critic Matthew Saliba of Rogue Cinema said, "The visual aesthetic of the film is quite something and very reminiscent of David Lynch's "Lost Highway." The editing and the pacing of the piece is spot-on making the 8 minutes go by quickly. Performances are equally strong with all the right emotions being conveyed, which given the lack of dialogue is no easy task."

Critic Brian Skutle of Sonic Cinema said, "Pickett uses a visual and musical style that brings to mind David Lynch, but while presenting a story that feels more straightforward than anything Lynch has done. It’s riveting stuff, especially when we’re watching the husband and wife do one last tango together."
