= Rock Opera (film) =

- Film poster
- Directed by: Bob Ray
- Written by: Bob Ray
- Produced by: Barna Kantor
- Starring: Jerry Don Clark
- Cinematography: Jackson W. Saunders
- Edited by: Bob Ray
- Music by: Kurtis D. Machler
- Distributed by: Go-Kart Films
- Release dates: March 13, 1999 (Festival); September 3, 1999 (Theater)
- Running time: 87 minutes
- Country: United States
- Language: English

Rock Opera is a 1999 comedy film that follows a fictional Austin, Texas musician's attempt to put together a tour for his struggling and under-appreciated band Pigpoke. The movie debuted at South by Southwest 1999.

== Plot ==
Toe (Jerry Don Clark) wants his rock band Pigpoke to go on tour. He raises funds for the tour by selling marijuana, eventually making leaving town a necessity in order to survive.
