= Bia Doria =

Brazilian artist

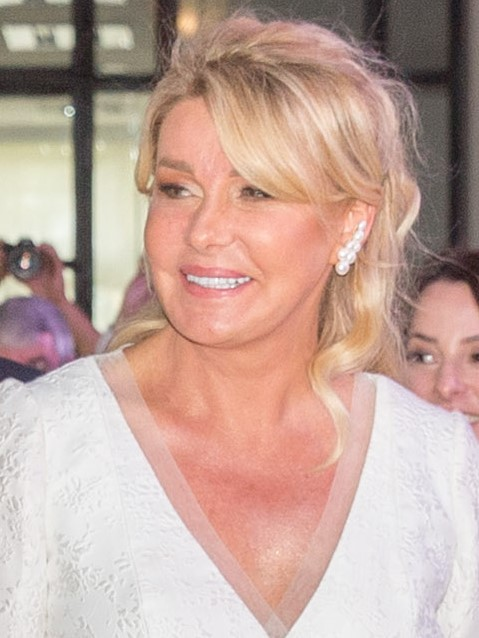

First Lady of São Paulo
- In role 1 January 2019 – 31 March 2022
- Governor: João Doria
- Preceded by: Lúcia França
- Succeeded by: Luciana Garcia

First Lady of São Paulo
- In role 1 January 2017 – 6 April 2018
- Mayor: João Doria
- Preceded by: Ana Estela Haddad
- Succeeded by: Regina Carnovale

Personal details
- Born: Beatriz Maria Bettanin; 8 May 1960 (age 66) Pinhalzinho, Santa Catarina, Brazil
- Spouse: João Doria (m. 1987)
- Profession: Plastic artist
- Website: www.biadoria.com.br

Beatriz Maria Bettanin Doria, better known as Bia Doria (born 8 May 1961), is a Brazilian plastic artist, and former First Lady of São Paulo (state), being married to former Governor João Doria.

== Interview to Folha de S.Paulo ==
In October 2016, soon after her husband had won the 2016 São Paulo mayoral election, Bia Doria gave an interview to Folha de S.Paulo newspaper where she stated not knowing famous places in São Paulo center region (mostly visited by poorer people) and that the Avanhandava Street (known for its fine dining restaurants) was the only place safe enough for one to walk on "as in New York". About the rampant social inequality of the city, she said something should be done to diminish the gap between the rich and the poor because "it's not good to have an employee with nutritional problems". She also mentioned she would never ride on São Paulo's bikeways due to safety issues. Besides the elitist tone of her declarations, she said she felt comfortable near poor people, and compared herself to Eva Perón. The interview was held inside her Porsche Cayenne.

The interview had wide negative repercussion for her and her husband's image. Bia's personal website was hacked the on same day the interview was published. After the episode, Bia Doria avoided giving further interviews.

Honorary titles
Preceded by Ana Estela Haddad	First Lady of São Paulo; 2017–2018	Vacant Title next held by Regina Carnovale
Preceded by Lúcia França	First Lady of São Paulo; 2019–2022	Succeeded by Luciana Garcia
