= Estilo Hip Hop =

2009 film directed by Loira Limbal, Vee Bravo

- Directed by: Loira Limbal; Vee Bravo
- Distributed by: IndiePix Films
- Release date: 2009
- Running time: 57 minutes
- Countries: United States; Cuba; Brazil; Chile
- Languages: English; Portuguese

Estilo Hip Hop is a 2009 documentary film directed by Loira Limbal and Vee Bravo and distributed by IndiePix Films. It chronicles the lives of three rappers/political activists - Eli Efi of Brazil, Guerrillero Okulto of Chile and Magia of Cuba - and how they attempt to use their music to reach out to the youth of their respective countries. Estilo Hip Hop is currently being aired as part of the PBS series Global Voices, and has had live screenings in select theaters in California and New York. The documentary will be released on DVD on June 22, 2010, and is currently available on both Amazon and iTunes.

== Reception ==
Reception to Estilo Hip-Hop has been generally positive. XXL Magazine described the film as "an antidote to the get-rich-quick schemes favored by many in modern hip-hop." PopMatters awarded the documentary a 7/10 score and called it "sharp (and) engaging."
