= So Bright Is the View =

- Directed by: Joël Florescu, Michaël Florescu
- Written by: Joël Florescu, Michaël Florescu
- Produced by: Ronella Sezonov
- Starring: Bianca Valea, Ovidu Niculescu
- Cinematography: Ronella Sezonov
- Edited by: Alice Gheorghiu
- Distributed by: IndiePix Films (US)
- Release date: 24 June 2014
- Running time: 102 minutes
- Country: Romania
- Language: Romanian

So Bright Is the View (Romanian: Atât de strălucitoare e vederea) is a 2014 Romanian film written and directed by twin brothers Joël and Michaël Florescu. It premiered as part of the Official Selection of the 36th Moscow International Film Festival.

== Plot ==
Present day Bucharest. Estera is pursuing a job opportunity in Atlanta. She puts her hope in a "friend-interview" with Mike, a Romanian-American entrepreneur who reveals himself to be a domineering wreck with issues of his own.

== Cast ==
- Bianca Valea as Estera
- Ovidiu Niculescu as Mike
- Robi Urs as Vlad
- Valentina Popa as Raluca
- Dana Apostol as Rivka
- Cristina Olteanu as Oana
- Dana Cucos as Luminita

== Filmmakers ==
Joel Florescu and Michael Florescu, the writers and directors, are twin brothers of Franco-Romanian origin who began their cinematographic projects in Bucharest as part of the Romanian Independent Film Collective.

== Reception ==
David Walsh has dubbed So Bright Is the View "a serious film" and noted the film's "sociological significance", indicating the emergence of a new generation of filmmakers in Romania that critically addresses contemporary socioeconomic realities. Walsh praised the Florescu brothers' "obvious talent" and "ability to present the drama of everyday life", while critiquing the film's aesthetic "formalism".

== Distribution ==
The film was acquired for distribution in North America by IndiePix Films.
