= Theresa Meeker =

Theresa Pickett
- Born: Theresa Meeker
- Education: Flagler College BA; Vanderbilt University M.Ed
- Occupations: Writer, communications professional, on-camera presenter
- Years active: 2007–present

Theresa Pickett is an American writer, communications professional, and on-camera presenter. Her work focuses on travel, tourism, and lifestyle topics, with writing published in outlets including Business Insider, Hotels Above Par, and HuffPost. She has also appeared on regional television news programs in the Mid-Atlantic discussing tourism and lifestyle topics. In 2026, she received the Howard County Arts Council's Individual Artist Merit & Creativity Grant in Literary Arts.

== Early life and education ==
Pickett grew up in Nashville, Tennessee. She attended Flagler College and Vanderbilt University and also studied at the Lorenzo de’ Medici Institute in Florence, Italy.

== Writing and communications ==
Pickett is a writer and marketing communications professional whose work spans travel, culture, and lifestyle topics. She has contributed writing to publications including Business Insider, Hotels Above Par, HuffPost, Her View From Home, and other regional and national outlets.

In addition to editorial writing, she has worked in marketing communications and digital media strategy for organizations in the tourism, hospitality, government, utilities, and nonprofit sectors, including Visit Howard County and Visit Culpeper.

== Broadcast and media ==
Pickett has appeared as a presenter on lifestyle, travel, and tourism topics for Baltimore-area television news programs, including WJLA ABC 7 News and FOX 45 Morning News.

She is the creator, host, and producer of the web series Theresa’s Reviews (2016–2023), where she served as writer, director, editor, and on-camera host. The series features interviews and lifestyle content and has included appearances by public figures such as Idina Menzel and Jerry O’Connell.

== Early career ==
Earlier in her career, Pickett appeared in independent short films and music videos, and held production and publicity roles on independent film projects between 2007 and 2009.

== Awards and recognition ==
Pickett received an Individual Artist Merit & Creativity Grant in Literary Arts from the Howard County Arts Council in 2026.
