= Darklight Film Festival =

The Darklight Film Festival is an event that occurs annually in Dublin and Belfast. The festival takes place over a weekend and screens independent and artist film as well as different forms of technology that can further expand this industry. Art exhibitions, seminars and workshops also take place over the weekend. The festival's website describes it as "Ireland's premier festival celebrating independent, DIY and artist films." The festival was first held in 1999.

The festival is sponsored primarily by the Arts Council, Dublin City Council, the Irish Film Board, FÁS, Culture Ireland and Waterways Ireland.

In 2009, an anthology mystery-horror film titled Hotel Darklight was produced by and for the festival. The film features ten short segments, all set in the eponymous sinister hotel and sharing a "Twilight Zone-esque atmosphere".
