= Banco Master scandal =

2025–26 fraud scandal in Brazil

- The liquidations of companies and groups belonging to Banco Master were the most damaging and central themes of the scandal.
- Operation codename: Operation Compliance Zero
- Type: Anti-corruption

Participants
- Initiated by: Federal Police of Brazil
- Executed by: Lead prosecutor (PGR): Paulo Gonet; (Nov 2025 – present); Primary judge (STF): Dias Toffoli; (Nov 2025 – Feb 2026); André Mendonça; (Feb 2026 – present)

Mission
- Target: Daniel Vorcaro and Banco Master executives; Banco de Brasília (BRB) officials; Central Bank staff; members of the Brazilian Congress and other public officials allegedly linked to the scheme
- Objective: Investigate fraud against the National Financial System involving Banco Master, money laundering, and corruption of public officials

Timeline
- Date begin: 18 November 2025 (ongoing)

Results
- Suspects: Classified
- Arrests: 13

The Banco Master scandal is an ongoing political scandal in Brazil, involving investigations into alleged financial fraud in private bank Banco Master and the political dealings of its major shareholder, businessman Daniel Vorcaro. The scandal emerged in late 2025 with the launch of Operation Compliance Zero by the Federal Police and the liquidation of the financial institution by the Central Bank, as well as Vorcaro's arrest in November. It has been described as the country's biggest ever banking fraud scandal, with evidence of involvement of political authorities, Central Bank employees and members of the judiciary.

The scandal involves the offering of investment securities with promises of large returns, even though the bank did not have the assets and financial resources it required to maintain as collateral. The operation functioned, in practice, as a kind of pyramid scheme, in which applications from new customers covered the deficit of previous customers. The bank also overvalued the property and assets it offered as collateral.

The Central Bank of Brazil, responsible for the oversight of financial institutions, had failed in preventing fraud. Financial institutions linked to state governments – such as the Banco de Brasília (BRB) – invested large sums in Banco Master in transactions deemed suspicious. Brazilian press also revealed that Vorcaro and Banco Master sought to cultivate relationships with officials at multiple levels of government – federal, state, and municipal, as well as within the judiciary – to offer them bargains, such as trips in private jets, parties, financial support in electoral campaigns, and service contracts, along others.

The Federal Police's investigations point to a criminal organization with four main cores of operation: a financial core, which was responsible for structuring frauds against the financial system; an institutional corruption core, aimed at co-opting Central Bank employees; a core for asset concealment and money laundering, using shell companies; and a core for intimidation and obstruction of justice, responsible for the illegal surveillance of opponents, journalists and officials.

News pieces since the end of 2025 indicate that multiple public figures had, supposedly, direct access and financial relations with Daniel Vorcaro through the broadly inclusive ramifications of the scandal between politicians, members of the Supreme Federal Court (STF) and state governments. The press indicates that those who had received money from Banco Master, amongst others, Guido Mantega (a million reais per month), Ricardo Lewandowski (6 million reais to his family's office) and Viviane Barci de Moraes, wife of minister Alexandre de Moraes (a 129 million reais contract paid in portions of 3,6 million per month – interrupted with the bank's liquidation). Later, in April 2026, it was disclosed more politicians which received money from Banco Master, including the ex-president of the Republic Michel Temer, ex-mayor of Salvador ACM Neto, and the then president of the União Brasil party Antônio de Rueda. The investigations have also implicated senators Ciro Nogueira (former Chief of Staff under Jair Bolsonaro), Flávio Bolsonaro (son of former president Jair Bolsonaro and presidential candidate), and Jaques Wagner (Lula government's leader in the Federal Senate).

The scandal implicates Vorcaro, who was a major shareholder in Banco Master, which operated in Faria Lima, São Paulo. Vorcaro was arrested in November 2025 as he attempted to flee Brazil. Investigators uncovered ties between Vorcaro and members of the Supreme Federal Court.

Brazilian state-run bank Banco de Brasília is expected to set aside over 5 billion reais ($970 million) to cover transactions with the failed lender. According to estimates by Brazil's Federal Police, the bank's missing funds may reach 12 billion reais ($2.2 billion), and a minimum of 1.6 million people may have been affected. Finance Minister Fernando Haddad stated this could be “the biggest bank fraud” in Brazilian history.

== See also ==
- List of scandals in Brazil
