= Hell on Wheels (2007 film) =

- Directed by: Bob Ray
- Produced by: Werner Campbell; Jerelyn Orlandi
- Cinematography: Bob Ray; Werner Campbell
- Edited by: Conor O'Neill; Cory Ryan
- Music by: ...And You Will Know Us By the Trail of the Dead
- Distributed by: Indiepix Films
- Release date: 2007
- Running time: 90 minutes
- Country: United States
- Language: English

Hell on Wheels is a 2007 documentary film telling the story of a group of Texas women who band together to resurrect roller derby for the 21st century. Emerging from the Austin music and arts scene, these women create a rock-and-roll fueled version of all-girl roller derby that has spawned the derby craze that's sweeping the nation.

== Soundtrack ==
The film features original music by ...And You Will Know Us by the Trail of Dead.

== Crew ==
- Director: Bob Ray
- Producer: Werner Campbell & Bob Ray
- Editor: Conor O’Neill, Cory Ryan
- Music: ...And You Will Know Us by the Trail of Dead

== Cast ==
- TXRD Lonestar Rollergirls (BGGW)
- Nancy Haggerty
- Anya Jack
- Heather Burdick
- April Herman
- Sara Luna
- Amanda Fields
- Texas Rollergirls
- Lane Greer
- Laurie Rourke
- Theresa Papas
- Amy Sherman
- Rachelle Moore
