= Daniel Vorcaro =

Brazilian businessman and investment banker (born 1983)

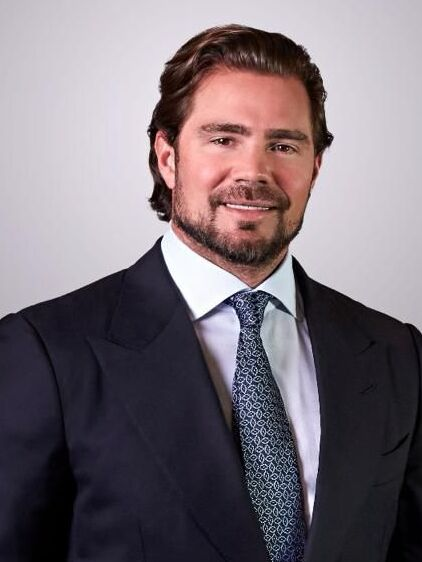
- Vorcaro in 2024
- Born: Daniel Bueno Vorcaro; 6 October 1983 (age 43); Belo Horizonte, Minas Gerais, Brazil
- Education: Brazilian Institute of Capital Markets (IBMEC)
- Occupation: Businessman
- Known for: Former owner of Banco Master; Banco Master scandal
- Notable work: Gravity
- Partner: Maryia Lubimova (2023)
- Children: Stella Vorcaro

Details
- Date apprehended: 4 March 2026
- Imprisoned at: Penitentiary Complex; Brasília, Federal District

Daniel Bueno Vorcaro (born 6 October 1983) is a Brazilian former banker and businessman. He is involved in numerous frauds in the financial, real estate, healthcare, and retail sectors. He gained prominence as the majority shareholder and president of Banco Master (formerly Banco Máxima), guiding the institution through phases of expansion and investment diversification. Vorcaro's career encompassed investments in companies such as Biomm and Veste S.A. Estilo, participation in the investor group of Clube Atlético Mineiro's Sociedade Anônima do Futebol, and a notable presence in real estate and large-scale ventures operated via Viking Participações.

Vorcaro gained public attention due to his involvement in Federal Police of Brazil investigations into a multi-billion–dollar financial scheme, which led to the extrajudicial liquidation of Banco Master in November 2025, and an estimated R$41 billion loss to the Credit Guarantee Fund (FGC), an amount reported by the fund and the trade press as the highest ever in its history.

== Life and career ==
=== Early life and career beginnings ===
Daniel Vorcaro was born in Belo Horizonte, Minas Gerais, the son of Henrique Vorcaro, a real estate broker, and grandson of Serafim Vorcaro, an Italian immigrant and Protestant pastor. He holds a degree in Administration and an MBA from the Brazilian Institute of Capital Markets, completed in 2007. The family is associated with the Lagoinha Baptist Church. Between 2008 and 2009, he hosted a gospel music program called Supersônica on Rede Super, a television station acquired by his father and linked to the church. His sister, Natalia Vorcaro Zettel, is a pastor at one of the church's branches in the state capital.

Vorcaro's first business venture occurred at age 19, when he began managing PQS Empreendimentos Educacionais, an educational course in Nova Lima, and a textbook publisher, both acquired by his father. The business was subsequently sold following reports of management conflicts. Starting in 2004, he entered the real estate sector through family companies such as Multipar and Mercatto.

=== Involvement in the financial and investment industry ===
In 2018, Vorcaro entered an agreement to acquire Banco Máxima from Saul Sabbá, who had been restricted from banking operations by the Central Bank of Brazil. In partnership with the Conte brothers, he obtained regulatory approval for the transfer of control in 2019, and in 2021, the institution was rebranded as Banco Master. Beyond the financial sector, Vorcaro expanded his investments with stakes in the Minas Gerais-based pharmaceutical company Biomm and the São Paulo-based retail group Veste S.A. Estilo (formerly Restoque). In 2023, he invested in the Football Corporation (SAF) of Clube Atlético Mineiro.

=== Operational strategy and Banco Master expansion ===
During Vorcaro's management, Banco Master saw significant growth: between 2019 and 2024, its net worth increased from R$200 million to R$4.7 billion, and its credit portfolio grew from R$1.4 billion to R$40 billion. This growth was supported by the extensive issuance of Bank Deposit Certificates (CDBs) offering returns above the market average, reaching up to 130% of the CDI. The capital raised was often allocated to funds managed by the bank, which included assets from companies undergoing financial restructuring, such as Oi, Gafisa, Light S.A., CVC Brasil, and Ambipar.

=== Allegations of misconduct ===
To address liquidity requirements, investigations by the Public Prosecutor's Office (MPF) allege that the bank used a company called 'Tirreno'–allegedly established as a front–to create fictitious credits. Vorcaro initially stated that these credits came from civil servant associations in Bahia. The assets, which lacked independent backing, were subsequently sold to Banco de Brasília (BRB). Investigations by the MPF indicate that BRB injected around R$16.7 billion into Banco Master between 2024 and 2025, of which at least R$12.2 billion involved these particular unsecured transactions, described as a way to support the bank's financial position.

In December 2024, the then-President of the Central Bank of Brazil, Roberto Campos Neto, called Vorcaro to an emergency meeting, requesting a capital injection to address liquidity concerns. Under pressure from the Central Bank, Vorcaro explored the possibility of selling Banco Master to BRB and engaged prominent legal and political figures, including former President Michel Temer and former Supreme Court Justice Ricardo Lewandowski (as a consultant), to advise and represent his interests. The proposed transaction, which had local political backing, was blocked by the Central Bank in September 2025 due to concerns over financial viability. Following this decision, BRB President Paulo Henrique Costa was removed from his position.

=== Investigations and judicial developments ===
On 17 November 2025, Vorcaro was taken into custody by the Federal Police of Brazil at São Paulo/Guarulhos International Airport while preparing to board his private Falcon 7X jet to Malta. Hours earlier, the Central Bank of Brazil had ordered the extrajudicial liquidation of Banco Master, overturning the announcement made the previous day about its sale to a consortium led by Fictor Holding Financeira. Vorcaro's defense stated that his intended destination was Dubai for a meeting with investors and that the travel had been communicated to the Central Bank; however, Brazilian judicial authorities interpreted the trip as an attempt to flee. On 28 November 2025, the Regional Federal Court ordered Vorcaro's release subject to precautionary measures. On 2 December 2025, Supreme Federal Court Minister Dias Toffoli imposed maximum secrecy on Vorcaro's defense request. On 4 March 2026, the Supreme Federal Court ordered Vorcaro's arrest.

== Personal life and wealth ==
Vorcaro accumulated considerable wealth. His holdings included private jets through Viking Participações and a property in Trancoso, Bahia, valued at R$280 million. In 2023, he organized a 15th birthday celebration for his daughter in Nova Lima, which included international performers and accommodations for nearby residents in hotels to minimize disturbances. In March 2025, he acquired a property in Trancoso, Bahia, and participated in financing the Café de La Musique Alma Rio VIP box during the Rio Carnival. From September 2025, Vorcaro faced significant legal and commercial problems.

In March 2026, materials seized from Vorcaro's phone by the Federal Police of Brazil during an investigation revealed a prior personal relationship with Russian model and influencer Maryia Lubimova, who was saved in his contacts list under the name "My Future Wife". Lubimova publicly acknowledged the past personal relationship while stating that she had no involvement in Vorcaro's financial or business activities.
