= Banco de Brasília =

State owned bank from Brasília

BRB Banco de Brasília S.A.

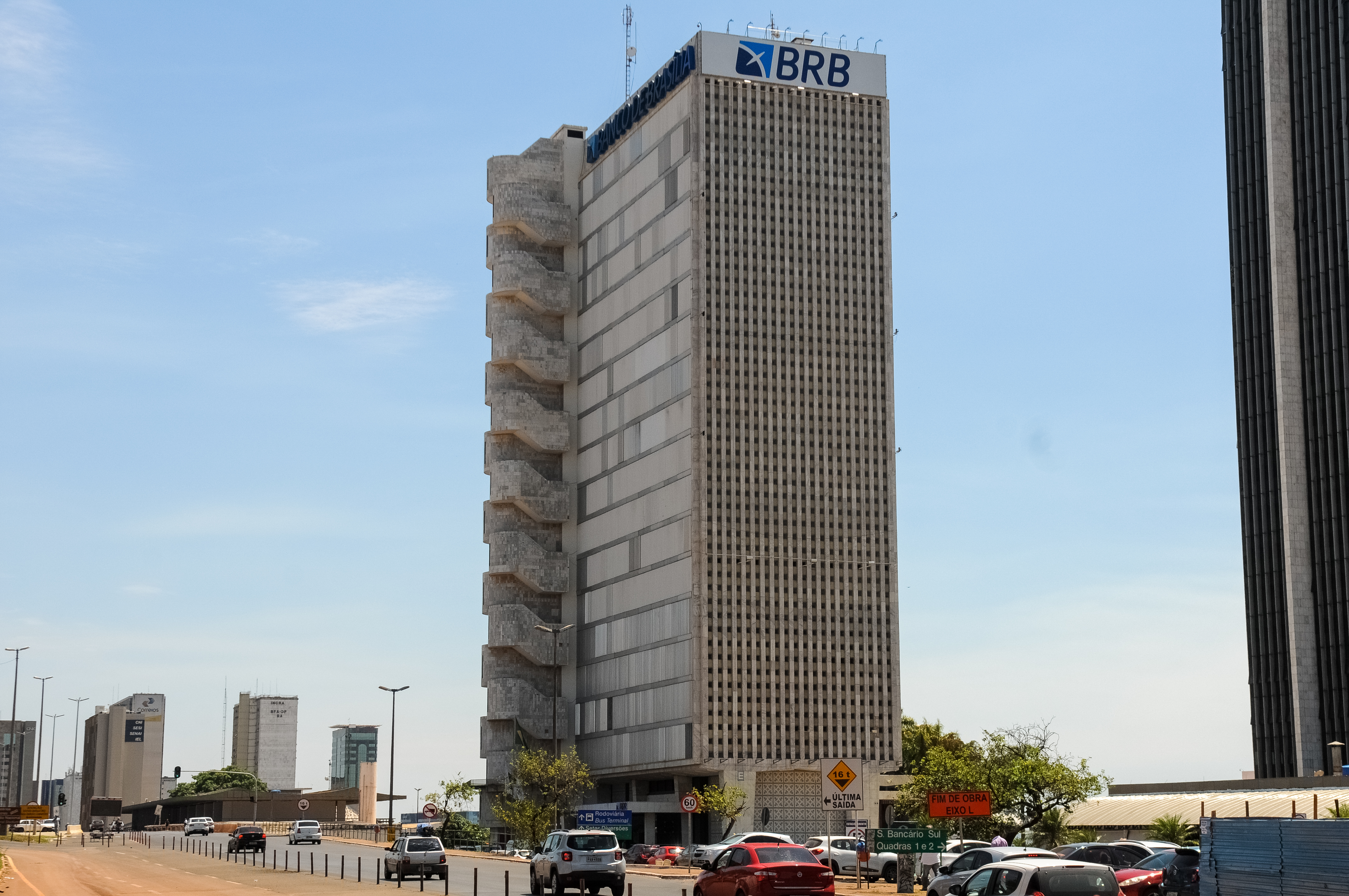
- Original headquarters in Brasília, DF.
- Type: Sociedade Anônima
- Traded as: B3: BSLI3
- Industry: Financial services
- Founded: 1983
- Headquarters: Brasília, DF, Brazil
- Key people: Paulo Henrique Bezerra R. Costa, (Chair and CEO)
- Products: Banking
- Revenue: ▲US$832.8 million (2017)
- Net income: ▲US$78.4 million (2017)
- Total assets: ▲US$4.2 billion (2017)
- Number of employees: 3,280
- Website: www.brb.com.br

BRB Banco de Brasília S.A, more commonly referred to as BRB or Banco de Brasília, (Note: English: Bank of Brasília) is a state owned Brazilian bank that is controlled by the government of the Federal District. The Bank offers a range of financial products and services, including saving accounts, credit cards, investment services, insurance and loans, among others. The Bank has both individual and corporate customers. The company is part of the BRB group, comprising Cartão BRB, Seguros BRB, Financeira Brasília, BRB DTVM, BRB Saude, Regius and BRB Mobilidade. BRB was founded in 1983 and is headquartered in Brasília, DF. BRB is listed in the B3 stock exchange in São Paulo.

The bank operates through 116 bank branches and 797 ATMs in the Federal District, and in states of São Paulo, Rio de Janeiro, Minas Gerais, Goiás, Mato Grosso and Mato Grosso do Sul. In 2020, the bank established an innovative partnership with Flamengo, the biggest football team in Brazil, to co-create a digital bank to serve Flamengo's 42 million fans.

BRB has a total of 3,280 employees, in addition to 450 interns, 120 apprentices and 705 outsourced workers, thus generating more than 4,500 jobs. The bank has 138 service points, of which: 123 branches (107 in the Federal District and 16 in other states, five located in the capital cities: Campo Grande, Cuiabá, Goiânia, Rio de Janeiro, São Paulo; one in Unaí and ten in the countryside of the State of Goiás), besides twelve PAs in the Federal District and three in other states.

== History ==
BRB, a mixed-capital company, whose majority shareholder is the Government of the Federal District, was created on 10 December 1964 (Federal Law 4545) obtaining, from the Central Bank of Brazil, authorization to operate on 12 July 1966. its creation was intended to provide the Federal District with a financial agent that would make it possible to raise funds necessary for the development of the region.

In 1986, its name was changed from Banco Regional de Brasília S.A. to Banco de Brasília S.A., the acronym BRB remaining.

In 1991, it became a multiple-service bank with the following portfolios: Commercial, Foreign Exchange, Development and Real Estate. As affiliated companies, BRB – Distribuidora de Títulos e Valores Mobiliários, BRB – Crédito, Financiamento e Investimento and Corretora Seguros BRB are part of the financial conglomerate. There is a 45% shareholding in the card company – Cartão BRB S.A. and 3.5% as founding partner of Companhia Brasileira de Securitização – CIBRASEC.

In September 2019, an agreement between Banco de Brasília and Cielo in the area of acquiring cards, guaranteed an initiative that complements the portfolio of products offered by the institution to entrepreneurs in the Federal District and region.

In January 2020, Banco de Brasília (BRB) was the bank that granted the most mortgage loans in the Federal District, according to a ranking published by the Brazilian Association of Real Estate Credit and Savings Entities (ABECIP).

In July 2020, Banco de Brasília (BRB) became Flamengo's master sponsor for a period of three years, after BS2 terminated the contract with the club from Rio de Janeiro, with a minimum value of BRL 32 million per year, but with the possibility of have increased revenue through the exploration of businesses provided for in the agreement involving fans, image and corporate business with the club.

In December 2021, BRB acquired the naming rights to the Estádio Mané Garrincha, renaming it to Arena BRB until 2024.

On 13 May 2022, BRB signed an agreement with construction firm Terracap to transfer ownership of the Autódromo Internacional Nelson Piquet. The deal also meant that BRB was now responsible for the refurbishing and restructuring of the circuit.

In April 2025, BRB controlled by Brazil's Federal District, has agreed to acquire only the most strategic and financially sound assets from Banco Master after months of negotiation, according to BRB CEO Paulo Henrique Costa. The 2 billion reais ($350 million) deal, is to be paid over six years, still under due diligence and could see a price adjustment in the future. The acquisition excludes riskier assets such as those linked to court-ordered payments and certain investment funds. About 23 billion reais worth of Master’s assets remain outside the deal. While the central bank has up to 360 days to approve the transaction, BRB expects a faster decision. Meanwhile, BTG Pactual is reportedly interested in acquiring some of the assets BRB declined.

== Services ==
BRB offers a variety of services to the consumer, including ATMs, health insurance, loans, and investment services. BRB also offers a wide variety of debit and credit cards in partnership with Visa and Mastercard, which depend on the consumer's income.

== Sponsorship ==
=== Motorsport ===
Banco de Brasília sponsors several events, including the Stock Car Brasil Super Final BRB. BRB sponsors Stock Car Brasil drivers Lucas Foresti and Enzo Elias. It also sponsors the Brazilian Automobile Confederation. BRB sponsored the Alpine F1 Team during the 2023 São Paulo Grand Prix weekend.

Since 2023, the bank has been the title sponsor of the TCR South America touring car championship.

=== Other sports ===
BRB owns the naming rights to the Autódromo de Brasília, Arena BRB Mané Garrincha, and the Nilson Nelson Gymnasium. The bank is also the title sponsor of Flamengo, as well as the Brasília Basquete basketball team.

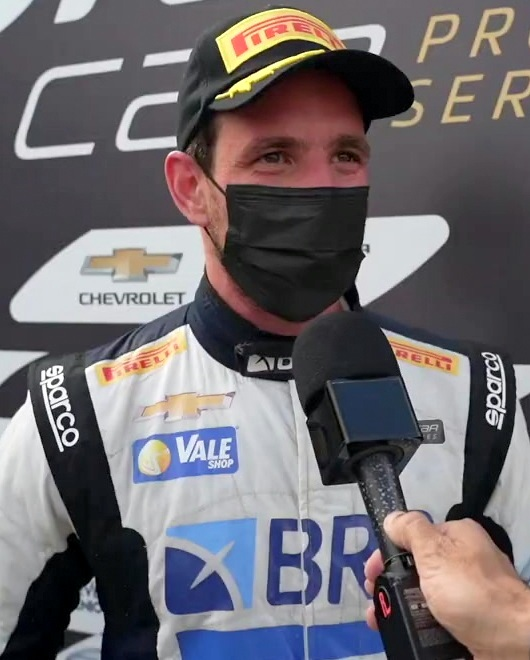
Lucas Foresti

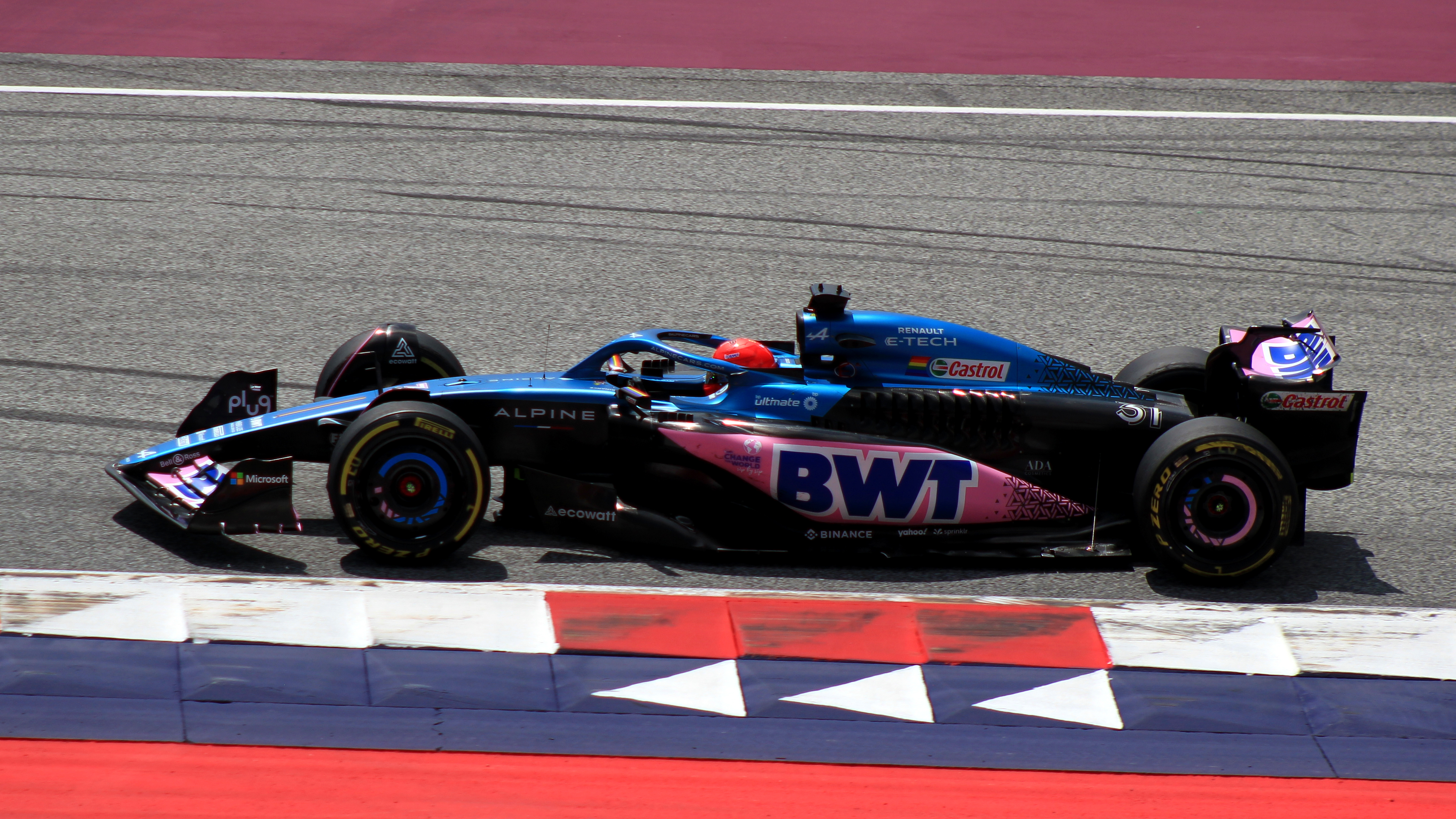
Alpine F1

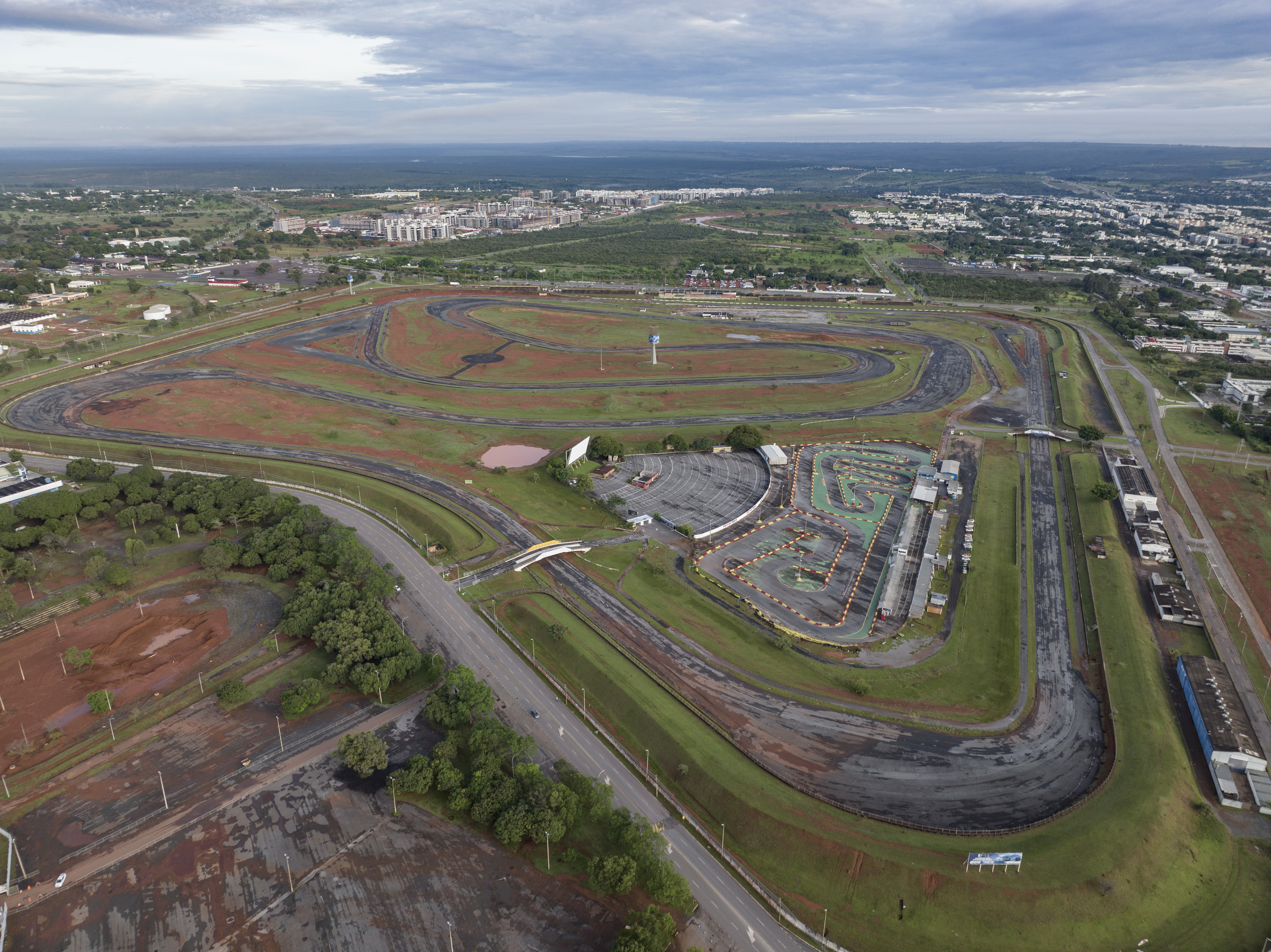
Autódromo Internacional Nelson Piquet (Brasília)

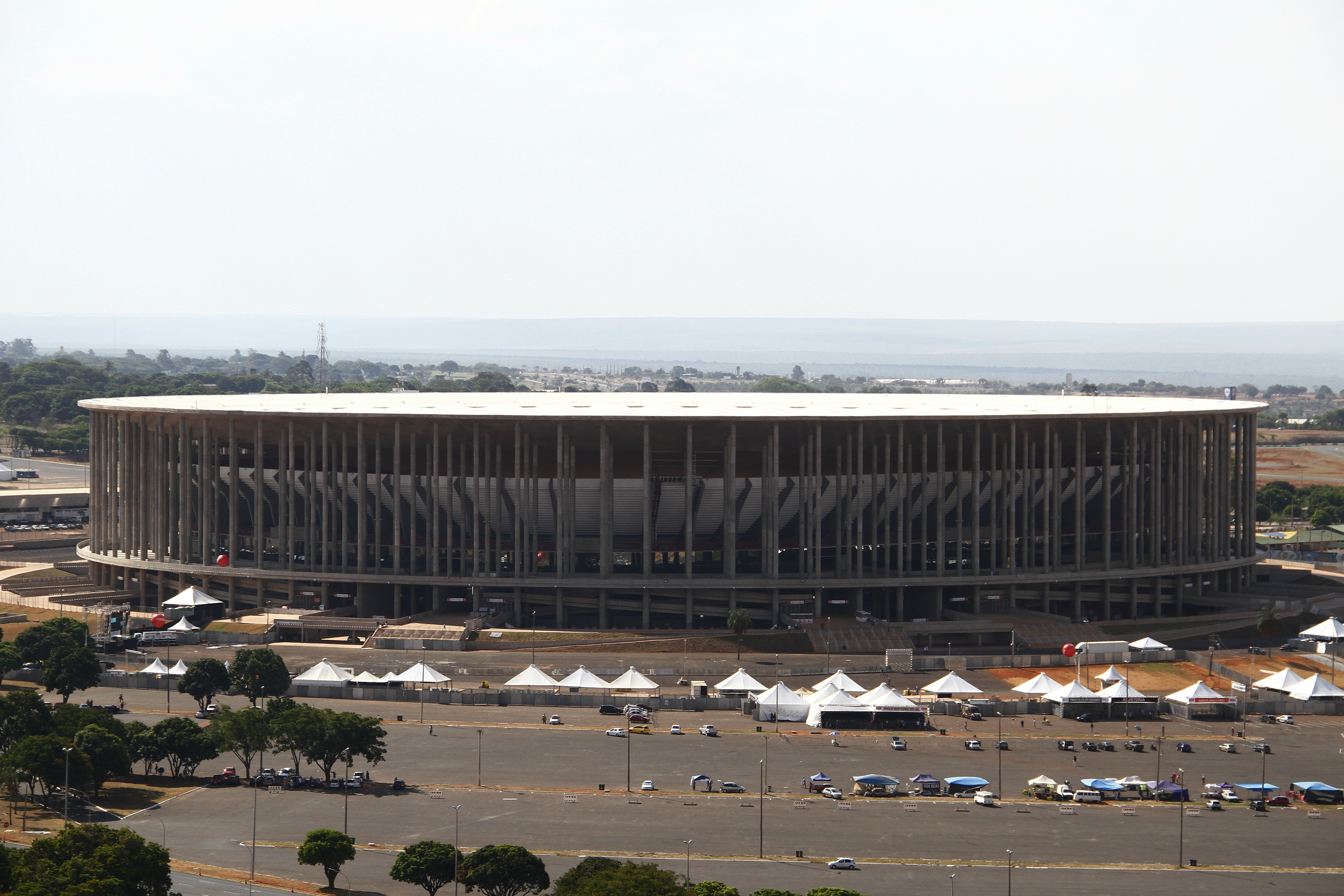
Estádio Nacional Mané Garrincha

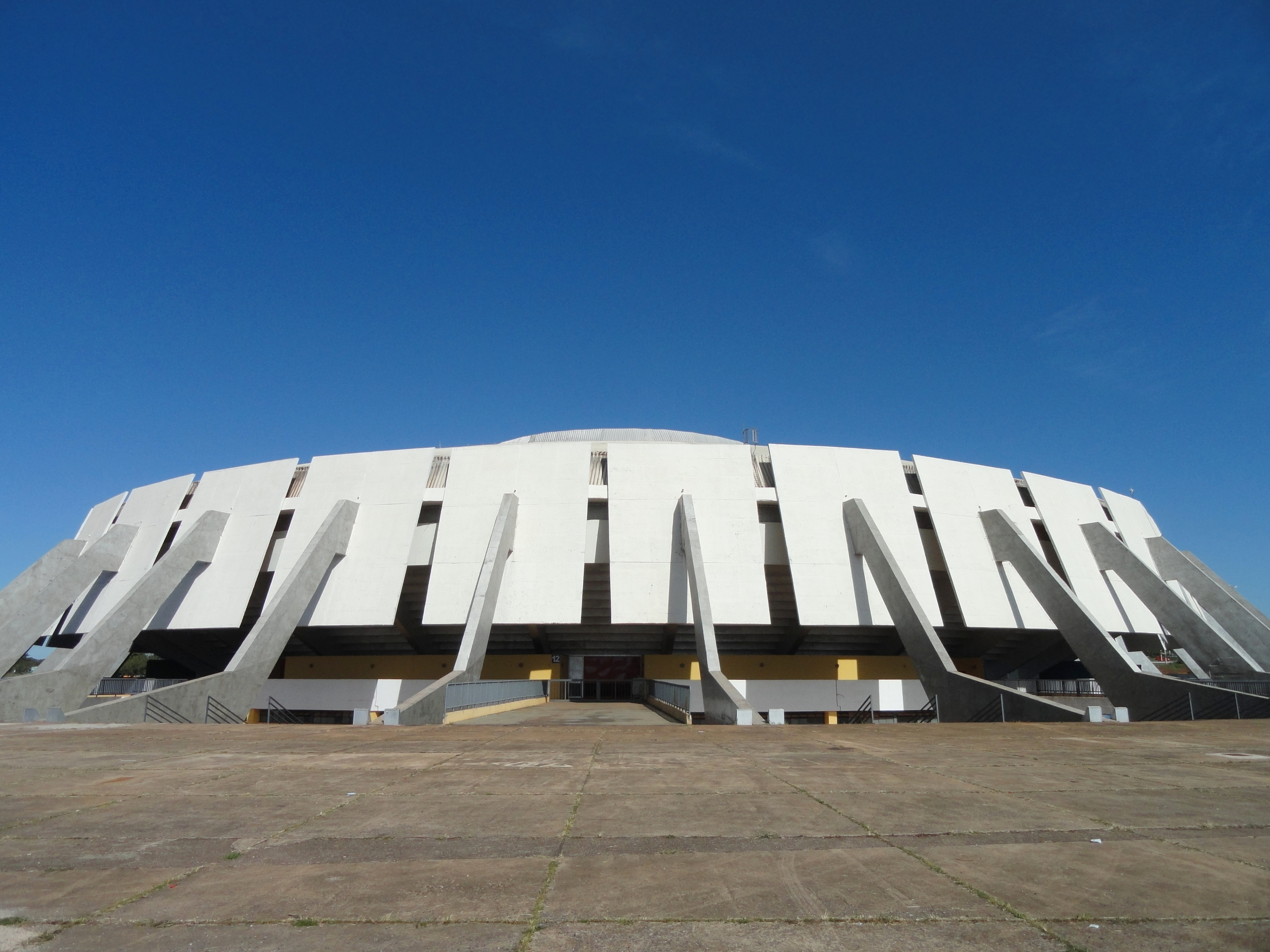
Nilson Nelson Gymnasium

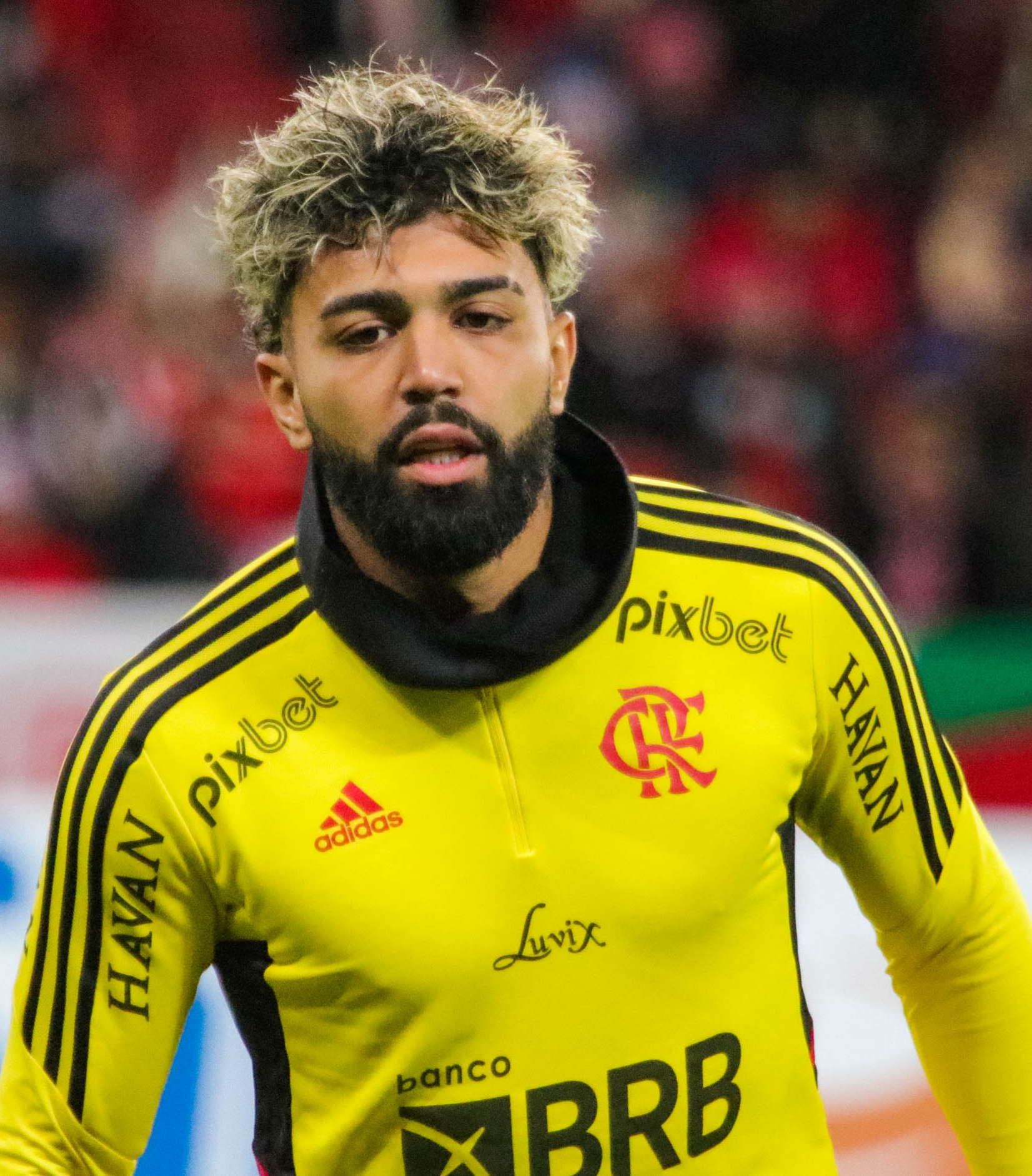
CR Flamengo
