= Banco Master =

Defunct Brazilian financial institution

- Type: Unlisted public company
- Industry: Financial services
- Founded: 1970; 56 years ago São Paulo, Brazil
- Defunct: 18 November 2025
- Fate: Liquidated
- Headquarters: São Paulo, Brazil
- Key people: Daniel Vorcaro
- Number of employees: 515 (2025)
- Website: www.bancomaster.com.br

Banco Master was a Brazilian financial institution based in São Paulo which also served as an investment brokerage firm. It is in the process of being liquidated as ordered by the Central Bank of Brazil. The bank was founded in 1970 as Banco Máxima, but the name and direction of the company were changed in 2018 in the midst of reforms.

On 18 November 2025, the bank was ordered by federal authorities to be extrajudicially liquidated, with the owner, Daniel Vorcaro, being arrested for money laundering as a result of the Banco Master scandal.

== Financial Ratings ==
In October 2022, Banco Master received a Long Term Issuer Default Rating in Foreign Currency, a Local ‘B’, and a “B” Viability Rating from Fitch Ratings.

In October 2024, after publishing its earnings for the first semester of the year, Fitch Ratings raised its national rating for the bank from BBB to A− and maintained its B+ rating on the global ranking, with the company describing the bank as “stable”. At the end of the first semester of 2025, Banco Master had liquid assets of 4.2 billion Brazilian real after reaching 500 million in gross profits in the first 6 months of that year.

== History ==
=== Banco Máxima ===
In 1974, the company was founded as Máxima Corretora de Títulos e Valores Mobiliários. The bank obtained permission from the Central Bank of Brazil to operate as a financial institution in 1990, which gave rise to Banco Máxima. Around ten years after, the bank began credit operations, expanding its portfolio to primarily include mortgage loans. Later on in 2016, however, Banco Máxima was close to insolvency after defaulting on their inventory of mortgage loans.

=== Banco Master ===
From 2018 to 2021, the bank went through wholesale reforms in its layout and operational structure, with a capitalization of 400 million Brazilian real. The bank went on to be called Banco Master. Vorcaro, the president of the bank at the time, and the other new associates implemented a series of reforms to get Banco Master out of its delicate financial situation that they found the bank in. As they assumed control of the bank, they established a new strategy for the business; The steps for the new strategy included a diversification of their portfolio, with less real estate financing contracts and the addition of other sources of income such as payday loans, personal credit, finance services, insurance, and investment banks.

==== Will Bank ====
On 22 February 2024, Banco Master announced that they would be buying a majority stake of Will Bank, a digital bank with more than 6 million customers, mainly in the Northeast region of Brazil. The agreement, the value of which has not been revealed, enabled Banco Master to expand its customer base to 10.5 million people throughout the country.

Will Bank had 756 employees as of 2024, and had as its target audience working class consumers without a bank account in other institutions. The institution had profits of 2.8 billion real in 2023. In 2021, it received a cash infusion of 250 million real from private equity firms XP and Atmos. With the transaction, Atmos and its founders left the business. Chu Kong, one of the people who initially created the idea of Will Bank and who was an associate of XP, continued to be an advisor for the bank.

In October 2024, Will Bank announced their partnership with football player Vinicius Júnior, who plays for both the Brazilian national team and Real Madrid, as their new ambassador.

==== Oncoclínicas ====
On 22 May 2024, Banco Master built a financial operation with funds from investment firms Quíron and Tessália to undersign a billion reais for the new initiatives of Oncoclínicas, a health network specializing in cancer treatments. With this, the funds anchored by Banco Master went on to hold 12% of Oncoclínicas, for which the increase in capital was complimented by another 500 million real by CEO and founder Bruno Lemos Ferrari. This elevated the total capital of the company to 1.5 billion real.

Ferrari's contribution to Oncoclínicas was also structured by Banco Master. With the operation, its equity stake rose from 5% to 11%. Goldman Sachs also held 36% of the company. The rest of the actions were flattened by the market. Oncoclínicas informed that the new resources would help them to reinforce its capital structure and for it to maintain its growth strategy in Brazil.

== Liquidation of Banco Master and Will Bank ==
On 18 November 2025, the Central Bank of Brazil ordered the liquidation of Banco Master. This is often ordered by the Central Bank due to the financial situation of an institution being unrecoverable.

On 21 January 2026, the Central Bank also ordered Will Bank's liquidation.

== See also ==
- Banco Master scandal
- XP Investimentos
- Banco BMG
