= Attempted assassination of Jair Bolsonaro =

2018 stabbing attack on Brazilian politician

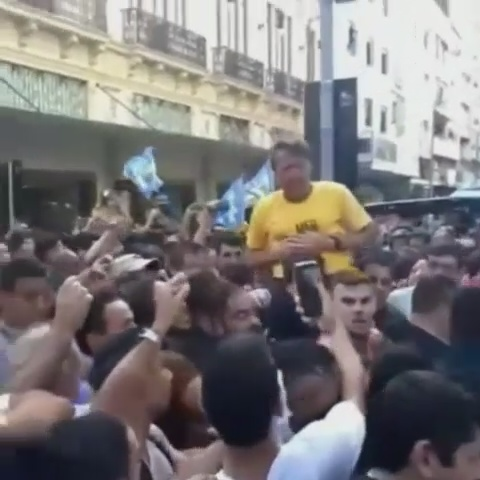
- Jair Bolsonaro at the moment he is stabbed.
- Location: 21°45′38.6″S 43°20′49″W; Juiz de Fora, Minas Gerais, Brazil
- Date: 6 September 2018; 8 years ago c. 15:40 BRT (UTC-03:00)
- Target: Jair Bolsonaro
- Attack type: Attempted murder, stabbing
- Weapon: Knife
- Deaths: 0
- Injuries: 1
- Victim: Jair Bolsonaro
- Perpetrator: Adélio Bispo de Oliveira
- No. of participants: 1
- Motive: The perpetrator cited political conspiracy theories and said he acted by "Order of God".

On 6 September 2018, then federal deputy Jair Bolsonaro suffered an attack during a rally promoting his election campaign for the presidency of Brazil. While being carried through a crowd of supporters, Bolsonaro suffered a knife wound to the abdomen from Adélio Bispo de Oliveira.

Immediately after the attack, Bolsonaro was taken to the Santa Casa de Misericórdia in Juiz de Fora, where it was found that the stabbing had caused three injuries to his small intestine and an injury to a vein in the abdomen that caused heavy bleeding. Despite the seriousness of the injuries and the heavy loss of blood, the presidential candidate survived. In all, Bolsonaro underwent four surgeries related to the damage caused by the attack.

Adélio Bispo de Oliveira was arrested in the act by the Federal Police and taken to the city's central police station. After an investigation, the police concluded that he acted alone in the crime. In June 2019, de Oliveira's pre-trial detention was converted into an indefinite internment in the federal penitentiary of Campo Grande, capital city of Mato Grosso do Sul. The knife used in the attack was collected by the Federal Police and is currently on display in the corporation's museum in Brasília.

The attack has been used to spread conspiracy theories, both by Bolsonaro's supporters and critics, and even by Bolsonaro himself.

== Political context ==
Brazil was going through a period of political polarization. In 2013, large popular demonstrations, known as the June Journeys, were the culmination of the crisis of political representation and awakened the politicization of a large part of the population, which reverberated in the 2014 presidential election. During this election period, tempers flared between Workers' Party (PT) supporters and anti-PT supporters, with the country's economic crisis as an aggravating factor. New political groups with different ideologies entered the debate, increasing the polarization. Social networks such as Facebook and Twitter contributed to increasing polarization. At the end of 2013, the right united around the issue of corruption. Those on the left focused on social programs and public services. As political parties began to put these issues front and center of their platforms, the left and right drifted further apart. In August 2016, the impeachment of Dilma Rousseff split the party lines, making the polarization even greater.

Political scientist Glauco Peres da Silva, from Faculty of Philosophy, Languages and Human Sciences, University of São Paulo, in an interview from Nexo Journal, said 'in Brazil many years exist a political violence'. Bolsonaro used an aggressive discourse, but he was not the promoter of the widespread unwillingness to engage in dialog. According to the expert, it all started with the rivalry between the PT and the Brazilian Social Democracy Party (PSDB), which created jargon such as “coxinha” and “petralha”, and there was also society's inclination to lynch people rather than do justice. He lamented the way political disputes are viewed in Brazil, as if they were illegitimate, as if there couldn't be a group with divergent beliefs as well as the attitude of delegitimizing opponents. However, he opined that the attack could be a great opportunity for the candidates to call for calm and for the entire political class to declare that violence is unacceptable..

Despite the stabbing and the abrupt change of course in the candidate's campaign, who was prevented from taking to the streets and attending various events and debates, Jair Bolsonaro was the most voted candidate in the first round, on October 7, with 46.03% of the valid votes, ahead of Fernando Haddad (PT) with 29.28% of the votes. The two contested the second round on October 28, in which Bolsonaro was elected president with 55.13% of the valid votes, against Haddad's 44.87%.

== Attack ==
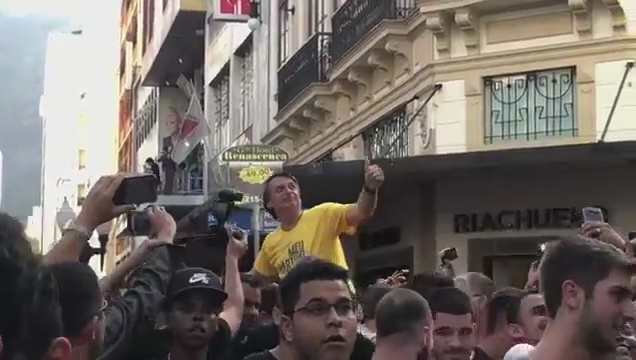
Bolsonaro before the stabbing

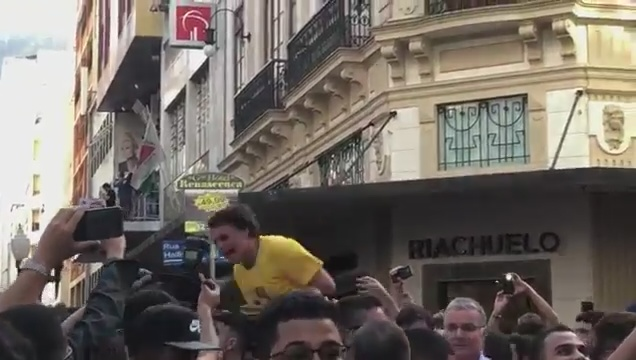
Bolsonaro after the stabbing

Jair Bolsonaro's presidential campaign schedule called for the candidate to arrive in Juiz de Fora at 11 a.m. on 6 September. He was to visit the Ascomcer Hospital and have lunch with business leaders. He would then hold a public event in front of the city's Town Hall, in Halfeld Park, from where he would go to Praça da Estação, where he would hold his rally. Like the other candidates, Bolsonaro was escorted by Federal Police (PF) officers.

Bolsonaro was stabbed while being carried on his shoulders by supporters at a campaign event in Halfeld street, one of the most important streets in the central region of the Minas Gerais city of Juiz de Fora. He was wounded in the abdomen, injuring a major abdominal vein, which caused severe bleeding. The federal deputy was taken promptly to the Santa Casa de Misericórdia of Juiz de Fora, where he was admitted to the emergency room at around 3.40 p.m., with a sharp injury to his abdomen. The candidate underwent an exploratory laparotomy.

=== Perpetrator ===
Adélio Bispo de Oliveira
- Born: Adélio Bispo de Oliveira; May 6, 1978 (age 48); Montes Claros, Minas Gerais, Brazil
- Known for: Attempted assassination of Jair Bolsonaro
- Status: Interned
- Motive: The perpetrator cited political conspiracy theories and said he acted by "Order of God".
- Criminal charge: Assassination attempt on President Jair Bolsonaro
- Penalty: Judged to be incompetent

Details
- Date: 6 September 2018 c. 15:40 BRT (UTC-03:00)
- Locations: Juiz de Fora, Minas Gerais, Brazil
- Target: Jair Bolsonaro
- Killed: 0
- Injured: 1
- Weapon: Knife

The perpetrator of the attempted murder was arrested in the act by the Federal Police and identified as Adélio Bispo de Oliveira (born Montes Claros, 6 May 1978). De Oliveira claimed to have committed the crime "at the behest of God". His Facebook profile contained criticism of the political class in general, President Michel Temer, and conspiracy theories against Freemasonry. He was a member of the Socialism and Liberty Party (PSOL) between 2007 and 2014, and was already being prosecuted for bodily injury, allegedly committed in 2013. A niece said that de Oliveira had once been an evangelical missionary and had distanced himself from his family, adding that he “had troubled ideas”.

De Oliveira was at the Clube de Tiro 38, located in the city of São José, in the metropolitan region of Florianópolis, on 5 July 2018, after receiving information that it was a place frequented by two of Jair Bolsonaro's sons, federal deputy for São Paulo Eduardo Bolsonaro and Rio de Janeiro councilman Carlos Bolsonaro.

The Federal Police investigated a volume of 2 terabytes of files, including 150 hours of video and 1,200 photos. Data from Adélio's cell phone shows that he knew the candidate's schedule and that he filmed and photographed places where the candidate would be in the city, such as the hotel where there would be a lunch with businessmen, the Juiz de Fora City Hall, FUNALFA and that he had accompanied Bolsonaro all day. He used a knife bought in Florianópolis, carried it wrapped in a newspaper and hidden inside his jacket. Two witnesses said that Adélio approached the candidate on the pretext of photographing him. After the attack, a person captured the knife and handed it over to a nearby fruit seller, who put the instrument in a plastic bag and handed it over to the Federal Police. Afterwards, forensics confirmed that the genetic profile of the blood found on the blade was Jair Bolsonaro's.

Immediately after the attack, four lawyers were hired to defend de Oliveira. The versions given by them about the financing of the defense differ. The final report of the Federal Police, in the inquiry investigating the attack on Jair Bolsonaro, should indicate that Adélio Bispo de Oliveira acted alone in deciding to attack the presidential candidate in Juiz de Fora.

After listening to more than thirty people and breaking de Oliveira's financial, telephone and telematic confidentiality, federal delegate Rodrigo Morais and his team found no evidence that de Oliveira had acted at the behest of another person or group.

Preliminary PF investigations released on 18 October 2018, found de Oliveira's ties to the Primeiro Comando da Capital (PCC), one of Brazil's main criminal organizations, including his friendship with members of the faction and the client history of Adélio Bispo de Oliveira's lawyers, which includes defending PCC members. The lawyers denied any links with the group. Shortly before the second round of the elections, which took place on October 28, the defense lawyers' financial backer(s) stopped passing on the money.

On 14 June 2019, federal judge Bruno Savino handed down Adélio's sentence, converting his pre-trial detention into indefinite internment. According to Savino, the defendant's “lack of legal liability [due to mental illness or defect] was proven” and he was therefore “exempt from punishment.” As a result, he was sent to the Federal Maximum Security Penitentiary in Campo Grande, because transferring him to the prison system, according to the sentence, “would entail a concrete risk of death.” Savino also said that Adélio had shown that he still intended to assassinate Bolsonaro.

=== Recovery ===
The complexity of the surgery Bolsonaro underwent made it impossible for him to continue campaigning in the 2018 elections in the traditional way, due to the minimum recovery time of one to two months. Shortly after the surgery, Senator Magno Malta recorded a video of Bolsonaro in his hospital bed. Bolsonaro said that he had only felt a bump, but after he realized what had happened, “the pain was unbearable”. He also said that he had “prepared for a moment like this, because you run risks”. The candidate asked: “How can human beings be so evil? I've never hurt anyone".

According to sources at the Santa Casa in Juiz de Fora, Bolsonaro lost between forty and fifty percent of the blood in his body. "An adult man like him has between five and five and a half liters", they said. He needed four bags of blood during the transfusion. According to the doctor and director of the hospital, Bolsonaro was not hit in “a region with many larger vessels” due to a matter of centimeters. The attack injured the superior mesenteric vein, as well as the large and small intestines. On September 7, Bolsonaro was transferred to Albert Einstein Israelite Hospital at around 8:20 a.m. (BRT).

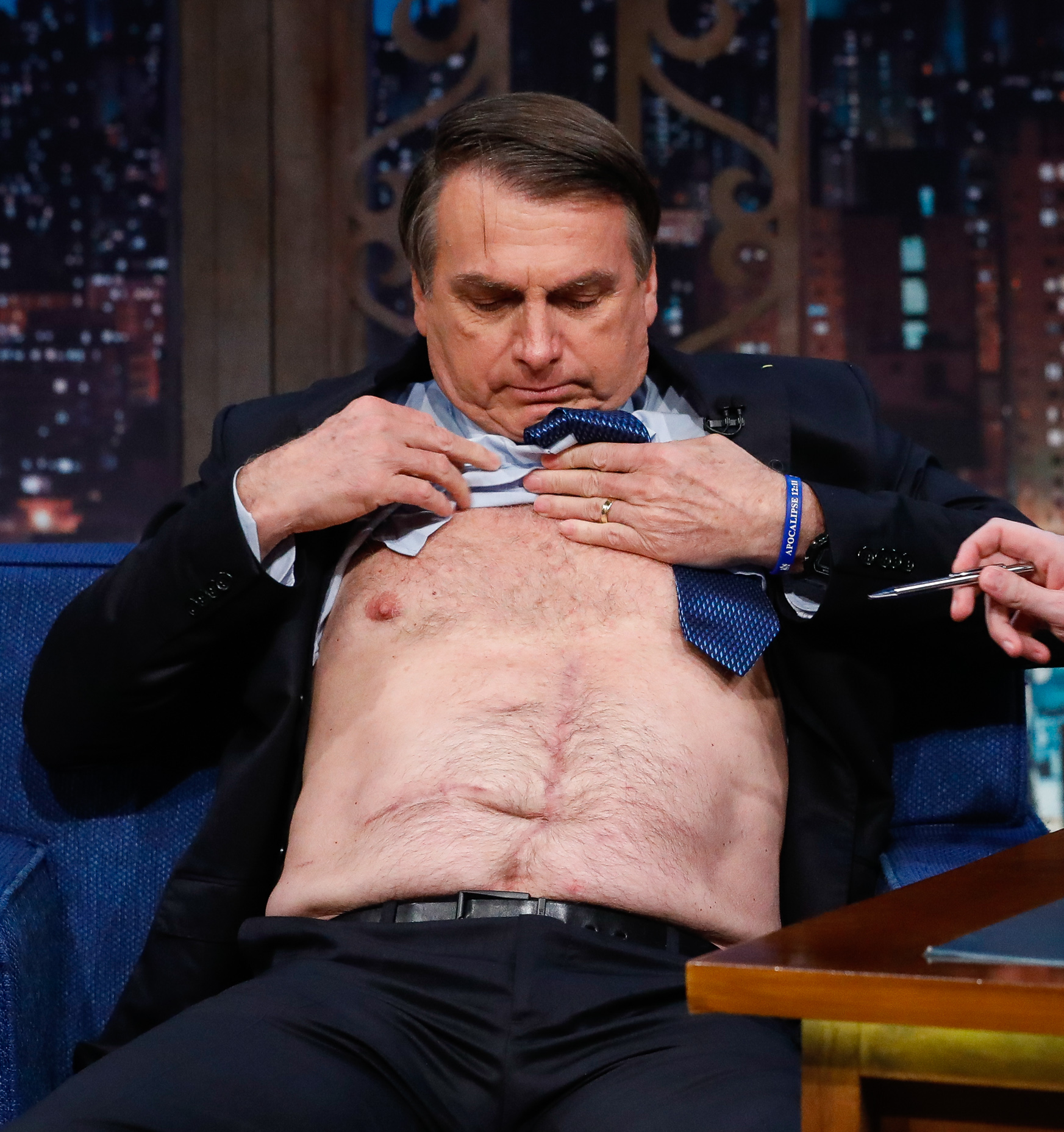
Jair Bolsonaro in May 2019 showing the scar left by the attack on the program The Noite hosted by Danilo Gentili

The first medical bulletin after the attack was released on 9 September. The bulletin said that “the abdominal condition has improved in the last 24 hours and the patient persists in intensive care and with progress in the time spent out of bed and walking". The second bulletin, released on September 10, stated that Bolsonaro's condition was serious and that another surgery would be performed in the future to reconstruct the intestinal transit and remove the colostomy bag. The bulletin released on September 11 said that Bolsonaro's intestines had improved. On the same day, Flávio Bolsonaro, Bolsonaro's eldest son, said that his father had had his first oral feeding, moving from intensive to semi-intensive recovery.

On 12 September, Bolsonaro had his oral diet suspended due to abdominal distension. On the same day, Bolsonaro underwent emergency surgery to unclog the adhesion of the intestinal walls. He progressed well after the surgery. Bolsonaro remained in stable clinical condition on the 14th and later underwent physiotherapy. The candidate also remained stable on the 15th. On 16 September, he was discharged from the ICU and moved to the semi-intensive unit.

On 19 September, Bolsonaro began oral liquid feeding. On the 20th, he underwent drainage after a CT scan indicated the presence of fluid on the side of his intestine. He began to recover bowel movements on 21 September, and was discharged from the semi-intensive care unit the following day. Bolsonaro had the drain removed from his abdomen and began receiving a light (or soft) diet from 23 September, He remained hospitalized having made good clinical progress, but had a fever on the 28th.

Bolsonaro was discharged on September 29. In the following weeks, on medical advice, he remained at home for most of the time, but was allowed to go out briefly. Because of his limitations, he continued with his political campaign, giving interviews and posting on his social networks. After not appearing in the debate held by TV Globo, his first interview after the attack was given to TV Record's Jornal da Record, at his home, in which he criticized the PT. He was also able to make a number of statements on social media.

In April to May 2025, Bolsonaro underwent further surgery and was hospitalized at the DF Star clinic in Brasilia for 17 days to fix an intestinal obstruction as a result of the assassination attempt.

=== Investigation ===
The PF concluded its investigation on 28 September 2018 and determined that Adélio Bispo de Oliveira had acted alone. The investigation analyzed images of the attack on the circuit cameras of stores and banks at the scene of the stabbing and also found that Adélio Bispo de Oliveira had tried to attack Bolsonaro beforehand. The PF said that bank secrecy breaches did not indicate suspicious money and analysis of cell phones and chips brought irrelevant information, reinforcing the indications that he acted alone. In the report, the police reported that: "[de Oliveira had] previously photographed some places where Bolsonaro would be in the city. In other photos and images found on his cell phone, it was evident that he was with the candidate throughout the day, and even had access to the hotel where a lunch with businessmen was scheduled. Therefore, there are strong elements that Adélio made a prior, thoughtful and planned decision to attempt Bolsonaro's life".

However, in a second investigation, which opened on 25 September 2018, the PF is delving deeper into de Oliveira's possible connections by analyzing more than 6,000 cell phone conversations, more than 1,000 emails and telephone data from the last five years, as well as the source of the attacker's defense funding. On 23 January 2019, the Public Prosecutor's Office extended the investigation for 90 days. On 21 December, the police served two search and seizure warrants at addresses linked to lawyer Zanone Manuel de Oliveira Júnior, responsible for Adélio Bispo de Oliveira's legal defence. The two men are not related. The lawyer stated that the identity of whomever hired him is confidential.

On 11 June 2024, the Federal Police reiterated their conclusion that Adélio Bispo de Oliveira was solely responsible for the attack on then-presidential candidate Jair Bolsonaro during a campaign event in Juiz de Fora, in the state of Minas Gerais, in 2018.

== False news and conspiracy theories ==
The attack has been used to spread conspiracy theories, both by Bolsonaro's supporters and critics. On one hand, Bolsonaro supporters created a documentary called A Facada no Mito, released on YouTube on December 22, 2018, raising points that try to contradict the version of the PF, implying that the attacker did not act alone, and may even have had Bolsonaro's own security team as accomplices. In addition, suspicions were raised about posts on social networks that suggested that other demonstrators were co-perpetrators of the crime, promoting harassment and threats against these users. The latter voluntarily went to the PF to provide clarifications and the hypotheses raised were not upheld.

On the other hand, critics of Bolsonaro questioned the authenticity of the stabbing incident, referring to it as a "fakeada" — a blend of the words "fake" and "facada" (Portuguese for "stabbing") — suggesting that the attack was staged. They claimed it was a strategy to excuse Bolsonaro from participating in political debates and to secure him greater media coverage.

=== Involvement of third parties ===
==== Socialism and Liberty Party and Jean Wyllys ====
On 6 September 2018, singer Netinho posted on his social media that the attack on Bolsonaro had been ordered by the PSOL party, accompanied by a false video showing Bolsonaro supposedly being punched in the stomach after the stabbing. The video circulated among some parts of the media, and Senator Magno Malta voiced suspicions that one of Bolsonaro's security guards might have betrayed him. Carlos Bolsonaro refuted the punch claim on Twitter, stating that the alleged security guard was a federal police officer who was simply opening the car door for Bolsonaro to enter. A Federal Police investigation confirmed the officer's identity as Luiz Felipe Félix, and it was revealed that he had to be relocated due to the hostility he faced from the false accusation. While the PSOL acknowledged Adélio's affiliation with the party, they denied any involvement in the attack. Testimonies revealed that Adélio never attended any PSOL meetings. The Federal Police inquiry concluded that “the data from phones, computers, diaries, notes, emails, and social media, as well as fieldwork and interviews, failed to produce any evidence or even suspicions of complicity or participation by members of PSOL or PSD in the attack on then-candidate Jair Messias Bolsonaro". The issue resurfaced in 2022 following the assassination of Marcelo Arruda, when Bolsonaro referenced Adélio's PSOL membership to defend himself from accusations of political violence.

The theory was supported by Ana Paula Henkel on 4 January 2022, during the "Pingos nos Is" program on Jovem Pan, suggesting that de Oliveira might have had a false alibi. At the time, Bolsonaro had just removed his nasogastric tube and was about to be discharged from the hospital.

In 2019, a false claim spread that the Federal Public Prosecutor's Office (MPF) had identified R$50,000 in deposits from Jean Wyllys to Adélio's lawyer. Despite the secrecy surrounding the deposit details, investigations concluded that de Oliveira acted alone, and Wyllys' name was never mentioned in any official inquiry.

Also in 2019, Regina Villela, a Social Liberal Party (PSL) candidate for federal deputy in Ceará, posted a video making a series of accusations against Wyllys. First, she claimed Wyllys had resigned from his political office because the new legislature did not offer parliamentary immunity. This was false, as the new legislature only changed the rules regarding "special forum" privileges for crimes committed during a mandate. She also claimed Adélio had contacted Wyllys in the Chamber of Deputies, and that there had been an attempt to fabricate an alibi to remove suspicions since there was a record of Adélio entering on the same day as the attack. The story was originally reported by the news site O Antagonista, which published that Adélio had entered the House twice on the day of the attack. However, this visit record was from 2013, and there were 432 other deputies in the same building. The Legislative Police confirmed that the disinformation stemmed from a receptionist who had mistakenly added the entry record four hours after the attack.

In May 2020, pro-Bolsonaro blogger Oswaldo Eustáquio Filho accused PSOL and Jean Wyllys of being behind the attack. He also claimed there was a photo of an activist known as "Mergulhador" with Adélio Bispo de Oliveira, and that the Federal Police had linked him to the stabbing. Eustáquio claimed he had known Mergulhador since 2016 and that he was present during the attack. On May 26, 2020, Mergulhador confirmed that a photo with Adélio had been posted on Facebook, taken at a protest against former President Michel Temer. He also stated that Adélio had complimented Wyllys and suggested that they had met in the Chamber of Deputies, a claim similar to the one made by Regina Villela. Mergulhador was questioned by the Federal Police and admitted to the photo's existence but stated that he only recalled someone mentioning Wyllys’ name. He also clarified that his interaction with de Oliveira lasted only a few seconds and that it was not proven that he was present during the stabbing. Mergulhador was ordered to pay R$20,000 in compensation to Jean Wyllys in 2022.

Oswaldo Eustáquio Filho was also convicted in February 2022 and ordered to pay R$10,000 in damages and serve four months and 20 days of open detention. Judge Telmo Zaions Zainko stated that the theory emerged from a distortion of a statement given to the Federal Police.

In 2021, it was reported that Jean Wyllys had been summoned to testify before the Federal Police in September 2018 and had fled to Barcelona to avoid justice. Wyllys, however, had been living in that city at the time.

Other prominent figures who have endorsed similar conspiracy theories included Jair Bolsonaro, Carlos Bolsonaro, Eduardo Bolsonaro, Marcos Feliciano (who was ordered to pay R$41,800 in compensation to Wyllys), Marcos do Val (also ordered to pay R$41,800, with a daily fine if he failed to delete his social media posts), Olavo de Carvalho (who was instructed to delete posts within 48 hours and pay Jean Wyllys R$10,000 if he did not comply), Bia Kicis, Bibo Nunes, Frederick Wassef, Ed Raposo, and Otávio Fakhoury. All are facing lawsuits from Wyllys. Kicis and Fakhoury are also under investigation by the Supreme Federal Court for their involvement in digital militias.

=== Worker's Party ===
==== False accusations against trade unionist ====
On 8 September 2018, Bolsonaro engineer Renato Henrique Scheidemantel accused PT banker and trade unionist Lívia Gomes Terra on his Facebook page of having given the knife used in the crime to de Oliveira. The story grew over time and they began to dissect her life on social media. They found out a lot of information about her, including her profession and phone number, and she also received threats in private messages. As a result, she reportedly developed post-traumatic stress disorder and panic disorder. She said that for the past four years, she has only left the house to go to work or had to be accompanied. Investigations by the Federal and Military Police show that on the day of the attack she was at home with a doctor's certificate recovering from an illness. Scheidemantel was sentenced to 10 months and 20 days in prison. As a first-time offender, however, his sentence was reversed to a restrictive sentence of rights and community service.

==== Silas Malafaia's false accusation against Dilma ====
In September 2018, evangelical pastor Silas Malafaia made a series of posts accusing de Oliveira of being an advisor to Dilma Rousseff, a post which had great repercussions during the elections. Dilma's press office said it would sue Malafaia for libel, slander and defamation. Then, on 10 November 2019, the pastor retracted his statement on social media, saying that he had posted fake news by accident and that Adélio actually had ties to PSOL.

==== Modified photos with members of the Workers' Party ====
In September 2018, a photo circulated on social media showing Luiz Inácio Lula da Silva, Dilma Roussef, Gleisi Hoffmann, Guilherme Boulos and Luiz Marinho with a man identified as Adélio Bispo. However, he is João Paulo Rodrigues, leader of the Landless Workers' Movement (MST). The image was originally published on 6 April 2018, on the G1 news portal, entitled "Lula spends the early hours of the morning at the ABC metalworkers' union after arrest order. It circulated again in 2020 and 2021". Another out-of-context photo that circulated was one of Gleisi Hoffmann with a supporter, posted on the party president's social networks on the same day as the attack. The supporter was identified as Adélio Bispo de Oliveira, but the photo was taken in Curitiba. The image's metadata confirms its origin. This photo circulated in 2018 and came back into vogue in 2022. In 2020, two photos of Lula with a man identified as Adélio Bispo circulated on social media. In fact, this man is orthopedic doctor Marcos Heridijanio Moura Bezerra, a candidate for federal deputy in 2018.

==== José Dirceu's sentence taken out of context ====
In 2021, Carlos Bolsonaro and other Bolsonaro supporters shared an excerpt from an interview in which ex-minister José Dirceu said that the attack on Bolsonaro “was our mistake”. In an interview for Fórum magazine, Dirceu says he was listing facts about the government and the excerpt was out of context.

==== Fake Anonymous publication ====
On 14 February 2022, claims that hacker group Anonymous had released a new statement by de Oliveira in which he admitted that he had been hired by the Workers' Party. The news was spread on Twitter by the profile @AnonNovidades, an alleged member of Anonymous. The Federal Police deny that the deposition took place. The Bolsonaro news site Terra Brasil published content based on the tweet.

==== Accusation of collusion between press and PT ====
Bolsonaro content creator Gustavo Gayer accused the PT of having hired Adélio Bispo de Oliveira and the press of covering up the case.

=== Manuela d'Ávila ===
In 2018, rumors surfaced claiming that Manuela d'Ávila, a member of the Communist Party of Brazil (PCdoB) and Fernando Haddad's running mate during the 2018 elections, made between 6 and 18 calls to Adélio Bispo de Oliveira on the same day as the attack. The original rumor appeared on the Facebook page "Partido Bolsonaro". These claims resurfaced in 2019. Manuela herself denied the story in an interview with Quebrando o Tabu. Substitute Justice of the Superior Electoral Court, Carlos Horbach, ordered Facebook to provide the IP address and other details about the page's administrators.

=== Social Democratic Party ===
It was rumored that de Oliveira had joined or tried to join the Social Democratic Party (PSD). The party was investigated, but it never happened. Adélio claims that he tried to disaffiliate from the party because he feared that he had joined in absentia.

=== Order of Attorneys of Brazil and Supreme Federal Court ===
On the day that de Oliveira was acquitted on the grounds that he was legally incompetent, a rumour emerged that he had his telephone and bank secrecy protected by the Order of Attorneys of Brazil (OAB). In fact, the confidentiality belongs to his lawyer, Zanone Manuel de Oliveira (no relation). On 21 December 2018, the Federal Police collected the lawyer's electronic equipment and documents to investigate whether Zanone had links to the PCC.

The following month, the OAB of Minas Gerais asked the Federal Regional Court of the 1st Region to suspend the analysis of the materials for violating the professional secrecy of the practice of law, a request that was granted. The Attorney General of the Union (AGU) appealed, but at the time the rumor appeared the request had not been analyzed. A video was also published in which the injunction prohibiting the analysis of Zanone's objects was actually Adélio's. Another entity that would be protecting Adélio Bispo's confidentiality would be the Supreme Federal Court.

=== Federal Police ===
In 2021, a social media post claimed that the police had recovered deleted messages from the phone of the nanny involved in the Henry Borel Medeiros case but had yet to examine Adélio Bispo de Oliveira's phone.

In reality, the Federal Police analyzed 2 terabytes of image files, 350 hours of video, 600 documents, and 700 gigabytes of media data, along with 1,200 photos obtained from cell phones, a computer, and other documents. The phone of his lawyer, Zanone Manuel de Oliveira (no relation), however, was not investigated due to a preliminary court order prohibiting its analysis.

=== Sergio Moro and Marcelo Valeixo ===
On 24 April 2020, then-Minister Sergio Moro left the Ministry of Justice, accusing President Jair Bolsonaro of interfering in the Federal Police. To justify the former judge's departure, Bolsonaro supporters started publishing conspiracy theories. In relation to Adélio Bispo, the theories claim that Moro interrupted the investigations. Alexandre Ramagem, director of Brazilian Intelligence Agency (ABIN), allegedly called Bolsonaro to say that Moro and Maurício Valeixo were hiding information about the case. Moro said that the rumors were fake news.

=== Documentary produced by Brasil 247 ===
The arguments come from a documentary by Brasil 247, Bolsonaro e Adélio - Uma Fakeada no Coração do Brasil, by investigative reporter Joaquim de Carvalho. The apparent absence of blood at the scene of the stabbing and the quick medical and police response are considered signs by proponents of the theory that the whole event was staged. However, Bolsonaro did undergo multiple hospital interventions and showed his scar on The Noite with Danilo Gentili.

The conspiracy theory was spread mainly by supporters of former president Lula, such as the activist Thiago dos Reis, and PT politicians, including Bohn Gass, Maria do Rosário, Paulo Pimenta, and Rogério Correia. Former president Luiz Inácio Lula da Silva has also expressed doubts about the attack, stating in an interview that he found the inaction of security personnel strange. In September 2021, federal deputy Alexandre Frota submitted a request to open a Parliamentary Inquiry Committee (CPI) to investigate the case. According to Cabo Daciolo, the event was "a spectacle by the Freemasonry, Silas Malafaia, and the New World Order".

The Brasil 247 documentary was removed from the YouTube platform on 10 August 2022. YouTube claimed that its hate speech policy prohibited the denial, trivialization, or minimization of historical events, including the stabbing of Jair Bolsonaro. The Workers' Cause Party (PCO) condemned the action, calling it censorship.

== Repercussions ==
Shortly after the event, numerous fake accounts impersonating Adélio were created on social media. The criminal's official profile on Facebook had already amassed over 9,500 followers two hours after his arrest. On Twitter, the attack was mentioned 808,000 times within two hours, according to the Fundação Getulio Vargas (FGV). The incident became the most discussed topic on the platform in twelve countries, ranging from Argentina to Spain, including the United States and Bahrain.

President Michel Temer described the attack as intolerable, reiterating his outrage at the lack of harmonious coexistence in a democratic rule of law, where a peaceful campaign should be feasible. Other presidential candidates canceled their respective agendas for 7 September, the day following the event. They all issued statements condemning the attack and demanded investigations into the incident.

Eliseu Padilha, stated that the stabbing struck "at the heart" of democracy. The minister of the Secretariat of the Presidency, Ronaldo Fonseca, also strongly condemned the episode. General Hamilton Mourão, Bolsonaro's running mate, commented that the campaign needed to "put an end to the victimization" surrounding the attack.

== See also ==
- Rua Tonelero shooting
- Jair Bolsonaro 2018 presidential campaign
- Attempted assassination of Donald Trump
