= Livres (movement) =

Free Livres
- President: Magno Karl
- Founders: Sérgio Bivar Mano Ferreira; Felipe Melo França Fabio Ostermann
- Founded: 2016; 10 years ago
- Split from: Social Liberal Party
- Headquarters: São Paulo
- Membership: 5000
- Ideology: Liberalism
- Political position: Centre-right
- Colours: Purple

Website
- eusoulivres.org

Livres (Portuguese: Free) is a Brazilian economic liberal political movement. The political scientist Magno Karl is Livres' current executive director. Livres has 25 members holding public office positions, among them one senator (Rodrigo Cunha from the Brazilian Social Democracy Party in Alagoas), seven federal deputies, and eight state deputies and nine city councillors, along with economists, political scientists, and more than three thousand registered activists.

Livres went on to grow as a liberal wing of the PSL and control the party's political agenda, communication, and 13 out of its 27 state directories. Inspired by Livres' liberal approach, notable Brazilian public intellectuals, such as political scientist Fábio Ostermann and journalist Leandro Narloch, openly supported the PSL. In January 2018, Livres split from the PSL after conservative Jair Bolsonaro joined the party. The PSL subsequently dropped social liberalism altogether from its platform, adopting national conservatism and social conservatism. Today, Livres is not a party but a political movement. Although many politicians are still members of the organisation, Livres does not run its own candidates and instead acts as a pressure group supporting cultural liberalism and economic liberal candidates and policies.

== History ==
Livres was founded by Sérgio Bivar and his supporters in late 2015 as an internal economic liberal tendency within the PSL. The initial goal of Livres was to reform the PSL following the 2018 Brazilian general election and modernize the PSL's platform. After Bolsonaro joined the PSL, Livres split with the PSL, claiming Bolsonaro's ultranationalism policies were incompatible with the organization.

After leaving the PSL, Livres announced it would become a non-partisan political movement, with members and supporters free to join any political party in Brazil, provided they followed the 17 principles of the movement. Of the 43 members who were seeking election in 2018, thirteen went to the New Party, eight went to CIDADANIA, seven to Podemos, seven to the Party of National Mobilization, three to the Sustainability Network, two to the Democrats, two to the Green Party, and one to Solidariedade.

In the 2018 Brazilian general election, Livres elected one Senator (Rodrigo Cunha, PSDB, Alagoas), two members of Congress (Tiago Mitraud, Novo, Minas Gerais and Marcelo Calero, Cidadania, Rio de Janeiro) and five members of Legislative Assemblies (Fábio Ostermann, Novo, Rio Grande do Sul; Bruno Souza, PSB, Santa Catarina; Davi Maia, DEM, Alagoas; Guilherme da Cunha, Novo, Minas Gerais; and Daniel José, Novo, São Paulo). In total, Livres-backed candidates received more than 2.5 million votes. After the elections, 9 more elected politicians joined: five federal deputy (Franco Cartafina of Minas Gerais; Daniel Coelho of Pernambuco; Pedro Cunha Lima of Paraíba; Gilson Marques of Santa Catarina; Alex Manente of São Paulo) and four state deputy (Chicão Bulhões of Rio de Janeiro; Julia Lucy of Federal District (Brazil); Laura Serrano of Minas Gerais; Giuseppe Riesgo of Rio Grande do Sul).

With the election of Bolsonaro as President of Brazil, the party adopted a position of independence and defense of freedom as a whole and for all people.
