= Jair Bolsonaro 2018 presidential campaign =

Brazilian presidential campaign

- Campaign: 2018 Brazilian general election
- Candidate: Jair Bolsonaro; Federal Deputy from Rio de Janeiro (1991–2018); Hamilton Mourão; Brazilian Army member (1969–2018)
- Affiliation: Social Liberal Party; Coalition partner Brazilian Labour Renewal Party
- Status: Announced: 3 March 2016; Presumptive nominee: 12 March 2018; Official nominee: 22 July 2018; Qualified for run-off: 7 October 2018; Won the election: 28 October 2018; Inaugurated: 1 January 2019
- Key people: Paulo Guedes (Economic advisor); Gustavo Bebianno (Legal advisor)
- Receipts: BRL 4.150.097,17
- Slogan(s): Brasil acima de tudo, Deus acima de todos (Brazil above everything, God above everyone)

Website
- www.bolsonaro.com.br

The 2018 presidential campaign of Jair Bolsonaro was announced on 3 March 2016. Brazilian federal deputy and former military officer Jair Bolsonaro became the official nominee of the Social Liberal Party during their convention on 22 July 2018. The running mate decision came later on 8 August, when General Hamilton Mourão was chosen to compose the ticket with Bolsonaro. By choosing Mourão as running mate Bolsonaro secured a coalition with the Brazilian Labour Renewal Party.

Jair Bolsonaro was the first candidate for the presidency that was able to raise over $1 million reais in donations from the public during the 2018 campaign. In the first 59 days, he amassed an average of $17,000 reais per day in donations.

Bolsonaro was stabbed on 6 September while he was campaigning in Juiz de Fora. He recovered, and was the leading candidate in the first round on 7 October, with 46% of the vote. On 28 October, Bolsonaro won the general election with 55.13% of the popular vote.

== Presidential ticket ==
Social Liberal Party ticket
Jair Bolsonaro	Hamilton Mourão
for President	for Vice President
Federal Deputy from Rio de Janeiro (1991–2019)	Brazilian Army General (1969–2018)

== Running mate selection process ==
Numerous politicians were mentioned as potential vice presidential running mates for Bolsonaro. In addition to General Hamilton Mourão, who was eventually chosen, figures mentioned as possible running mates for Bolsonaro included:

- Marcos Pontes, a famous astronaut and member of the PSL who would eventually become Bolsonaro's Minister of Science, Technology and Innovation.
- Janaina Paschoal, a law professor at the University of São Paulo who helped initiate the Impeachment of Dilma Rousseff; Paschoal would later be elected to the Legislative Assembly of São Paulo.
- Luiz Philippe de Orleans e Bragança, a member of the Brazilian imperial family and descendant of Emperor Pedro II; Luiz Philippe would later be elected to the Chamber of Deputies.
- Augusto Heleno, a retired General in the Brazilian Army who would eventually become Bolsonaro's Secretary of Institutional Security.
- Marcelo Álvaro Antônio, member of the Chamber of Deputies from Minas Gerais who would eventually become Bolsonaro's Minister of Tourism
- Magno Malta, Senator from Espírito Santo

== Primary elections ==
The National Executive Committee of Social Liberal Party, and the National Executive Committee of the Brazilian Labour Renewal Party, elected the candidate for office of vice-president and the National Directory of PSL, elected the candidate to President of republic. Karina Rodrigues Fidelix da Cruz (PRTB), appointed by PRTB, and Julian Lemos (PSL), appointed by PSL, were the delegates of the coalition. Gustavo Bebiano Rocha was the representative of the slate for the Supreme Electoral Court. Janaína Paschoal refused to be the vice-president candidate together Bolsonaro.

Office	Date	Candidate	Number of Votes	%	Notes
PSL primaries
President	July 22	Jair Bolsonaro	96	100%	
Vice-president	August 4	Luiz Philippe of Orléans-Braganza	11	100%	Aborted result
PRTB primaries
Vice-president	August 5	Hamilton Mourão	26	100%	

== Campaign background ==
Before his campaign, Bolsonaro desired that the senator Magno Malta (from the Party of Republic) or Augusto Heleno (from the Progressive Republican Party) become the vice-president in his slate, but their parties did not allow the two of them to compete together.

During his campaign, Bolsonaro has praised the two-decade (1964-1985) military dictatorship in Brazil and has praised foreign autocrats such as Alberto Fujimori of Peru and Augusto Pinochet of Chile. Bolsonaro has promised to give police permission to shoot first and ask questions later. His platform also promotes liberalizing gun laws and repressive tactics against urban criminality and drug trafficking, along with the advocation of rolling back affirmative action for black-Brazilians and reversing legislation which increases sentences for murdering women because of their gender (femicide).

Despite earlier calls for massive policy shifts in environmentalism, Bolsonaro backed away from calls to pull Brazil out of the Paris Agreements, and the elimination of Brazil's Environmental Ministry. However he told international non-profit groups such as the World Wildlife Fund, that he would not allow their agendas in Brazil, strongly protested against lands reserved for indigenous tribes, and plans to expand nuclear and hydroelectric power into the Amazon.

Some supporters of Bolsonaro have compared him to US President Donald Trump, and believe that he, like Trump, will bring the radical change that they feel is needed in response to the "lawlessness" of Brazil, with many nicknaming Bolsonaro "the legend." Steve Bannon (chief executive officer of Trump's 2016 presidential bid) has advised Bolsonaro's campaign.

=== Social media ===
Social media made a large impact on Bolsonaro's campaign and at the time of the election he had over 4.3 million followers and many support pages on Facebook along with over 400 thousand followers on Instagram, making him one of the candidates with the largest support on social media. He made daily posts related to army topics and aimed at the Partido dos Trabalhadores (PT) and also interacted with many supporters through posts, replies, and groups on WhatsApp. During the election Bolsonaro faced allegations that some of his important financial supporters illegally used WhatsApp as means to spread fake news about his opponent Haddad, prompting the company to ban thousands of active accounts during the election period. His supporters have been credited as being extremely active on social media and disseminate most content throughout WhatsApp as almost 93% of them claim to have accounts where almost 43% are politically active in the App.

=== Voter Demographic ===
Bolsonaro's supporters were primarily aged between 16 and 34 years old at about 60% of his voters, almost 30% of which were 24 years old or younger.

=== Endorsements ===
Click "show" to view the list
- ==== Celebrities ====
- Brazilian professional footballer Ronaldinho.
- Brazilian professional footballer Lucas Moura.
- Brazilian professional footballer Felipe Melo.
- Brazilian professional footballer Jádson
- Brazilian professional footballer Rivaldo.
- Retired Brazilian professional footballer and 2002 world cup champion Kaká.
- Retired Brazilian professional footballer and 1994 and 2002 world cup champion Cafu.
- Brazilian volleyball player Wallace de Souza.
- Brazilian volleyball player Maurício Souza,
- Singer and songwriter Gusttavo Lima.
- Singer and songwriter Zezé Di Camargo.
- Singer and songwriter Eduardo Costa.
- Conductor Eduardo Lages.
- Professional MMA fighter and former UFC champion José Aldo
- Professional MMA fighter and former PRIDE champion Wanderlei Silva
- Professional MMA fighter and former UFC champion Anderson Silva
- Mixed Martial artists Paulo Costa, Thiago Tavares, Darren Till, Warlley Alves, Jacare Souza
- Comedian and television host Danilo Gentili.
- Comedian and television host Ratinho.
- Humorist Jonathan Nemer.
- Actor Alexandre Frota.
- Makeup artists Augustin Fernandez and Lili Ferraz.
- Actor Sandro Rocha.
- Actor Carlos Vereza.
- Actor Mário Gomes.
- Actress Regina Duarte.
- Businessman, owner of Havan stores, Luciano Hang.
- Advertising entrepreneur and presenter Roberto Justus.
- Philosopher Olavo de Carvalho.
- Singer-songwriter Lobão.
- Astronaut Marcos Pontes.
- Formula One-winning racing driver Emerson Fittipaldi.
- Brazilian pastor and Contemporary Christian Music singers Ana Paula Valadão and André Valadão.
- Brazilian pastors Silas Malafaia, Cláudio Duarte, R. R. Soares and Edir Macedo.
- Rabbi Henry Sobel
  ==== Brazilian politicians ====
- Parliamentary Agricultural Front
- Former PSDB's vice presidential candidate and incumbent federal senator, PP's Ana Amélia (second round)
- Former MDB governor of Rio Grande do Sul José Ivo Sartori (second round)
- PSDB's São Paulo governor-elect João Doria (second round)
- PSC's Rio de Janeiro governor-elect Wilson Witzel
- NOVO's Minas Gerais governor-elect Romeu Zema (second round)
- PSDB's Rio Grande do Sul governor-elect Eduardo Leite (second round)
- Dem's Federal deputy-elect and leader of the Free Brazil Movement, Kim Kataguiri (second round)
- PSL's federal deputy-elect and member of the Brazilian imperial family, Luiz Philippe of Orléans-Braganza
- PSL's federal deputy-elect and journalist Joice Hasselmann
- PR's incumbent federal senator Magno Malta
  ==== International politicians and figures ====
- Chilean president Sebastián Piñera.
- Chilean senators Jacqueline van Rysselberghe and José Durana.
- Chilean former presidential candidate José Antonio Kast.
- Italian deputy prime minister Matteo Salvini.
- Argentinian president Mauricio Macri.
- American former Grand Wizard of the Ku Klux Klan, David Duke.
- Former White House Chief Strategist and former executive chairman of Breitbart News, Steve Bannon.
- United States President Donald Trump
- President of Colombia Ivan Duque
  ==== Media ====
- The Washington Examiner.

=== Polls ===
As of late September, Bolsonaro led the polls with 28% of polled voters, with an Ibope poll (22-24 September) stating that 36% of men surveyed said they would vote for him, while only 18% of women backing his policies. A Datafolha poll released on 10 September showed that Bolsonaro was rejected by 49% of female voters, but supported by 17%. In the first round of elections on 7 October, Bolsonaro received 46.03% of the vote, the most of any candidate.

The day before the election, polls gave Bolsonaro an 8-10% advantage over Fernando Haddad.

== Attack during campaign event ==
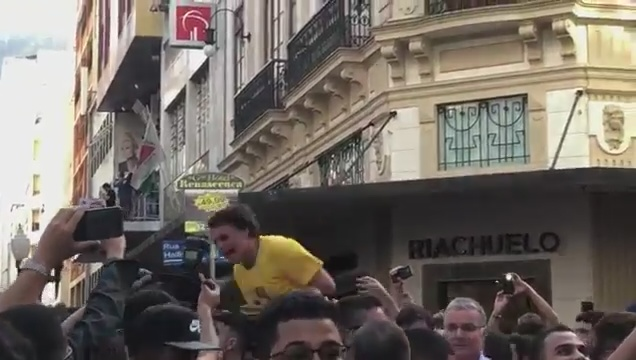
Bolsonaro being stabbed at a Juiz de Fora rally

Bolsonaro was stabbed on 6 September 2018 while campaigning and interacting with supporters in the city of Juiz de Fora, Minas Gerais. Bolsonaro's son, Flávio, has stated that his father's wounds were only superficial and he was recovering in hospital. Police arrested and identified the attacker as Adelio Bispo de Oliveira, who claimed that he was "ordered by God to carry out the attack". Flávio Bolsonaro later stated that the wounds inflicted seem worse than initially thought. He tweeted about his father's condition, explaining that the perforation reached part of the liver, the lung and part of the intestine. He also stated that Bolsonaro had lost a large amount of blood, arriving at the hospital with a pressure of 10/3, but had since stabilized. Most of the other candidates in the presidential race (from both sides of the political spectrum), and the then Brazilian president, Michel Temer, condemned the attack.

After the end of the elections, Bolsonaro decided to donate the rest of the money collected in the campaign, to the Santa Casa de Misericórdia Hospital, where he got hospital treatment after the assassination attempt.

== Protests and rallies ==
=== Protests ===
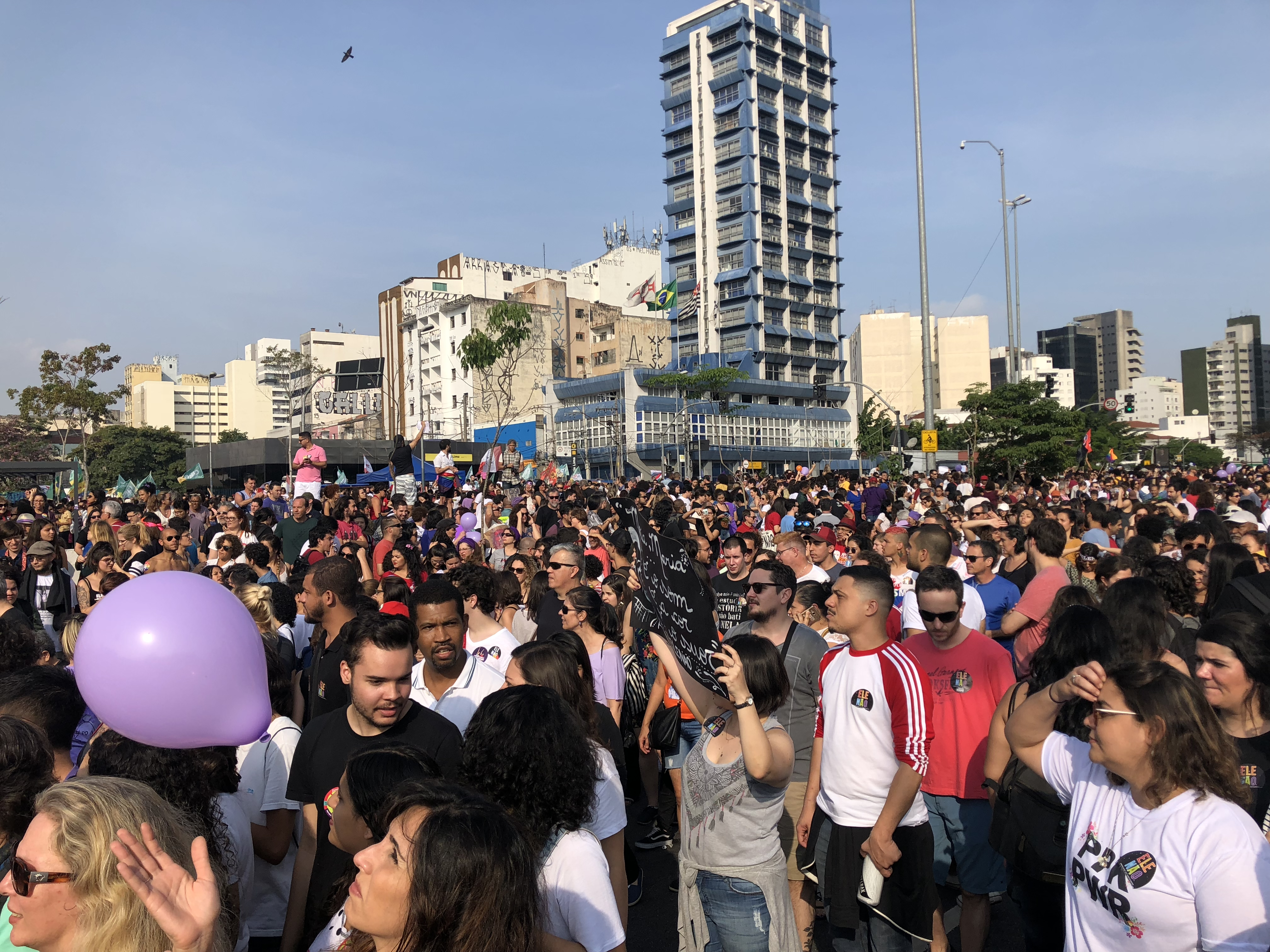
#EleNão (Not him) protest in São Paulo

Hundreds of thousands of women across Brazil staged protests on September 29, against Bolsonaro's candidacy. One protester told reporters "I'm part of a portion of society that is greatly affected by the types of things [Bolsonaro] says and thinks. This conservative wave, which has really always existed in Brazil, needs to come to an end." Protesters in São Paulo, Rio de Janeiro and Brasília chanted "Ele Não (Not him!)" which has become a slogan to protest Bolsonaro, emphasizing that the groups aims are for the undecided voters to vote "for anyone else, but not him." Many protesters have expressed outrage over past statements by Bolsonaro that homosexuality was equated with paedophilia, and that he once told Congresswoman Maria do Rosario that she wasn't worth raping, citing these events as reasons to protest his campaign.

=== Bolsomito ===
Bolsomito 2K18 (later renamed Bolsomito), is a 2D beat 'em up video game by Brazilian developer BS Studios, released for Microsoft Windows in October 2018. The game reportedly promotes the ideology of Brazilian politician Jair Bolsonaro (who is also referred to as "Bolsomito"). The game and Bolsonaro's ideology have been criticized by the press for being racist, misogynistic and homophobic. The game's availability on Steam caused Brazil's Public Ministry of Federal Districts and Territories to investigate BS Studios and Valve for potentially harming the 2018 general election.

=== Rallies ===
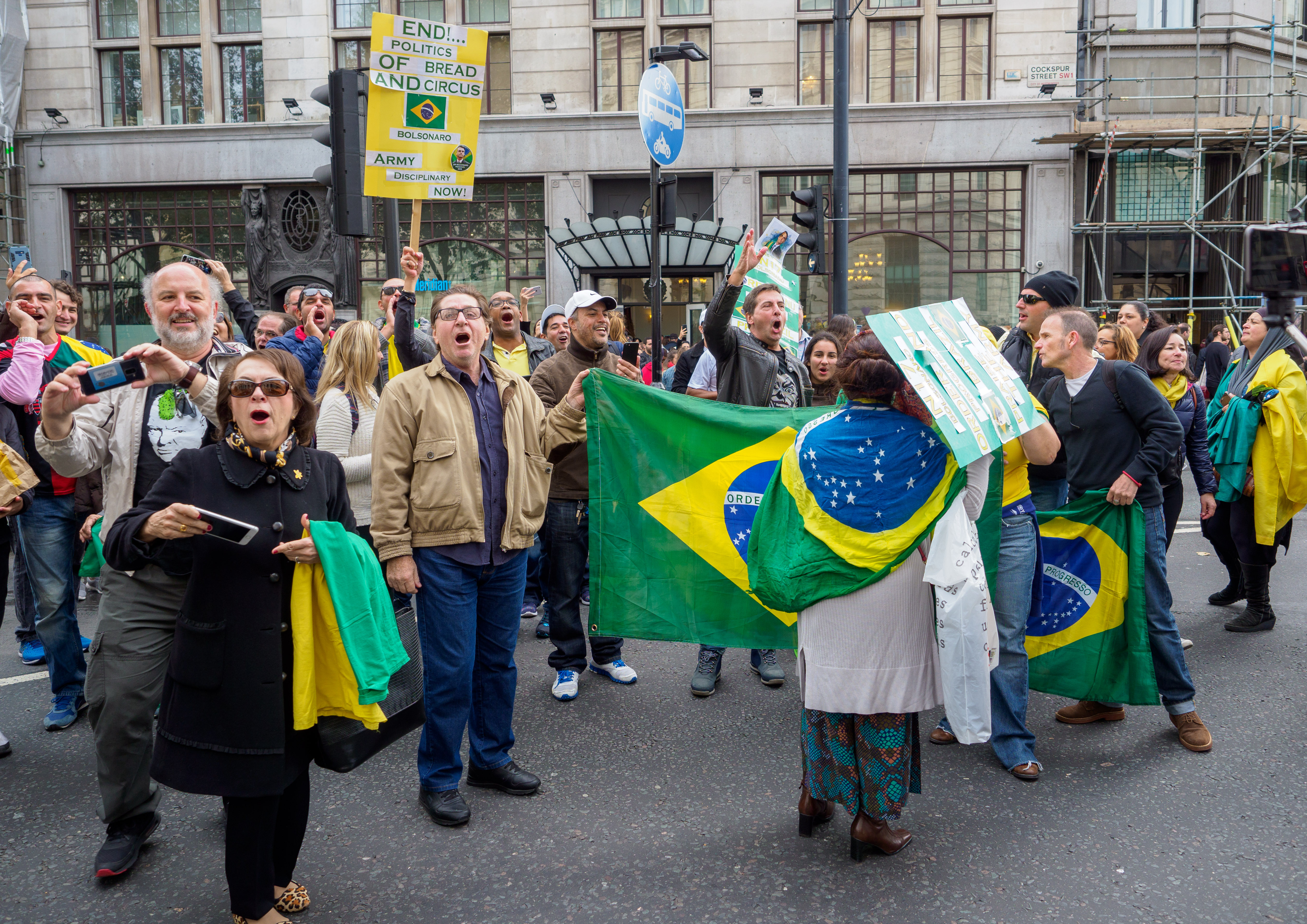
Pro-Bolsonaro demonstration in London

There were also rallies in support of the candidate in sixteen states.

== Election result ==
=== Presidential elections ===
Election year	Candidate	First round		Second round	
Election year	Candidate	# of overall votes	% of overall vote	# of overall votes	% of overall vote
2018	Jair Bolsonaro	49,276,990	46.0 #1	57,774,302	55.15 #1

== Achievements ==
The campaign receipts were R$4.001.413,01 while the costs summed R$2.456.215,03. Bolsonaro had the cheapest campaign among the main candidates. The cost per vote was R$0,03 against R$0,73 of his opponent Haddad. At the end, he tried to donate the remaining value to Santa Casa de Misericórdia Hospital but was not possible according to the election laws. About R$1.300.000,00 was raised by people in social medias to thanks Santa Casa Hospital.

== Party representation ==
- Social Liberal Party (Brazil)
- Brazilian Labour Renewal Party

== See also ==
- Presidency of Jair Bolsonaro
- Jair Bolsonaro 2022 presidential campaign
- Controversies involving Jair Bolsonaro
- Dark Horse (2026 film) (The film chronicles the political ascension of Jair Bolsonaro during his 2018 presidential campaign)
