= Silvia Waiãpi =

Brazilian politician (born 1975)

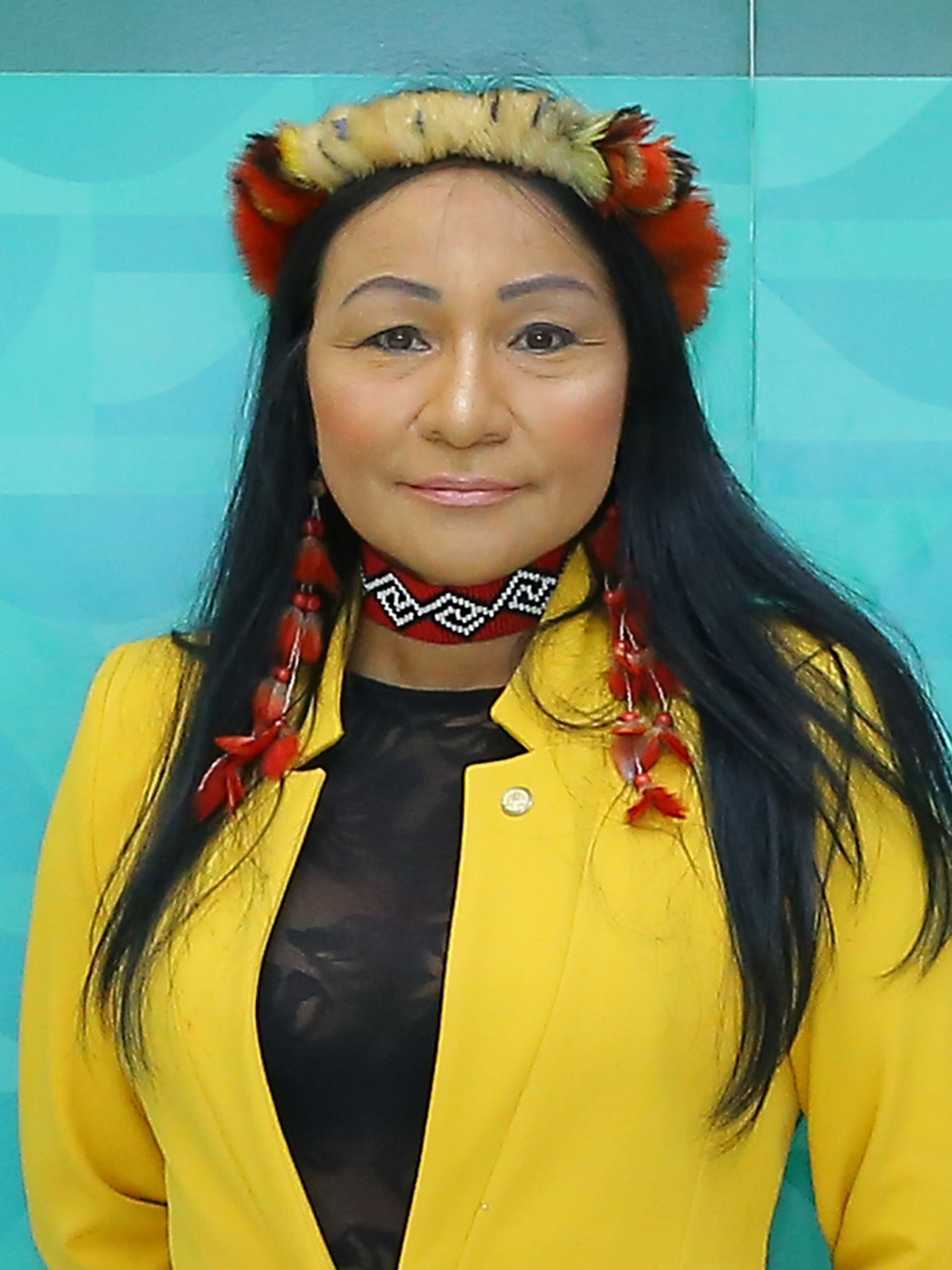
- Waiãpi in 2023

Federal Deputy
- In office 1 February 2023 – 31 July 2025
- Constituency: Amapá

Personal details
- Born: Silvia Nobre Lopes; 29 August 1975 (age 51) Macapá, Amapá, Brazil
- Party: PL (since 2022)
- Other political affiliations: PSL (2018–2022); UNIÃO (2022)

Military service
- Allegiance: Brazil
- Branch/service: Brazilian Army
- Rank: First lieutenant

Silvia Nobre Lopes, better known as Silvia Waiãpi (born 29 August 1975), is a Brazilian politician who had served as a member of the Chamber of Deputies from 2023 to 2025.
