= Bulhões =

Bulhões is a Portuguese surname. Notable people with the surname include:

- Antonio Bulhões (born 1968), Brazilian politician
- Chicão Bulhões (born 1988), Brazilian politician
- Fernando de Bulhões (1195–1231), birth name of Portuguese Catholic saint Anthony of Padua
- Renilde Bulhões (born 1947), Brazilian physician and politician

== See also ==
- Leopoldo de Bulhões, municipality in Goiás, Brazil
