= Fábio Câmara =

Brazilian politician

Councilman of São Luís
- In office January 1, 2013 – January 1, 2017

Personal details
- Born: Fábio Rogério Barbosa Câmara; September 24, 1972 (age 53) São Luís, MA
- Party: PSL
- Profession: Politician

Fábio Rogério Barbosa Câmara (born September 24, 1972, in São Luís) is a Brazilian politician. He was alderman of São Luís and candidate for mayor of São Luís.
