= Gustavo Bebianno =

Brazilian lawyer (1964–2020)

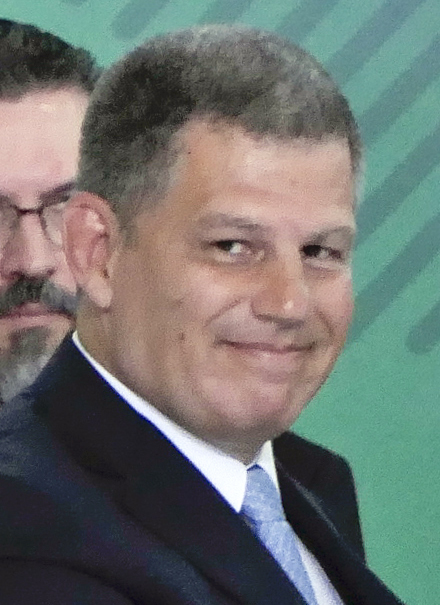
- Bebianno during his swearing in ceremony on 1 January 2019.

General Secretary of the Presidency
- In office 1 January 2019 – 18 February 2019
- President: Jair Bolsonaro
- Preceded by: Ronaldo Fonseca
- Succeeded by: Floriano Peixoto Vieira Neto

Vice President of the Social Liberal Party
- In office 28 October 2018 – 1 January 2019
- President: Luciano Bivar
- Preceded by: Julian Lemos
- Succeeded by: Antônio Rueda

Acting President of the Social Liberal Party
- In office 5 March 2018 – 28 October 2018
- Vice President: Julian Lemos
- Preceded by: Luciano Bivar
- Succeeded by: Luciano Bivar

Personal details
- Born: Gustavo Bebianno Rocha; 18 January 1964 Rio de Janeiro, Rio de Janeiro, Brazil
- Died: 14 March 2020 (aged 56) Teresópolis, Rio de Janeiro, Brazil
- Party: PSDB (2019–20)
- Other political affiliations: PSL (2018–19)
- Education: Pontifical Catholic University of Rio de Janeiro (LL.B.)
- Profession: Lawyer

Gustavo Bebianno Rocha (18 January 1964 – 14 March 2020) was a Brazilian lawyer and advisor to President Jair Bolsonaro (PSL). Bebianno became Acting Chairman of the Social Liberal Party in March 2018 after Luciano Bivar registered to run for federal deputy in the 2018 elections.

== Biography ==
Bebianno began his graduation in Law in the Pontifical Catholic University of Rio de Janeiro (PUC-Rio), but dropped out in 1990. In the same year, he moved to Miami to give Brazilian jiu-jitsu classes after reaching black belt. Four years later, he returned to Rio to finish his studies. In 2014, Gustavo offered his services as lawyer to then federal deputy Jair Bolsonaro, but the congressman kindly refused, accepting only three years later, in 2017, to support him in his presidential campaign.

After joining the Social Liberal Party in March 2018, Bebianno was appointed Acting National Chairman after the temporary leave of Luciano Bivar, president and founder of the PSL.

On 28 October 2018 he stepped down as party chairman and Bivar retook his office.

On 21 November 2018, almost a month after Bolsonaro's win in the 2018 election, Bebianno was announced Secretary-General of the Presidency.

On 15 February 2019, President Bolsonaro decided to fire Bebianno after a scheme in which a federal deputy candidate received 400,000 BRL (125336.84 USD) from a public fund and got only 274 votes in the 2018 election, when Bebianno was the PSL National President. Bebianno claimed to have formal documentation for all the funds he requested at direction by the State.

On 14 March 2020, Bebianno died suddenly in Teresópolis, Rio de Janeiro due to a heart attack.

Political offices
Preceded by Ronaldo Fonseca	Secretary-General of the Presidency; 2019	Succeeded by Floriano Peixoto Vieira Neto
Party political offices
Preceded by Julian Lemos	National Vice-President of the Social Liberal Party; 2018–2019	Succeeded by Antônio Rueda
Preceded by Luciano Bivar	National President of the Social Liberal Party; Acting; 2018	Succeeded by Luciano Bivar
