= Julian Lemos =

Brazilian politician (born 1976)

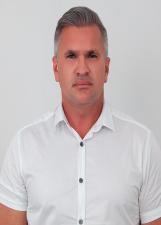
- Lemos in 2022

Member of the Chamber of Deputies
- In office 1 February 2019 – 31 January 2023
- Constituency: Paraíba

Personal details
- Born: 5 January 1976 (age 50)
- Party: Brazil Union (since 2022)
- Other political affiliations: Social Liberal Party (2018–2022)

Gulliem Charles Bezerra Lemos (born 5 January 1976), better known as Julian Lemos, is a Brazilian politician. From 2019 to 2023, he was a member of the Chamber of Deputies. He previously served as vice president of the Social Liberal Party, as coordinator of the Jair Bolsonaro's 2018 presidential campaign in the Northeast Region, and as a member of Bolsonaro's political transition team.
