= Fábio Rueda =

Brazilian politician (born 1977)

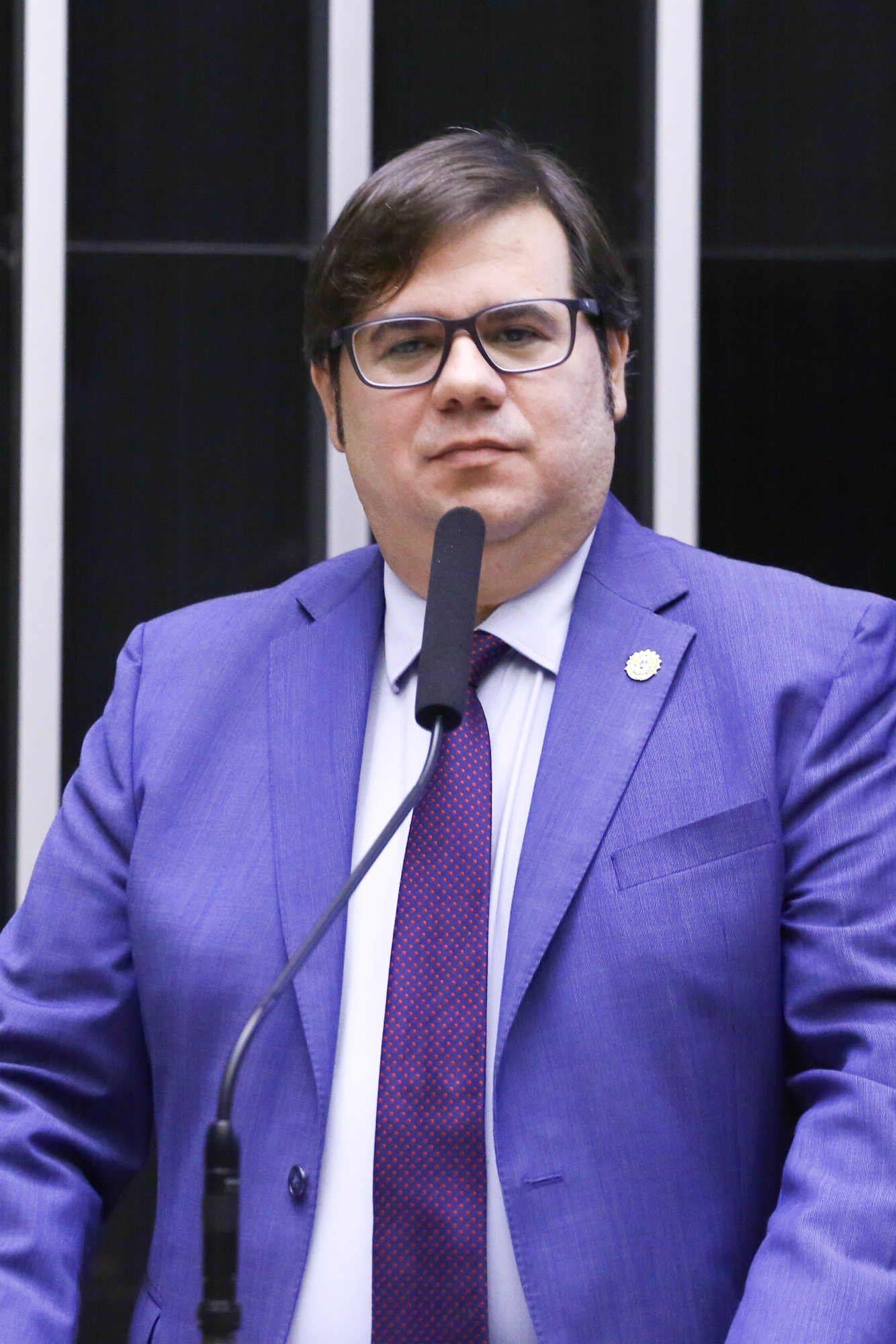

Member-elect of the Chamber of Deputies
- Assuming office 1 February 2027
- Constituency: Acre
- In office 14 December 2023 – 12 April 2024
- Constituency: Acre

Personal details
- Born: Fábio Gonçalves de Rueda; 14 July 1977 (age 49) Recife, Pernambuco, Brazil
- Party: UNIÃO (since 2022)
- Relatives: Antônio Rueda (brother)
- Education: Federal University of Pernambuco

Fábio Gonçalves de Rueda (born 14 July 1977) is a Brazilian politician. From 2023 to 2024, he was a member of the Chamber of Deputies. He is the brother of Antônio Rueda.
