= Antônio Rueda =

Brazilian politician (born 1975)

Member-elect of the Chamber of Deputies
- Assuming office 1 February 2027
- Constituency: Rio de Janeiro

President of Brazil Union
- Incumbent
- Assumed office 11 June 2024
- Vice President: ACM Neto
- Preceded by: Luciano Bivar

Vice President of Brazil Union
- In office 8 February 2022 – 29 February 2024
- President: Luciano Bivar
- Succeeded by: ACM Neto

Personal details
- Born: Antônio Eduardo Gonçalves de Rueda; 5 August 1975 (age 51) Recife, Pernambuco, Brazil
- Party: UNIÃO (2022–present)
- Other political affiliations: PSL (2000–2022)
- Relatives: Fábio Rueda (brother)
- Profession: Lawyer

Antônio Eduardo Gonçalves de Rueda (born 5 August 1975) is a Brazilian politician serving as president of the Brazil Union since 2024. He has served as president of the Progressive Union since 2025, the first year of which was with co-president Ciro Nogueira. In 2018, he served as acting president of the Social Liberal Party. He is a candidate for the Chamber of Deputies in the 2026 election. He is the brother of Fábio Rueda.

Party political offices
New political party	Vice President of Brazil Union; 2022–2024	Succeeded by ACM Neto
Preceded by Luciano Bivar	President of Brazil Union; 2024–present	Incumbent
