= Luciano Bivar =

Brazilian politician and businessman (born 1944)

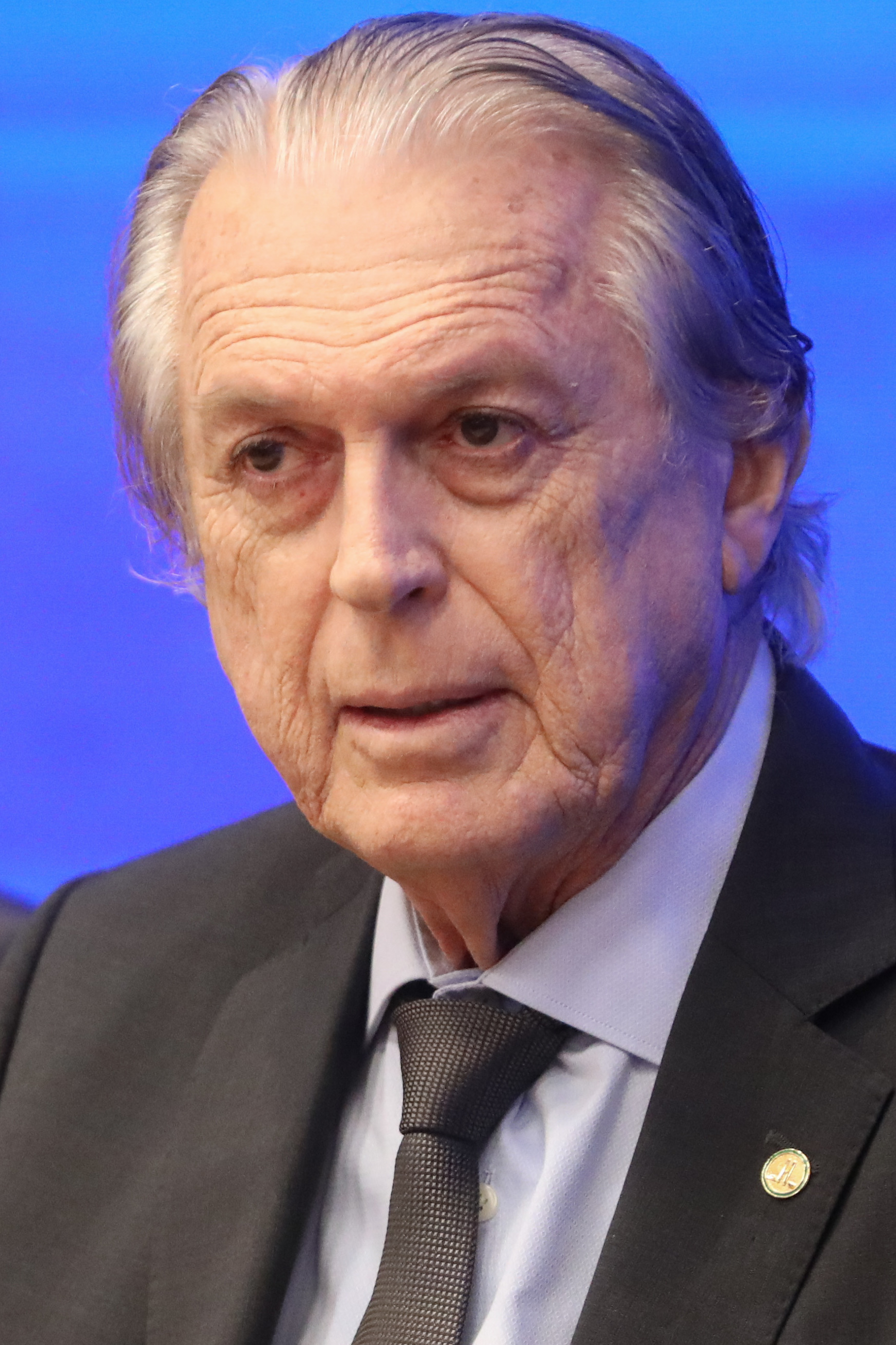
- Bivar in 2023

Member of the Chamber of Deputies
- Incumbent
- Assumed office 1 February 2019
- Constituency: Pernambuco
- In office 17 July 2017 – 10 April 2018
- Constituency: Pernambuco
- In office 1 February 1999 – 1 February 2003
- Constituency: Pernambuco

Parliamentary offices
- 2021–present: First Secretary of the Chamber of Deputies
- 2019–2021: Second Vice President of the Chamber of Deputies

Party political offices
- 2021–2024: President of UNIÃO
- 2018–2022: President of PSL
- 1998–2018: President of PSL

Personal details
- Born: Luciano Caldas Bivar; 29 November 1944 (age 81) Recife, Pernambuco, Brazil
- Party: UNIÃO (since 2022)
- Other political affiliations: PL (1990–1997); PSL (1997–2022)
- Parents: Milton de Lyra Bivar (father); Hermínia Caldas (mother)

Luciano Caldas Bivar (born 29 November 1944) is a Brazilian politician and businessman. He is current a Deputy for Pernambuco as well as leader of the Brazil Union. Previously he was Social Liberal Party presidential candidate for the 2006 Brazilian general election. He received 0.06% of the total vote and did not progress to the second round. He was President of the Social Liberal Party from 2018 until it merged with the Democrats to become the Brazil Union.

Born in Recife, Bivar was the president of Sport Club do Recife from 1989 to 1990, from 1997 to 2001, from 2005 to 2006, and in 2013.

Political offices
Preceded by André Fufuca	Second Vice President of the Chamber of Deputies; 2019–2021	Succeeded by André de Paula
Preceded by Soraya Santos	First Secretary of the Chamber of Deputies; 2021–present	Incumbent
Party political offices
New political party	National President of the Social Liberal Party; 1998–2018; 2018–2022	Succeeded by Gustavo Bebianno
Preceded by Gustavo Bebianno	National President of the Social Liberal Party; 1998–2018; 2018–2022	Party merged
New political party	National President of the Brazil Union; 2021–2024	Succeeded by Antônio Rueda
New political party	PSL nominee for President of Brazil; 2006	Succeeded by Jair Bolsonaro
