= Bibo Nunes =

Brazilian politician

Alcibio Mesquita Bibo Nunes
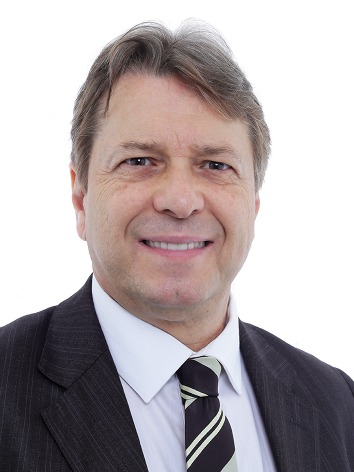
- Nunes in 2023

Member of the Chamber of Deputies
- Incumbent
- Assumed office 1 February 2019
- Constituency: Rio Grande do Sul

Member of the Municipal Chamber of Cruz Alta
- In office 1 January 1983 – 1 January 1986
- Constituency: At-large

Personal details
- Born: Alcibio Mesquita Nunes; 9 January 1957 (age 69) Cruz Alta, Rio Grande do Sul, Brazil
- Party: PL (2021–present)
- Other political affiliations: PSD (2013–2015); PSDB (2015–2016); PMDB (2016–2017); Patriota (2017–2018); PSL (2018–2021)
- Profession: Journalist, TV presenter
- Website: bibonunes.com.br

Alcibio Mesquita Nunes (born 9 January 1957), commonly known as Bibo Nunes, is a Brazilian journalist, television presenter and politician affiliated to PSL. He was presenter of the television programs Bibo no 20, on Canal 20 and the Bibo Nunes Show, which aired on Ulbra TV, TV Urbana and Canal 20.

== Biography ==
Born in Cruz Alta, in the interior of the state of Rio Grande do Sul, Bibo Nunes is the son of Antonio Carlos Gomes Nunes and Elza Mesquita Nunes.

He began his career as a journalist in 1976 at Rádio Cruz Alta. In 1979, he was a presenter and reporter at RBS TV Cruz Alta and the following year he became a correspondent for the newspaper Zero Hora.

In 1982, Bibo moved to Porto Alegre, where he was part of the television news team Meio-Dia: A Hora Local, on TV Bandeirantes Rio Grande do Sul. In the program, Bibo presented the painting Bibo Nunes and the Successes Pepsi, with music videos, party tips and interviews about the young world. In 1984, Bibo Nunes also debuted as an announcer on Universal FM radio.

== Media ==
In 1991, Bibo Nunes assumed the position of president of Fundação Piratini, manager of public radio and television stations in Rio Grande do Sul, being president of TVE RS and director of FM Cultura, during the government of Alceu Collares. His administration at the head of the Piratini Foundation was controversial and modernizing. At the same time that TVE increased local programming and installed retransmitters across the state, Bibo was accused of using the station for personal advertising. Bibo himself presented the main nighttime attraction, the newscast 7 No Ar, alongside Rejane Noschang, Sérgio Schueller and José Fontela.

In 1994, Bibo Nunes was criticized by the host of the program Camera 2, Clovis Duarte, against whom he competed between the hours of 10 PM to midnight. Clovis, who accused Bibo of plagiarizing the format of his program, also raised concerns about the administration of public funds by the young president of the state broadcaster. Bibo then starred in a unique moment on Gaucho television: he left the stand of his program, live, transferring to the studios of TV Guaíba, which was a few meters from TVE, joining Clóvis's program to defend himself. The two broadcasters broadcast the fight live.

In 1998, Bibo Nunes premiered the program Bibo Show on Canal 20 (now Bah TV). Subsequently, the name of the program was renamed to Bibo Nunes Show and passed through Ulbra TV and TV Urbana.

== Political trajectory ==
He was a candidate for federal deputy for the Social Democratic Party (PSD) in 2014, and the city councilor for Porto Alegre for the Party of the Brazilian Democratic Movement (PMDB, now MDB), in 2016, not being elected at any time. In 2018, Bibo Nunes ran again for the position of federal deputy for the Social Liberal Party (PSL), being elected with 1.57% of the electorate (91,664 votes).

The technical area of the Regional Electoral Court recommended that Bibo Nunes' campaign accounts should be disapproved, as it was found that, when he ran for federal deputy, he received a single donation made by a foreigner, which is illegal under Brazilian electoral law. The donor, called Juan Antonio Bruno Perroni, is a non-naturalized Uruguayan who is a businessman in the tobacco industry and has been convicted in two instances by the Federal Court for falsifying IPI control seals on cigarette packages.

As a federal deputy, he stood out for being one of President Jair Bolsonaro's greatest allies in the Chamber of Deputies and on social networks. He was part of the entourage of PSL parliamentarians who traveled to China to learn about the facial recognition system. Subsequently, Bibo Nunes was the author of a bill that requires that it aims to make technology mandatory in all public spaces. Bibo Nunes' proposal was criticized by the organization Human Rights Watch, which considered it as a form of mass surveillance that opens space for abuse and a technology that raises serious doubts about its reliability and potential for discrimination against minorities.

During the COVID-19 pandemic in Brazil, Bibo Nunes was one of the defenders of the end of social isolation, stating in a debate that "This virus accelerates the death of those who are about to die. All over the world, the elderly are dying, people who are already being sent to their deaths. It does not mean that I am in favor of death, because everyone is going to die. Including you and me. So, accepting death is a natural thing, and there is no reason to do complete isolation that breaks the economy".

== Personal life ==
Bibo Nunes is married and the father of two children: Antônio Carlos and Camila Nunes. He is a supporter of Sport Club Internacional. He received the title of honorary citizen of Porto Alegre in 2004. He is Roman Catholic.

== Controversy ==
=== False news involving the Supreme Court ===
On 15 January 2021, with the worsening of the COVID-19 pandemic in Manaus, José Luiz Datena granted space on his television program to President Jair Bolsonaro. The president repeated several times that the STF prevented him from fighting the COVID-19 pandemic. Due to the repercussions of the statements, the STF itself denied the president in a note. According to the Aos Fatos survey, the false news of Bolsonaro reproduced in the program was later disseminated on social networks by two deputies to try to take the blame from President Jair Bolsonaro for the situation in Manaus and transfer it to the STF. They are: Bibo Nunes (PSL-RS) and Marco Feliciano (Republicanos-SP).
