= Ronaldo Fonseca =

Brazilian politician and lawyer

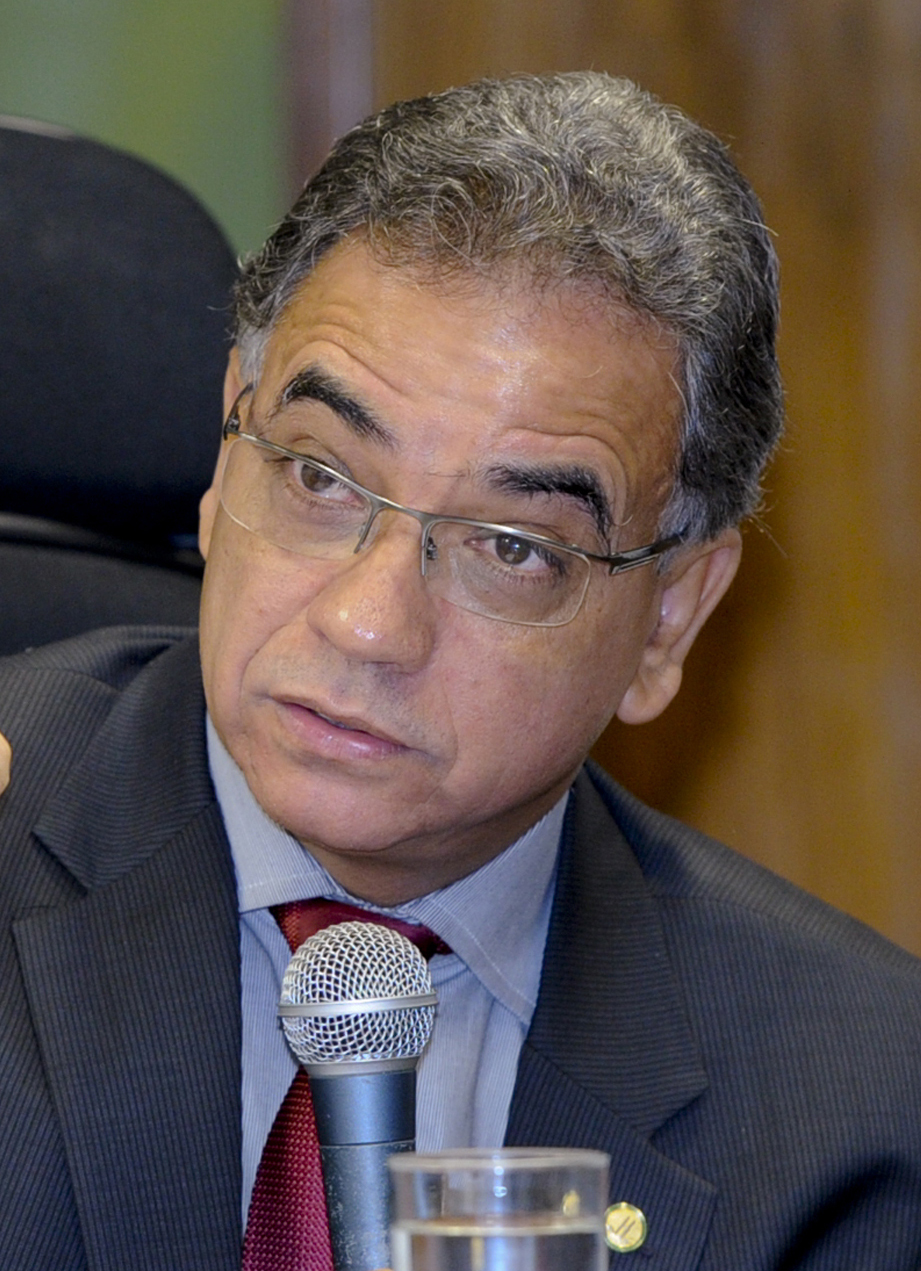
- Fonseca in 2012

Secretary-General of the Presidency
- In office 28 May 2018 – 31 December 2018
- President: Michel Temer
- Preceded by: Moreira Franco
- Succeeded by: Gustavo Bebianno

Federal Deputy
- In office 1 February 2011 – 1 February 2019
- Constituency: Federal District

Personal details
- Born: Ronaldo Fonseca de Souza; 4 April 1959 (age 67) Volta Redonda, Rio de Janeiro, Brazil
- Party: Republicanos (2022–present)
- Other political affiliations: PP (2003–2004); PSC (2004–2006); PR (2009–2013); PROS (2013–2018); PODE (2018–2022)
- Education: Euro American University Center (BA)
- Profession: Lawyer

Ronaldo Fonseca de Souza (born 4 April 1959 in Volta Redonda) is a Brazilian lawyer and politician, member of the Republicans (REP). He was elected Federal Deputy from Distrito Federal in 2010, and was appointed by president Michel Temer as Secretary-General of the Presidency of Brazil. Fonseca is also a pastor of the Assembleias de Deus church.

== Political career ==
In December 2013, deputy Ronaldo Fonseca defended the reduction of taxes in Brazil. Ronaldo is author of a proposal of amendment of the Constitution which extend tax immunity of churches, political parties, and other institutions.

In 2015, Ronaldo supported the reduction of criminal majority, along with resocialization.

In 2016, was reporter, in the Chamber of Deputies' Ethics Council, of an appeal of deputy Eduardo Cunha, denounced in the Operation Car Wash and who had a voting favorable for his removal from the Chamber. Considered Cunha's ally, Fonseca presented a 69-page report asking for a new voting.

In August 2017, voted for the rejection of the denounce of passive corruption against president Temer, whose approval rating was the worst since the military dictatorship. On 28 May 2018, took office as new Secretary-General of the Presidency of the government Michel Temer.

Political offices
Preceded by Moreira Franco	Secretary-General of the Presidency; 2018–2019	Succeeded by Gustavo Bebianno
