= Daniel Coelho =

Brazilian politician (born 1978)

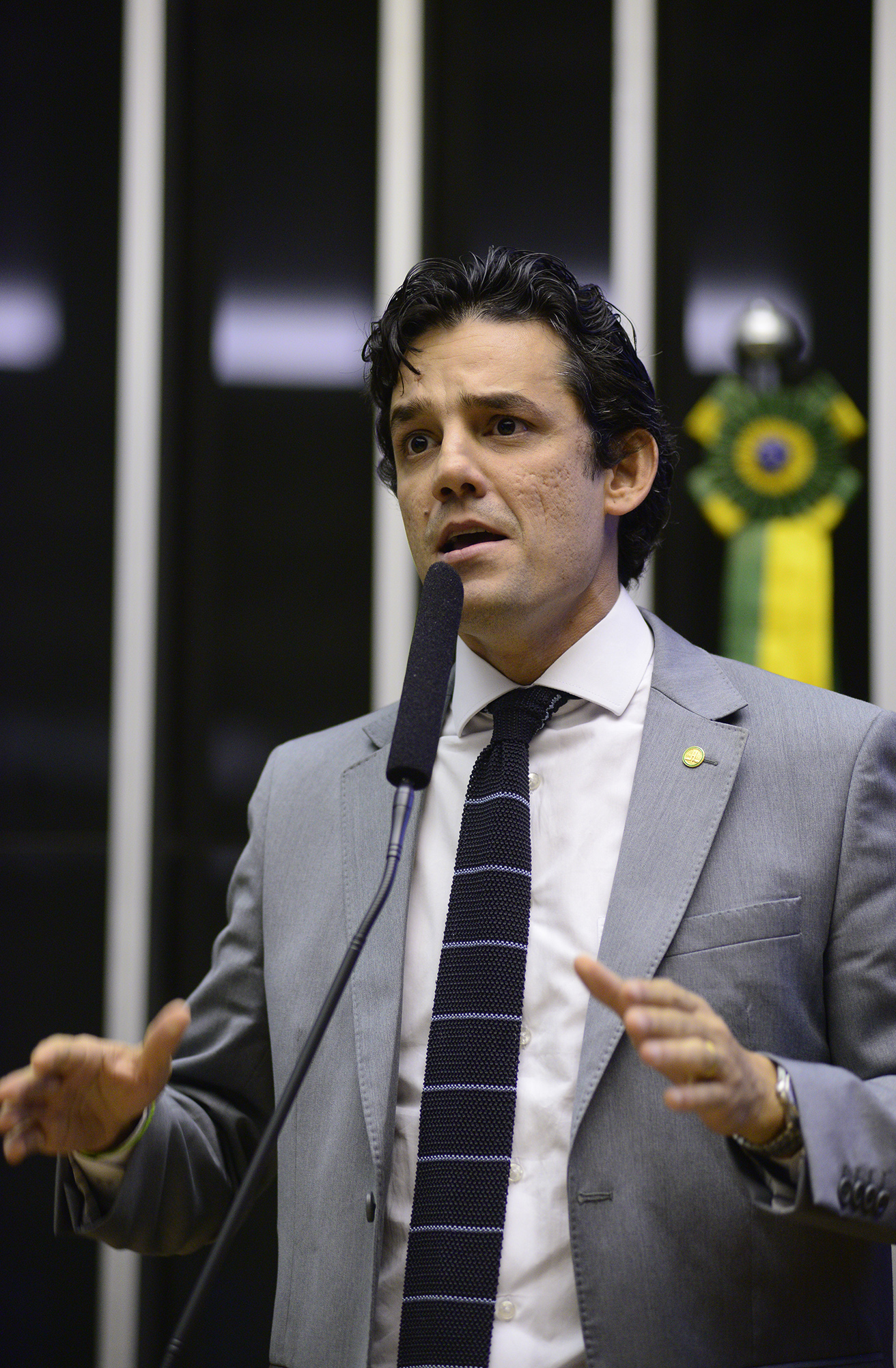
- Coelho in 2015

Member of the Chamber of Deputies
- In office 1 February 2015 – 31 January 2023
- Constituency: Pernambuco

Personal details
- Born: 4 November 1978 (age 47)
- Party: Social Democratic Party (since 2024)

Daniel Pires Coelho (born 4 November 1978) is a Brazilian politician serving as secretary of environment of Pernambuco since 2025. From 2023 to 2024, he served as secretary of tourism of Pernambuco. From 2015 to 2023, he was a member of the Chamber of Deputies. From 2011 to 2014, he was a member of the Legislative Assembly of Pernambuco. From 2005 to 2011, he was a municipal councillor of Recife. In the 2024 mayoral election, he was a candidate for mayor of Recife.
