= Thiago dos Reis =

Brazilian politician (born 1988)

Member of the Chamber of Deputies
- Incumbent
- Assumed office 1 February 2027
- Constituency: São Paulo

Personal details
- Born: 20 January 1988 (age 38)
- Party: Workers' Party

YouTube information
- Channel: Plantão Brasil (Thiago dos Reis)
- Years active: 2017–present
- Genre: Politics
- Subscribers: 2.0 million
- Views: 2.0 billion
- Last updated: 7 October 2025

Thiago dos Reis Pereira dos Santos (born 20 January 1988) is a Brazilian politician and internet personality who was elected member of the Chamber of Deputies in 2026. As of 2024, he had 1.5 million subscribers and 1 billion total video views on YouTube.
