= Leandro Narloch =

Brazilian journalist and writer

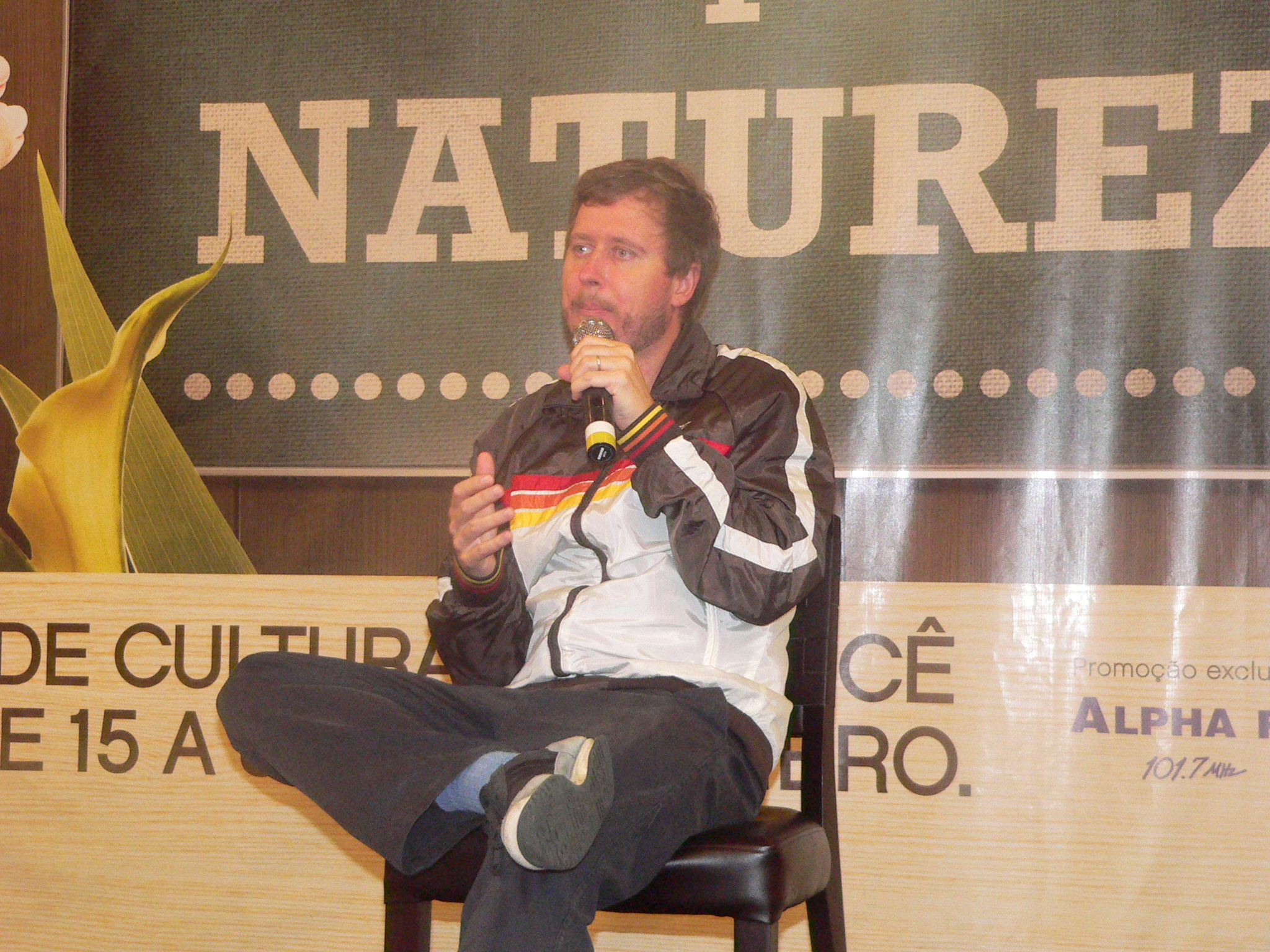
- Leandro Narloch in 2011
- Born: 1978 (age 47–48); Curitiba, Brazil
- Education: Federal University of Paraná
- Occupations: Journalist, writer
- Writing career
- Language: Portuguese
- Period: 2009–present
- Genre: Non-fiction
- Subjects: History, geopolitics, economy

Leandro Narloch (born 1978) is a Brazilian journalist and writer. He worked as a reporter and columnist at the Veja magazine and as an editor at Aventuras na História and Superinteressante magazines, all published by Grupo Abril.

== Biography ==
Narloch was born in Curitiba and studied journalism at the Federal University of Paraná. He also obtained a master's degree in philosophy from Birkbeck, University of London.

In 2002, he moved to São Paulo, where he became a reporter on municipal affairs at the Jornal da Tarde. He then wrote articles for the daily Folha de São Paulo and covered science and history for the Veja magazine from 2006 to 2009, before deciding to pursue a writer's career at the end of 2009.

He became notorious in 2009, when he published his controversial debut book Guia Politicamente Incorreto da História do Brasil (Politically Incorrect Guide to the History of Brazil), a work in which he professed to tear down supposed misconceptions built around important people and events of Brazilian history. The book became a best-seller in Brazil.

In 2011, Narloch released the sequel for his first book, Guia Politicamente Incorreto da América Latina (Politically Incorrect Guide to Latin America), in which Leandro adopts the same line of work, only this time focusing in the History of Latin America in general. In August 2013, he released the third book of the series, Guia Politicamente Incorreto da História do Mundo, which covers world history.

Between 2016 and 2018, Narloch worked again for the Veja magazine as a columnist. He then wrote for the newly founded journal Crusoé before returning to Veja.

In 2017, he served as a member of a special committee discussing the bill proposal to prioritise individual family values in Brazilian school education, introduced by the far right National Ecological Party's MP Erivelton Santana on behalf of the free speech movement Escola sem Partido.

In 2020, Narloch was dismissed from CNN Brasil for his perceived homophobic comments. He subsequently received praise from President Jair Bolsonaro for his "independence" and for speaking his own mind, and was hired by the pro-Bolsonaro media conglomerate Jovem Pan. In 2026, he was interviewed on climate change by the Polish liberal conservative daily Dziennik Gazeta Prawna.

== Views ==
In a 2012 interview with the Mises Institute, Narloch described himself as a "defender and admirer" of the Austrian school of economics and as one of the Institute's "offspring".

In 2016, Narloch wrote in support for the ultraliberal movement Escola sem Partido, linked to far right politicians. He named the liberal conservative philosopher Luiz Felipe Pondé and the right-libertarian economist Joel Pinheiro da Fonseca as "intellectuals whom [he] admired".

Narloch has been listed among the "neoliberal, conservative or reactionary militants" whose books achieved bestseller status in Brazil following the June 2013 protests. He is considered a historical revisionist. The Rio de Janeiro State University political scientist Raphael Fagundes criticised Narloch's self-described "politically incorrect view of history, science, and economics" as "simply an incorrect view of these three spheres" that was politically rather than scientifically motivated and had helped legitimise the ascent of right-wing populist leaders like Donald Trump and Jair Bolsonaro. Similarly, The Intercept's João Filho described Narloch as "a liberal with an extensive record of rendering services to the far right", arguing that while Narloch claimed to oppose Jair Bolsonaro, his work was fuelling Bolsonarism.
