= Chicão Bulhões =

Brazilian politician (born 1988)

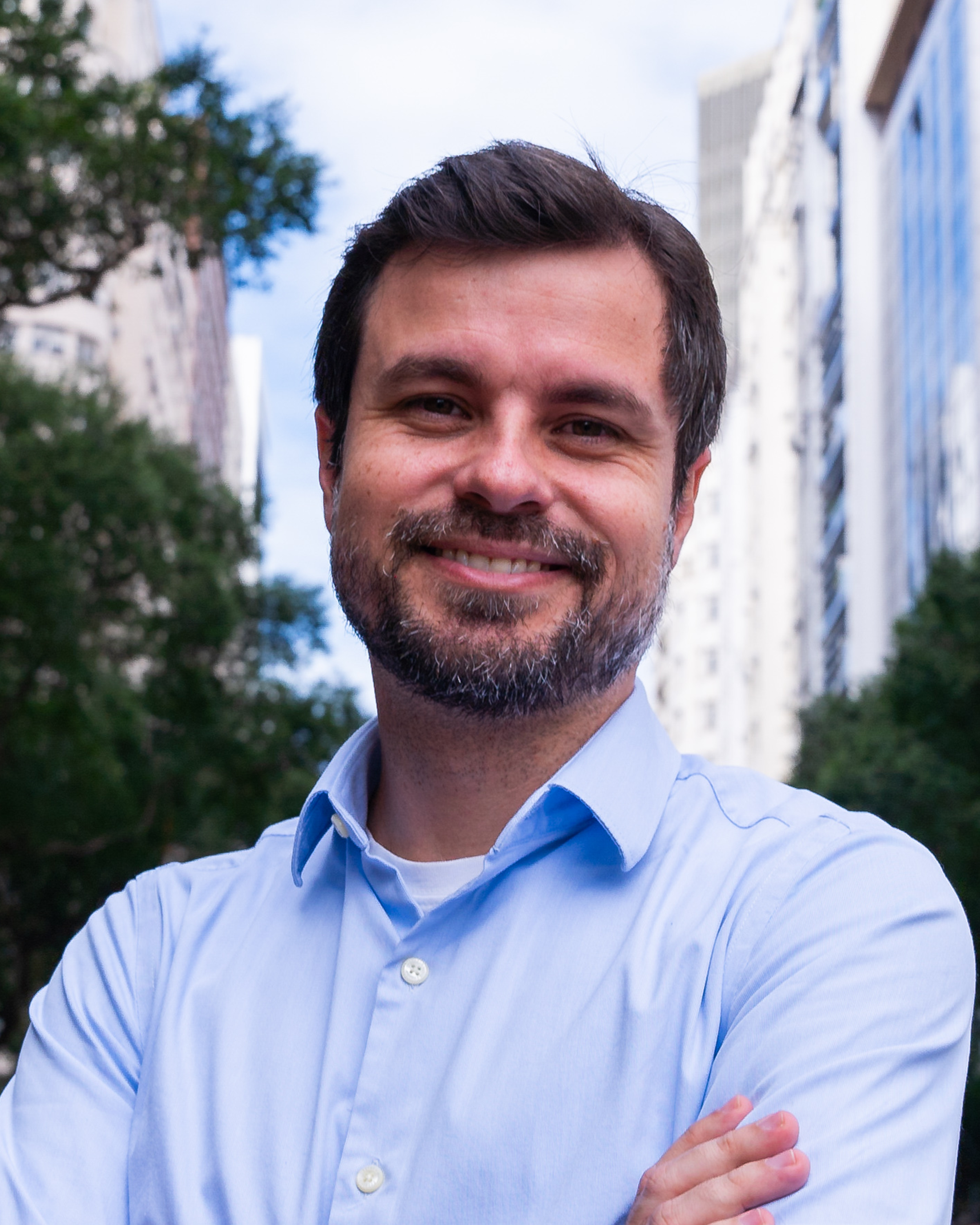
- Bulhões in 2023

Secretary of Economic Development of Rio de Janeiro
- In office 1 January 2021 – 4 November 2024

Personal details
- Born: 18 April 1988 (age 38)
- Party: Social Democratic Party (since 2021)

Francisco Siemsen Bulhões Carvalho da Fonseca (born 18 April 1988), better known as Chicão Bulhões, is a Brazilian politician. From 2021 to 2024, he served as secretary of economic development of Rio de Janeiro. From 2019 to 2020, he was a member of the Legislative Assembly of Rio de Janeiro.
