= Social Liberal Party (Brazil) =

Brazilian political party

Social Liberal Party Partido Social Liberal
- Abbreviation: PSL
- President: Luciano Bivar
- Founded: 30 October 1994; 32 years ago
- Dissolved: 8 February 2022; 4 years ago
- Merged into: Brazil Union
- Headquarters: SHN, Quadra 02, Bloco F, Ed. Executive Office Tower, Sala 1.122 – Brasília, DF
- Membership (October 2021): 74,824
- Ideology: 2018–2022: Bolsonarism; Brazilian nationalism; Conservatism (Brazilian); Economic liberalism; Federalism; Social conservatism; Right-wing populism; Anti-communism; 1994–2018: Social liberalism; Classical liberalism; Cultural liberalism; Liberalism
- Political position: 2018–2022: Right-wing to far-right; 1994–2018: Centre
- Colours: Blue; Yellow; Green
- TSE Identification Number: 17

Website
- psl.org.br

Second-to-last logo of the PSL.

The Social Liberal Party (Portuguese: Partido Social Liberal, PSL) was a political party in Brazil, that merged with the Democrats and founded the Brazil Union. Initially a centrist political party, the PSL became a right-wing to far-right party in 2018.

Founded in 1994 as a social-liberal political party by Luciano Bivar, businessman and former president of football club Sport Club do Recife, the PSL was registered on the Superior Electoral Court in 1998. Throughout much of its early history, the PSL didn't have much of any representation in national politics and mostly remained as the personal party of Bivar. During the 2006 Brazilian general election, Bivar was launched as a presidential candidate and received only 0.06% of the votes. In 2015, the PSL started a modernization and reformation process, harboring the economic liberal and social liberal movement Livres, to emphasize the party's affiliation with social liberalism.

However, in January 2018, former Social Christian Party politician Jair Bolsonaro joined the party in preparation for his presidential campaign and converted it into a far-right party, defending economically liberal, Brazilian nationalist, radically anti-communist and social conservative. The original name remained after the ideological shift, and after Livres (the party's original main wing) left the party and formed their own political movement to continue the party's original goals. Bolsonaro became the party's nominee for the 2018 Brazilian general election and won in both rounds. Many Bolsonarist supporters joined PSL and the party was able to elect 52 federal deputies and 4 federal senators, as well as state governors of Rondônia, Roraima and Santa Catarina, and multiple state deputies in multiple state assemblies. Bolsonaro left the party in 2019 after disagreements with its president, Luciano Bivar, and then founded Alliance for Brazil, later joining the Liberal Party in 2021.

On 6 October 2021, the party voted to merge with the Democrats to establish the Brazil Union party.

== History ==
PSL's logo from 1994 to 2004

PSL was originally founded on 30 October 1994 by businessman Luciano Bivar as a social liberal party. It was registered on the Superior Electoral Court on 2 June 1998.

In the 2002 legislative elections, PSL won 1 out of 513 seats in the Chamber of Deputies and no seats in the Federal Senate. In the 2006 legislative elections, the party won no seats in the Chamber of Deputies or the Federal Senate. In the 2010 legislative elections, PSL won 1 seat in the Chamber of Deputies and no seats in the Federal Senate, maintaining the same results in the 2014 legislative elections.

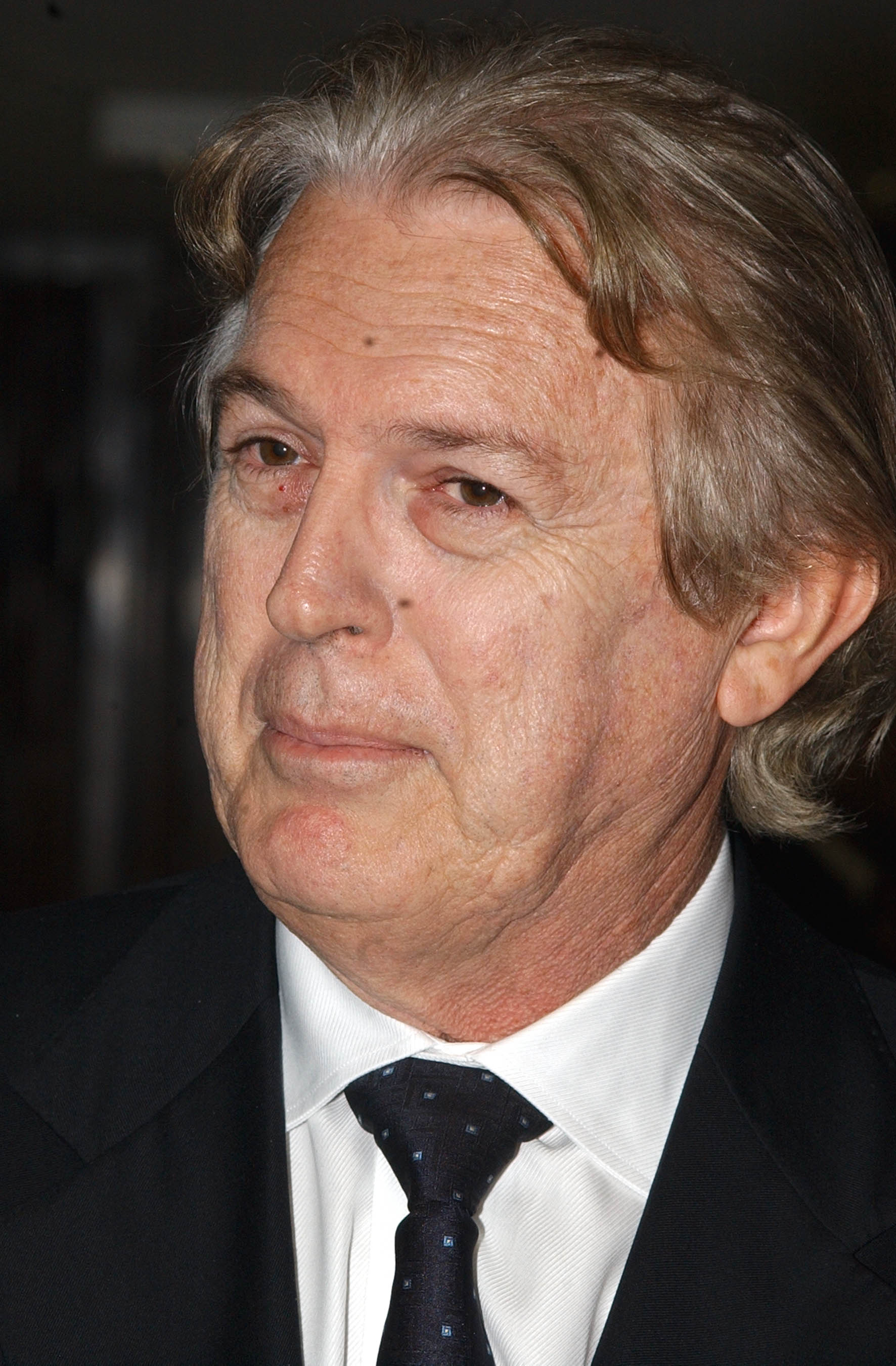
Luciano Bivar during the 2006 Brazilian general election

In 2015, through the initiative of Bivar's son, Sérgio Bivar, the PSL underwent a reform led by the internal social liberal wing Livres, with names such as political scientist Fábio Ostermann and journalist Leandro Narloch reinforcing the party's affiliation with social liberal policies. PSL also supported the impeachment of former president Dilma Rousseff.

In 2017, the only elected federal deputy of the party, Alfredo Kaefer, was expelled from the party after pressure from Livres for voting in favor of a legislation that would negatively affect Ridesharing apps like Uber and Cabify by classifying them as public transportation. Before the vote, Livres had taken a firm stance against the legislation, arguing that regulation would negatively restrict the market. Kaefer, who identified himself as "economically liberal but socially conservative", claimed the group was "hijacking" the party and confusing "liberty with libertinism."

On 5 January 2018, conservative and former Social Christian politician Jair Bolsonaro became a member of the party, which prompted the Livres wing to leave the party in protest of Bolsonaro's social conservative views. After the exit of Livres, the party followed a national conservative path, changed its colors from purple to the more nationalist blue, yellow and green (the colors of Brazil's flag) and since then has discussed a name change either to Republicans (Republicanos) or Mobilize (Mobiliza). On 5 March 2018, Bivar stepped down from party's presidency and Gustavo Bebianno was appointed as acting president.

Bolsonaro eventually became PSL's nominee for the 2018 presidential election, exceeding polling forecasts to receive 46% of the popular vote in the first round. Bolsonaro's coattails helped elect 52 deputies and 4 senators from PSL, which made it the second largest political party in the post-2018 Chamber of Deputies. It also became the largest single party in the legislative assemblies of both Rio de Janeiro and São Paulo. On 28 October 2018, Bolsonaro was elected president with 55.13% of the votes, defeating Workers' Party's Fernando Haddad. He took office on 1 January 2019.

On 29 October 2018, Bivar was re-appointed as party's president. On 12 November 2019, Bolsonaro announced his departure from the party following disagreements with the national executive. However, a lot of Bolsonaro supporters stayed on PSL and the party tried to court members of the Free Brazil Movement.

On 6 October 2021, the party voted to merge with the Democrats (DEM) to establish the Brazil Union party. The new party plans to use the number 44 as its electoral number. The merger was approved by the Superior Electoral Court and officially became registered on 8 February 2022. As such, both PSL and DEM were disbanded.

== Organization ==
PSL while housing the Livres movement

=== Ideology and policies ===
Since Bolsonaro's entrance in the party, PSL has changed much of its ideologies. It went from a social-liberal party with an economic liberal group Livres to a far-right and right-wing populist party, abandoning its former cultural liberalism and keeping its economic liberal policies, supporting privatisation and decentralisation, while at the same time adopting cultural conservatism as well as social-conservative policies regarding abortion, legalization of marijuana, and teaching of gender identity in schools.

== Electoral history ==
=== Presidential elections ===
Election	Party candidate	Running mate	Colligation	Votes	%	Votes	%	Result	Sources
Election	Party candidate	Running mate	Colligation	First round		Second round		Result	Sources
2006	Luciano Bivar (PSL)	Américo de Souza (PSL)	None	62.064	0.06% (#7)	-	-	Lost ✗	
2014	Marina Silva (PSB)	Beto Albuquerque (PSB)	PSB; PHS; PRP; PPS; PPL; PSL	22,176,619	21.32% (#3)	-	-	Lost ✗	
2018	Jair Bolsonaro (PSL)	Hamilton Mourão (PRTB)	PSL; PRTB	49,276,990	46.0% (No. 1)	57,797,801	55.13% (No. 1)	Elected ✓	

=== Legislative elections ===
Election	Chamber of Deputies				Federal Senate				Government
Election	Votes	%	Seats	+/–	Votes	%	Seats	+/–	Government
2002	408,512	0.47%	1 / 513	▲1	295,807	0.19%	0 / 81	0	Opposition
2006	190,793	0.20%	0 / 513	▼1	46,542	0.06%	0 / 81	0	Extra-parliamentary
2010	499,963	0.52%	1 / 513	▲1	446,517	0.26%	0 / 81	0	Opposition
2014	808,710	0.83%	1 / 513	0	did not participate		0 / 81	0	Opposition
2018	11,457,878	11.65%	52 / 513	▲51	19,413,869	11.33%	4 / 81	▲4	Coalition

== See also ==
- Patriota

Preceded by 16 - USWP (PSTU)	Numbers of Brazilian Official Political Parties; 17 - SLP (PSL)(defunct)	Succeeded by 18 - NETWORK (REDE)
