= Opinion polling for the 2018 Brazilian presidential election =

Since the previous elections, various polling companies have published surveys tracking voting intention for the 2018 Brazilian general election. The results of these surveys are listed below in reverse chronological order and include parties whose candidates frequently poll above 3% of the vote as well as the incumbent President of Brazil Michel Temer.

== Presidential election ==
=== First round ===
==== Graphical summary ====
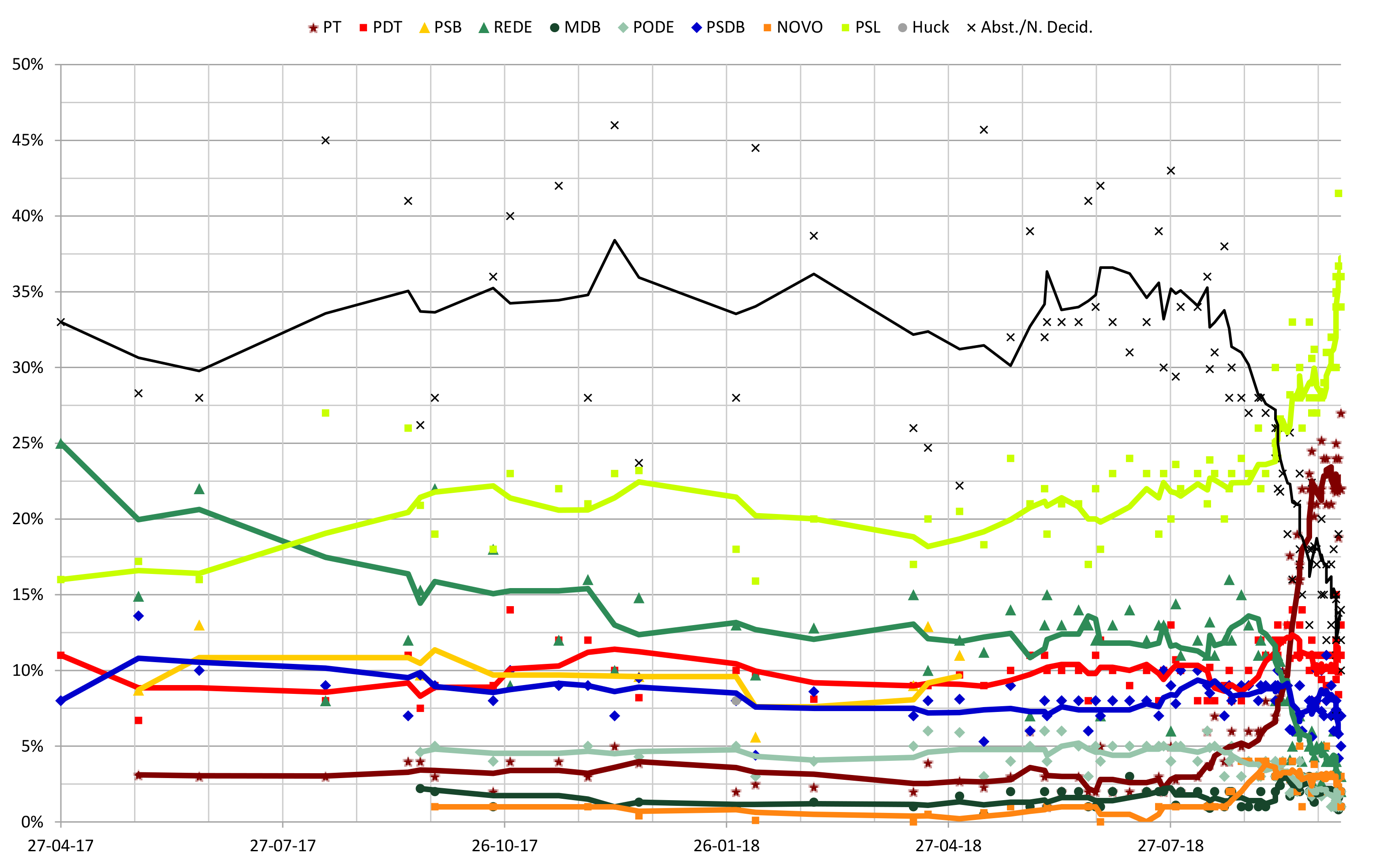
Graph showing 5 poll average trend lines of Brazilian opinion polls from June 2015 to the most recent one. Each line corresponds to a political party. The markers for PT on 18–21 December 2017 and 29–30 January 2018 correspond to the potential candidate Jaques Wagner instead of Fernando Haddad. The markers for MDB on 28 February–3 March 2018 and 27 April–2 May 2018 correspond to the potential candidate Michel Temer instead of Henrique Meirelles. The marker for PSDB on 25–29 May 2017 corresponds to the potential candidate João Doria instead of Geraldo Alckmin.

==== 2018 ====
===== July–Oct =====
Polling firm/link	Date(s) administered	Sample size	Haddad PT	Gomes PDT	Silva REDE	Meirelles MDB	Dias PODE	Alckmin PSDB	Amoêdo NOVO	Bolsonaro PSL	Not affiliated	Others	Abst. Undec.
7 October	Results of the first round	–	29.3%	12.5%	1.0%	1.2%	0.8%	4.8%	2.5%	46.0%	–	1.9%	1.9%
Instituto Veritá	2–5 October 2018	5,208	18.8%	8.4%	1.4%	0.8%	1.0%	4.2%	2.9%	41.5%	_	2.0%	19.0%
CNT/MDA	4–5 October 2018	2,002	24.0%	9.9%	2.2%	1.6%	1.7%	5.8%	2.3%	36.7%	_	1.9%	13.8%
DataPoder360	3–4 October 2018	4,000	25%	15%	2%	3%	4%	7%	2%	30%	5%	7%	
Datafolha	3–4 October 2018	19,552	22%	13%	3%	2%	2%	7%	3%	36%	_	2%	10%
XP/Ipespe	3–4 October 2018	2,000	22%	11%	4%	2%	2%	7%	3%	36%	–	1%	12%
Datafolha	3–4 October 2018	10,930	22%	11%	4%	2%	2%	8%	3%	35%	–	2%	11%
RealTime Big Data	3–4 October 2018	10,000	24%	12%	4%	1%	1%	6%	2%	34%	–	1%	15%
Paraná Pesquisas/Crusoé	2–4 October 2018	2,080	21.8%	9.4%	3.5%	1.7%	1.4%	7.4%	3.1%	34.9%	–	2.1%	14.7%
Ibope	1–2 October 2018	3,010	22%	11%	3%	2%	1%	7%	2%	36%	–	4%	12%
Ibope	1–2 October 2018	3,010	23%	10%	4%	2%	1%	7%	2%	32%	–	2%	17%
Datafolha	29–30 September 2018	3,240	21%	11%	4%	2%	2%	9%	3%	32%	–	2%	13%
Ibope	29–30 September 2018	3,010	21%	11%	4%	2%	2%	8%	3%	31%	–	1%	17%
FSB Pesquisa	29–30 September 2018	2,000	24%	9%	4%	2%	2%	11%	5%	31%	–	1%	12%
CNT/MDA	27–28 September 2018	2,000	25.2%	9.4%	2.6%	2.0%	1.7%	7.3%	2.0%	28.2%		1.6%	20.0%
Datafolha	26–28 September 2018	9,000	22%	11%	5%	2%	2%	10%	3%	28%	–	3%	15%
XP/Ipespe	24–26 September 2018	2,000	21%	11%	5%	2%	2%	8%	3%	28%	–	3%	17%
Paraná Pesquisas/Crusoé	23–25 September 2018	2,020	20.2%	10.1%	4.3%	1.3%	1.9%	7.6%	3.8%	31.2%	–	1.4%	18.2%
Ibope	22–24 September 2018	2,000	21%	12%	6%	2%	2%	8%	3%	27%	–	1%	18%
IstoÉ/Sensus	21–24 September 2018	2,000	24.5%	7.7%	2.7%	1.6%	1.7%	5.6%	1.9%	30.6%	–	1.3%	22.4%
FSB Pesquisa	22–23 September 2018	2,000	23%	10%	5%	3%	2%	8%	3%	33%	–	1%	13%
Ibope	22–23 September 2018	2,506	22%	11%	5%	2%	2%	8%	3%	28%	–	1%	18%
DataPoder360	19–20 September 2018	4,000	22%	14%	4%	3%	3%	6%	1%	26%	–	5%	15%
Datafolha	18–19 September 2018	8,601	16%	13%	7%	2%	3%	9%	3%	28%	–	2%	17%
Genial Investimentos/Brasilis	17–19 September 2018	1,000	17%	7%	6%	3%	4%	7%	5%	30%	–	4%	18%
XP/Ipespe	17–19 September 2018	2,000	16%	11%	6%	2%	3%	7%	3%	28%	–	1%	23%
Ibope	16–18 September 2018	2,506	19%	11%	6%	2%	2%	7%	2%	28%	–	1%	21%
FSB Pesquisa	15–16 September 2018	2,000	16%	14%	5%	2%	2%	6%	4%	33%	–	2%	16%
CNT/MDA	12–15 September 2018	2,002	17.6%	10.8%	4.1%	1.7%	1.9%	6.1%	2.8%	28.2%	–	1.1%	25.7%
Datafolha	13–14 September 2018	2,820	13%	13%	8%	3%	3%	9%	3%	26%	–	3%	19%
XP/Ipespe	10–12 September 2018	2,000	10%	12%	8%	2%	4%	9%	4%	26%	–	2%	23%
Paraná Pesquisas/Crusoé	7–11 September 2018	2,010	8.3%	11.9%	10.6%	2.4%	3.7%	8.7%	3.3%	26.6%	–	2.7%	21.8%
Datafolha	10 September 2018	2,804	9%	13%	11%	3%	3%	10%	3%	24%	–	3%	22%
Ibope	8–10 September 2018	2,002	8%	11%	9%	3%	3%	9%	3%	26%	–	2%	26%
FSB Pesquisa	8–9 September 2018	2,000	8%	12%	8%	3%	3%	8%	3%	30%	–	2%	24%
RealTime Big Data	7–9 September 2018	3,200	7%	11%	11%	2%	4%	9%	3%	25%	–	2%	26%
On 6 September 2018, Jair Bolsonaro was stabbed while he was campaigning in Juiz de Fora, Minas Gerais.
XP/Ipespe	3–5 September 2018	2,000	8%	11%	11%	1%	4%	9%	4%	23%		2%	27%
Ibope	1–3 September 2018	2,002	6%	12%	12%	2%	3%	9%	3%	22%	–	3%	28%
FSB Pesquisa	1–2 September 2018	2,000	6%	12%	11%	1%	3%	8%	4%	26%	–	2%	28%

===== Apr–Aug =====
Polling firm/link	Date(s) administered	Sample size	PT	PDT	PSB	REDE	MDB	PODE	PSDB	NOVO	PSL	Not affiliated	Others	Abst. Undec.
On 31 August 2018, the Superior Electoral Court votes to officially reject Luiz Inácio Lula da Silva's candidacy.
XP/Ipespe	27–29 August 2018	1,000	6% (Haddad)	10% (Gomes)	–	13% (Silva)	1% (Meirelles)	4% (Dias)	9% (Alckmin)	4% (Amoedo)	23% (Bolsonaro)	–	6%	27%
XP/Ipespe	27–29 August 2018	1,000	13% (Haddad, supported by Lula)	10% (Gomes)	–	10% (Silva)	1% (Meirelles)	4% (Dias)	8% (Alckmin)	4% (Amoedo)	21% (Bolsonaro)	–	6%	28%
XP/Ipespe	27–29 August 2018	1,000	33% (Lula) cannot run in election	8% (Gomes)	–	7% (Silva)	1% (Meirelles)	3% (Dias)	7% (Alckmin)	4% (Amoedo)	21% (Bolsonaro)	–	5%	15%
DataPoder360	24–27 August 2018	5,500	30% (Lula) cannot run in election	7% (Gomes)		6% (Silva)	2% (Meirelles)	3% (Dias)	7% (Alckmin)	1% (Amoedo)	21% (Bolsonaro)	–	7%	18%
FSB Pesquisa	25–26 August 2018	2,000	5% (Haddad)	8% (Gomes)	–	15% (Silva)	1% (Meirelles)	3% (Dias)	9% (Alckmin)	4% (Amoedo)	24% (Bolsonaro)	–	4%	28%
FSB Pesquisa	25–26 August 2018	2,000	35% (Lula) cannot run in election	5% (Gomes)	–	9% (Silva)	1% (Meirelles)	2% (Dias)	6% (Alckmin)	4% (Amoedo)	22% (Bolsonaro)	–	2%	15%
XP/Ipespe	20–22 August 2018	1,000	6% (Haddad)	8% (Gomes)	–	12% (Silva)	2% (Meirelles)	5% (Dias)	8% (Alckmin)	2% (Amoedo)	23% (Bolsonaro)	–	5%	30%
XP/Ipespe	20–22 August 2018	1,000	13% (Haddad, supported by Lula)	8% (Gomes)	–	9% (Silva)	1% (Meirelles)	5% (Dias)	8% (Alckmin)	1% (Amoedo)	20% (Bolsonaro)	–	4%	31%
XP/Ipespe	20–22 August 2018	1,000	32% (Lula) cannot run in election	7% (Gomes)	–	7% (Silva)	1% (Meirelles)	4% (Dias)	7% (Alckmin)	2% (Amoedo)	20% (Bolsonaro)	–	3%	18%
Datafolha	20–21 August 2018	8,433	4% (Haddad)	10% (Gomes)	–	16% (Silva)	2% (Meirelles)	4% (Dias)	9% (Alckmin)	2% (Amoedo)	22% (Bolsonaro)	–	4%	28%
Datafolha	20–21 August 2018	8,433	39% (Lula) cannot run in election	5% (Gomes)	–	8% (Silva)	1% (Meirelles)	3% (Dias)	6% (Alckmin)	2% (Amoedo)	19% (Bolsonaro)	–	3%	14%
Ibope	17–19 August 2018	2,002	4% (Haddad)	9% (Gomes)	–	12% (Silva)	1% (Meirelles)	3% (Dias)	7% (Alckmin)	1% (Amoedo)	20% (Bolsonaro)	–	6%	38%
Ibope	17–19 August 2018	2,002	37% (Lula) cannot run in election	5% (Gomes)	–	6% (Silva)	1% (Meirelles)	3% (Dias)	5% (Alckmin)	1% (Amoedo)	18% (Bolsonaro)	–	3%	22%
CNT/MDA	15–18 August 2018	2,002	37.7% (Lula) cannot run in election	4.1% (Gomes)	–	5.6% (Silva)	0.8% (Meirelles)	2.7% (Dias)	4.9% (Alckmin)		18.8% (Bolsonaro)	–	2.2%	23.1%
Ipespe	13–15 August 2018	1,000	7% (Haddad)	8% (Gomes)	–	11% (Silva)	2% (Meirelles)	5% (Dias)	9% (Alckmin)		23% (Bolsonaro)	–	4%	31%
Ipespe	13–15 August 2018	1,000	15% (Haddad, supported by Lula)	7% (Gomes)	–	9% (Silva)	2% (Meirelles)	6% (Dias)	9% (Alckmin)		21% (Bolsonaro)	–	4%	28%
Ipespe	13–15 August 2018	1,000	31% (Lula) cannot run in election	7% (Gomes)	–	8% (Silva)	1% (Meirelles)	5% (Dias)	9% (Alckmin)		20% (Bolsonaro)	–	3%	16%
Paraná Pesquisas	9–13 August 2018	2,002	3.8% (Haddad)	10.2% (Gomes)	–	13.2% (Silva)	0.9% (Meirelles)	4.9% (Dias)	8.5% (Alckmin)		23.9% (Bolsonaro)	–	4.9%	29.9%
Paraná Pesquisas	9–13 August 2018	2,002	30.8% (Lula) cannot run in election	5.9% (Gomes)	–	8.1% (Silva)	0.7% (Meirelles)	4.0% (Dias)	6.6% (Alckmin)		22.0% (Bolsonaro)	–	3.2%	18.9%
Ipespe	6–8 August 2018	1,000	3% (Haddad)	8% (Gomes)	–	12% (Silva)	2% (Meirelles)	4% (Dias)	10% (Alckmin)		23% (Bolsonaro)	–	3%	34%
Ipespe	6–8 August 2018	1,000	13% (Haddad, supported by Lula)	7% (Gomes)	–	10% (Silva)	2% (Meirelles)	5% (Dias)	9% (Alckmin)		21% (Bolsonaro)	–	3%	30%
Ipespe	6–8 August 2018	1,000	31% (Lula) cannot run in election	6% (Gomes)	–	8% (Silva)	2% (Meirelles)	5% (Dias)	9% (Alckmin)		19% (Bolsonaro)	–	3%	17%
Ipespe	6–8 August 2018	1,000	–	9% (Gomes)	–	12% (Silva)	3% (Meirelles)	5% (Dias)	10% (Alckmin)		23% (Bolsonaro)	–	4%	34%
Ipespe	30 July–1 August 2018	1,000	2% (Haddad)	10% (Gomes)	–	11% (Silva)	2% (Meirelles)	5% (Dias)	10% (Alckmin)		22% (Bolsonaro)	–	3%	34%
Ipespe	30 July–1 August 2018	1,000	13% (Haddad, supported by Lula)	8% (Gomes)	–	9% (Silva)	2% (Meirelles)	4% (Dias)	9% (Alckmin)		20% (Bolsonaro)	–	3%	31%
Ipespe	30 July–1 August 2018	1,000	31% (Lula) cannot run in election	7% (Gomes)	–	8% (Silva)	2% (Meirelles)	4% (Dias)	9% (Alckmin)		19% (Bolsonaro)	–	3%	18%
Ipespe	30 July–1 August 2018	1,000	–	10% (Gomes)	–	11% (Silva)	3% (Meirelles)	5% (Dias)	10% (Alckmin)		22% (Bolsonaro)	–	3%	35%
Paraná Pesquisas	25–30 July 2018	2,240	2.8% (Haddad)	10.7% (Gomes)	–	14.4% (Silva)	1.1% (Meirelles)	5.0% (Dias)	7.8% (Alckmin)		23.6% (Bolsonaro)	–	5.3%	29.4%
Paraná Pesquisas	25–30 July 2018	2,240	29.0% (Lula) cannot run in election	6.0% (Gomes)	–	9.2% (Silva)	0.8% (Meirelles)	4.2% (Dias)	6.2% (Alckmin)		21.8% (Bolsonaro)	–	3.6%	19.2%
Paraná Pesquisas	25–30 July 2018	2,240	2.8% (Wagner)	10.8% (Gomes)	–	14.3% (Silva)	1.2% (Meirelles)	4.9% (Dias)	7.9% (Alckmin)		23.5% (Bolsonaro)	–	5.9%	28.9%
DataPoder360	25–28 July 2018	3,000	5% (Haddad)	13% (Gomes)	–	6% (Silva)	–	4% (Dias)	9% (Alckmin)		20% (Bolsonaro)	–	–	43%
Ipespe	23–25 July 2018	1,000	2% (Haddad)	10% (Gomes)	–	13% (Silva)	2% (Meirelles)	5% (Dias)	10% (Alckmin)		23% (Bolsonaro)	–	2%	30%
Ipespe	23–25 July 2018	1,000	12% (Haddad, supported by Lula)	9% (Gomes)	–	10% (Silva)	1% (Meirelles)	5% (Dias)	9% (Alckmin)		22% (Bolsonaro)	–	3%	29%
Ipespe	23–25 July 2018	1,000	30% (Lula) cannot run in election	8% (Gomes)	–	8% (Silva)	1% (Meirelles)	5% (Dias)	9% (Alckmin)		20% (Bolsonaro)	–	2%	17%
Ipespe	23–25 July 2018	1,000	–	10% (Gomes)	–	12% (Silva)	2% (Meirelles)	5% (Dias)	10% (Alckmin)		23% (Bolsonaro)	–	3%	34%
Ideia Big Data	20–23 July 2018	2,036	3% (Haddad)	8% (Gomes)	–	13% (Silva)	2% (Meirelles)	5% (Dias)	7% (Alckmin)		19% (Bolsonaro)	–	3%	39%
Ideia Big Data	20–23 July 2018	2,036	29% (Lula) cannot run in election	7% (Gomes)	–	10% (Silva)	2% (Meirelles)	4% (Dias)	7% (Alckmin)		17% (Bolsonaro)	–	4%	20%
Ideia Big Data	20–23 July 2018	2,036	3% (Wagner)	8% (Gomes)	–	14% (Silva)	2% (Meirelles)	4% (Dias)	7% (Alckmin)		19% (Bolsonaro)	–	3%	37%
Ideia Big Data	20–23 July 2018	2,036	9% (some candidate supported by Lula)	7% (Gomes)	–	11% (Silva)	2% (Meirelles)	4% (Dias)	6% (Alckmin)		19% (Bolsonaro)	–	5%	37%
Vox Populi	18–20 July 2018	2,000	41% (Lula) cannot run in election	5% (Gomes)	–	4% (Silva)	0% (Meirelles)	1% (Dias)	4% (Alckmin)		12% (Bolsonaro)	–	3%	30%
Vox Populi	18–20 July 2018	2,000	44% (Lula) cannot run in election	4% (Gomes)	–	5% (Silva)	–	–	4% (Alckmin)		14% (Bolsonaro)	–	–	28%
Ipespe	16–18 July 2018	1,000	2% (Haddad)	10% (Gomes)	–	12% (Silva)	2% (Meirelles)	5% (Dias)	8% (Alckmin)		23% (Bolsonaro)	–	3%	33%
Ipespe	16–18 July 2018	1,000	13% (Haddad, supported by Lula)	8% (Gomes)	–	10% (Silva)	2% (Meirelles)	5% (Dias)	7% (Alckmin)		21% (Bolsonaro)	–	3%	31%
Ipespe	16–18 July 2018	1,000	29% (Lula) cannot run in election	7% (Gomes)	–	8% (Silva)	1% (Meirelles)	5% (Dias)	7% (Alckmin)		20% (Bolsonaro)	–	3%	19%
Ipespe	16–18 July 2018	1,000	–	10% (Gomes)	–	12% (Silva)	2% (Meirelles)	5% (Dias)	9% (Alckmin)		23% (Bolsonaro)	–	3%	36%
Ipespe	9–11 July 2018	1,000	2% (Haddad)	9% (Gomes)	–	14% (Silva)	3% (Meirelles)	5% (Dias)	8% (Alckmin)		24% (Bolsonaro)	–	4%	31%
Ipespe	9–11 July 2018	1,000	12% (Haddad, supported by Lula)	8% (Gomes)	–	11% (Silva)	2% (Meirelles)	4% (Dias)	7% (Alckmin)		21% (Bolsonaro)	–	4%	31%
Ipespe	9–11 July 2018	1,000	30% (Lula) cannot run in election	7% (Gomes)	–	10% (Silva)	2% (Meirelles)	5% (Dias)	7% (Alckmin)		20% (Bolsonaro)	–	3%	15%
Ipespe	9–11 July 2018	1,000	–	9% (Gomes)	–	13% (Silva)	2% (Meirelles)	5% (Dias)	8% (Alckmin)		23% (Bolsonaro)	–	5%	35%
Ipespe	2–4 July 2018	1,000	2% (Haddad)	10% (Gomes)	–	13% (Silva)	2% (Meirelles)	5% (Dias)	8% (Alckmin)		23% (Bolsonaro)	–	4%	33%
Ipespe	2–4 July 2018	1,000	11% (Haddad, supported by Lula)	8% (Gomes)	–	11% (Silva)	2% (Meirelles)	5% (Dias)	7% (Alckmin)		21% (Bolsonaro)	–	4%	29%
Ipespe	2–4 July 2018	1,000	28% (Lula) cannot run in election	7% (Gomes)	–	9% (Silva)	1% (Meirelles)	5% (Dias)	7% (Alckmin)		20% (Bolsonaro)	–	3%	19%
Ipespe	2–4 July 2018	1,000	–	10% (Gomes)	–	12% (Silva)	2% (Meirelles)	5% (Dias)	8% (Alckmin)		23% (Bolsonaro)	–	4%	35%
DataPoder360	25–29 June 2018	5,500	5% (Haddad)	12% (Gomes)	–	7% (Silva)	1% (Meirelles)	4% (Dias)	7% (Alckmin)		18% (Bolsonaro)	–	5%	42%
DataPoder360	25–29 June 2018	5,500	6% (Haddad)	13% (Gomes)	–	7% (Silva)	–	5% (Dias)	8% (Alckmin)		21% (Bolsonaro)	–	–	40%
Ipespe	25–27 June 2018	1,000	2% (Haddad)	11% (Gomes)	–	12% (Silva)	1% (Meirelles)	5% (Dias)	8% (Alckmin)		22% (Bolsonaro)	–	4%	34%
Ipespe	25–27 June 2018	1,000	11% (Haddad, supported by Lula)	8% (Gomes)	–	10% (Silva)	2% (Meirelles)	5% (Dias)	7% (Alckmin)		20% (Bolsonaro)	–	4%	33%
Ipespe	25–27 June 2018	1,000	29% (Lula) cannot run in election	6% (Gomes)	–	9% (Silva)	1% (Meirelles)	5% (Dias)	7% (Alckmin)		19% (Bolsonaro)	–	3%	21%
Ipespe	25–27 June 2018	1,000	–	10% (Gomes)	–	12% (Silva)	1% (Meirelles)	5% (Dias)	7% (Alckmin)		22% (Bolsonaro)	–	4%	39%
IBOPE	21–24 June 2018	2,000	2% (Haddad)	8% (Gomes)	–	13% (Silva)	1% (Meirelles)	3% (Dias)	6% (Alckmin)		17% (Bolsonaro)	–	10%	41%
IBOPE	21–24 June 2018	2,000	33% (Lula) cannot run in election	4% (Gomes)	–	7% (Silva)	0% (Meirelles)	2% (Dias)	4% (Alckmin)		15% (Bolsonaro)	–	7%	28%
Ipespe	18–20 June 2018	1,000	3% (Haddad)	10% (Gomes)	–	14% (Silva)	2% (Meirelles)	5% (Dias)	8% (Alckmin)		21% (Bolsonaro)	–	4%	33%
Ipespe	18–20 June 2018	1,000	12% (Haddad, supported by Lula)	8% (Gomes)	–	11% (Silva)	2% (Meirelles)	5% (Dias)	8% (Alckmin)		19% (Bolsonaro)	–	4%	31%
Ipespe	18–20 June 2018	1,000	28% (Lula) cannot run in election	5% (Gomes)	–	10% (Silva)	1% (Meirelles)	4% (Dias)	7% (Alckmin)		19% (Bolsonaro)	–	3%	23%
Ipespe	18–20 June 2018	1,000	–	10% (Gomes)	–	13% (Silva)	1% (Meirelles)	5% (Dias)	8% (Alckmin)		22% (Bolsonaro)	–	4%	36%
Ipespe	11–13 June 2018	1,000	2% (Haddad)	10% (Gomes)	–	13% (Silva)	2% (Meirelles)	6% (Dias)	8% (Alckmin)		22% (Bolsonaro)	–	4%	33%
Ipespe	11–13 June 2018	1,000	11% (Haddad, supported by Lula)	9% (Gomes)	–	10% (Silva)	2% (Meirelles)	6% (Dias)	8% (Alckmin)		20% (Bolsonaro)	–	2%	31%
Ipespe	11–13 June 2018	1,000	29% (Lula) cannot run in election	6% (Gomes)	–	10% (Silva)	2% (Meirelles)	6% (Dias)	7% (Alckmin)		19% (Bolsonaro)	–	2%	18%
Ipespe	11–13 June 2018	1,000	–	11% (Gomes)	–	13% (Silva)	2% (Meirelles)	6% (Dias)	8% (Alckmin)		22% (Bolsonaro)	–	4%	34%
Datafolha	6–7 June 2018	2,824	1% (Haddad)	10% (Gomes)	–	15% (Silva)	1% (Meirelles)	4% (Dias)	7% (Alckmin)		19% (Bolsonaro)	–	10%	33%
Datafolha	6–7 June 2018	2,824	30% (Lula) cannot run in election	6% (Gomes)	–	10% (Silva)	1% (Meirelles)	4% (Dias)	6% (Alckmin)		17% (Bolsonaro)	–	5%	21%
Datafolha	6–7 June 2018	2,824	1% (Wagner)	10% (Gomes)	–	14% (Silva)	1% (Meirelles)	4% (Dias)	7% (Alckmin)		19% (Bolsonaro)	–	10%	33%
Datafolha	6–7 June 2018	2,824	–	11% (Gomes)	–	15% (Silva)	1% (Meirelles)	4% (Dias)	7% (Alckmin)		19% (Bolsonaro)	–	9%	34%
Ipespe	4–6 June 2018	1,000	3% (Haddad)	11% (Gomes)	–	13% (Silva)	2% (Meirelles)	6% (Dias)	8% (Alckmin)		22% (Bolsonaro)	–	3%	32%
Ipespe	4–6 June 2018	1,000	11% (Haddad, supported by Lula)	9% (Gomes)	–	11% (Silva)	2% (Meirelles)	6% (Dias)	8% (Alckmin)		21% (Bolsonaro)	–	4%	27%
Ipespe	4–6 June 2018	1,000	30% (Lula) cannot run in election	6% (Gomes)	–	10% (Silva)	2% (Meirelles)	5% (Dias)	7% (Alckmin)		20% (Bolsonaro)	–	4%	16%
Ipespe	4–6 June 2018	1,000	–	11% (Gomes)	–	13% (Silva)	1% (Meirelles)	7% (Dias)	9% (Alckmin)		23% (Bolsonaro)	–	3%	32%
DataPoder360	25–31 May 2018	10,500	6% (Haddad)	11% (Gomes)	–	7% (Silva)	1% (Meirelles)	5% (Dias)	6% (Alckmin)		21% (Bolsonaro)	–	5.8%	39%
DataPoder360	25–31 May 2018	10,500	8% (Haddad)	12% (Gomes)	–	6% (Silva)	–	6% (Dias)	7% (Alckmin)		25% (Bolsonaro)	–	–	36%
DataPoder360	25–31 May 2018	10,500	8% (Haddad)	12% (Gomes)	–	7% (Silva)	–	6% (Dias)	6% (Doria)		22% (Bolsonaro)	–	–	40%
Vox Populi	19–23 May 2018	2,000	39% (Lula) cannot run in election	4% (Gomes)	–	6% (Silva)	1% (Meirelles)	2% (Dias)	3% (Alckmin)		12% (Bolsonaro)	–	2%	30%
Ipespe	15–18 and 21–23 May 2018	2,000	3% (Haddad)	10% (Gomes)	–	14% (Silva)	2% (Meirelles)	4% (Dias)	9% (Alckmin)		24% (Bolsonaro)	–	2%	32%
Ipespe	15–18 and 21–23 May 2018	2,000	29% (Lula) cannot run in election	6% (Gomes)	–	9% (Silva)	1% (Temer)	4% (Dias)	9% (Alckmin)		24% (Bolsonaro)	–	3%	17%
Ipespe	15–18 and 21–23 May 2018	2,000	–	10% (Gomes)	–	13% (Silva)	1% (Meirelles)	5% (Dias)	9% (Alckmin)		24% (Bolsonaro)	–	3%	36%
MDA	9–12 May 2018	2,002	2.3% (Haddad)	9.0% (Gomes)	–	11.2% (Silva)	0.5% (Meirelles)	3.0% (Dias)	5.3% (Alckmin)		18.3% (Bolsonaro)	–	4.4%	45.7%
MDA	9–12 May 2018	2,002	4.4% (Haddad)	12.0% (Gomes)	–	16.4% (Silva)	1.4% (Meirelles)	–	–		20.7% (Bolsonaro)	–	–	45.1%
MDA	9–12 May 2018	2,002	3.8% (Haddad)	11.1% (Gomes)	–	15.1% (Silva)	–	–	8.1% (Alckmin)		19.7% (Bolsonaro)	–	–	42.2%
MDA	9–12 May 2018	2,002	32.4% (Lula) cannot run in election	5.4% (Gomes)	–	7.6% (Silva)	0.3% (Meirelles)	2.5% (Dias)	4.0% (Alckmin)		16.7% (Bolsonaro)	–	3.0%	26.7%
MDA	9–12 May 2018	2,002	32.4% (Lula) cannot run in election	5.4% (Gomes)	–	7.6% (Silva)	0.9% (Temer)	2.5% (Dias)	4.0% (Alckmin)		16.7% (Bolsonaro)	–	3.0%	26.7%
Paraná Pesquisas	27 April–2 May 2018	2,002	2.7% (Haddad)	9.7% (Gomes)	11.0% (Barbosa)	12.0% (Silva)	1.7% (Temer)	5.9% (Dias)	8.1% (Alckmin)		20.5% (Bolsonaro)	–	6.0%	22.2%
Paraná Pesquisas	27 April–2 May 2018	2,002	27.6% (Lula) cannot run in election	5.5% (Gomes)	9.2% (Barbosa)	7.7% (Silva)	1.1% (Temer)	5.4% (Dias)	6.9% (Alckmin)		19.5% (Bolsonaro)	–	4.2%	12.8%
Paraná Pesquisas	27 April–2 May 2018	2,002	–	10.1% (Gomes)	11.2% (Barbosa)	13.3% (Silva)	1.7% (Temer)	6.1% (Dias)	8.4% (Alckmin)		20.7% (Bolsonaro)	–	6.4%	22.0%
DataPoder360	16–19 April 2018	2,000	3.9% (Haddad)	9.0% (Gomes)	12.9% (Barbosa)	10.0% (Silva)	–	6.0% (Dias)	8.0% (Alckmin)		20.0% (Bolsonaro)	–	5.5%	24.7%
DataPoder360	16–19 April 2018	2,000	7.4% (Haddad)	8.4% (Gomes)	16.3% (Barbosa)	8.2% (Silva)	–	6.3% (Dias)	5.5% (Alckmin)		22.4% (Bolsonaro)	–	–	25;5%
Vox Populi	13–15 April 2018	2,000	47% (Lula) cannot run in election	2% (Gomes)	9% (Barbosa)	7% (Silva)	1% (Meirelles)	2% (Dias)	3% (Alckmin)		11% (Bolsonaro)	–	0%	18%
Vox Populi	13–15 April 2018	2,000	47% (Lula) cannot run in election	2% (Gomes)	9% (Barbosa)	7% (Silva)	1% (Temer)	2% (Dias)	3% (Alckmin)		12% (Bolsonaro)	–	0%	18%
Datafolha	9–13 April 2018	4,260	2% (Haddad)	9% (Gomes)	9% (Barbosa)	15% (Silva)	1% (Meirelles)	5% (Dias)	7% (Alckmin)		17% (Bolsonaro)	–	7%	26%
Datafolha	9–13 April 2018	4,260	2% (Haddad)	9% (Gomes)	9% (Barbosa)	15% (Silva)	2% (Temer)	4% (Dias)	7% (Alckmin)		17% (Bolsonaro)	–	8%	28%
Datafolha	9–13 April 2018	4,260	2% (Haddad)	9% (Gomes)	10% (Barbosa)	15% (Silva)	–	5% (Dias)	8% (Alckmin)		17% (Bolsonaro)	–	8%	27%
Datafolha	9–13 April 2018	4,260	31% (Lula) cannot run in election	5% (Gomes)	8% (Barbosa)	10% (Silva)	1% (Meirelles)	3% (Dias)	6% (Alckmin)		15% (Bolsonaro)	–	5%	16%
Datafolha	9–13 April 2018	4,260	30% (Lula) cannot run in election	5% (Gomes)	8% (Barbosa)	10% (Silva)	1% (Temer)	3% (Dias)	6% (Alckmin)		15% (Bolsonaro)	–	5%	16%
Datafolha	9–13 April 2018	4,260	31% (Lula) cannot run in election	5% (Gomes)	8% (Barbosa)	10% (Silva)	–	4% (Dias)	6% (Alckmin)		16% (Bolsonaro)	–	4%	15%
Datafolha	9–13 April 2018	4,260	1% (Wagner)	9% (Gomes)	9% (Barbosa)	15% (Silva)	1% (Meirelles)	4% (Dias)	8% (Alckmin)		17% (Bolsonaro)	–	9%	27%
Datafolha	9–13 April 2018	4,260	1% (Wagner)	9% (Gomes)	9% (Barbosa)	15% (Silva)	1% (Temer)	4% (Dias)	7% (Alckmin)		17% (Bolsonaro)	–	7%	26%
Datafolha	9–13 April 2018	4,260	–	9% (Gomes)	9% (Barbosa)	16% (Silva)	1% (Meirelles)	4% (Dias)	8% (Alckmin)		17% (Bolsonaro)	–	8%	26%
After Luiz Inácio Lula da Silva is sentenced to 12 years in prison by the Regional Federal Court of the 4th Region, the Supreme Federal Court rules to reject Lula's plea and an arrest warrant is given on 6 April 2018. The ruling of the TRF-4 bars Lula from running in the election

===== Jan–Mar =====
Polling firm/link	Date(s) administered	Sample size	PT	PDT	PSB	REDE	MDB	PODE	PSDB	NOVO	PSL	Not affiliated	Others	Abst. Undec.
MDA	28 February–3 March 2018	2,002	2.3% (Haddad)	8.1% (Gomes)	–	12.8% (Silva)	1.3% (Temer)	4.0% (Dias)	8.6% (Alckmin)		20.0% (Bolsonaro)	–	4.2%	38.7%
MDA	28 February–3 March 2018	2,002	2.9% (Haddad)	9.0% (Gomes)	–	13.9% (Silva)	1.3% (Temer)	4.7% (Dias)	–		20.9% (Bolsonaro)	–	5.2%	42.1%
MDA	28 February–3 March 2018	2,002	2.4% (Haddad)	8.1% (Gomes)	–	13.4% (Silva)	–	4.1% (Dias)	8.7% (Alckmin)		20.2% (Bolsonaro)	–	4.6%	38.5%
MDA	28 February–3 March 2018	2,002	33.4% (Lula)	4.3% (Gomes)	–	7.8% (Silva)	0.9% (Temer)	3.3% (Dias)	6.4% (Alckmin)		16.8% (Bolsonaro)	–	2.5%	24.6%
#PESQUISA365	2–7 February 2018	2,000	2.5% (Haddad)	9.6% (Gomes)	5.6% (Barbosa)	9.7% (Silva)	–	3.0% (Dias)	4.4% (Alckmin)		15.9% (Bolsonaro)	–	5.3%	44.5%
#PESQUISA365	2–7 February 2018	2,000	2.2% (Wagner)	10.1% (Gomes)	–	10.4% (Silva)	0.6% (Meirelles)	3.4% (Dias)	1.1% (Virgílio)		17.0% (Bolsonaro)	–	5.1%	50.7%
Datafolha	29–30 January 2018	2,826	34% (Lula)	6% (Gomes)	3% (Barbosa)	7% (Silva)	1% (Meirelles)	3% (Dias)	6% (Alckmin)		15% (Bolsonaro)	5% (Huck)	3%	15%
Datafolha	29–30 January 2018	2,826	34% (Lula)	6% (Gomes)	3% (Barbosa)	7% (Silva)	1% (Temer)	3% (Dias)	6% (Alckmin)		15% (Bolsonaro)	5% (Huck)	3%	15%
Datafolha	29–30 January 2018	2,826	34% (Lula)	6% (Gomes)	–	8% (Silva)	1% (Meirelles)	3% (Dias)	6% (Alckmin)		16% (Bolsonaro)	6% (Huck)	4%	16%
Datafolha	29–30 January 2018	2,826	35% (Lula)	7% (Gomes)	–	10% (Silva)	–	4% (Dias)	4% (Doria)		17% (Bolsonaro)	–	5%	18%
Datafolha	29–30 January 2018	2,826	37% (Lula)	7% (Gomes)	5% (Barbosa)	–	–	4% (Dias)	7% (Alckmin)		16% (Bolsonaro)	–	5%	20%
Datafolha	29–30 January 2018	2,826	36% (Lula)	7% (Gomes)	–	–	1% (Meirelles)	4% (Dias)	7% (Alckmin)		18% (Bolsonaro)	–	6%	22%
Datafolha	29–30 January 2018	2,826	2% (Wagner)	10% (Gomes)	–	13% (Silva)	1% (Meirelles)	5% (Dias)	8% (Alckmin)		18% (Bolsonaro)	8% (Huck)	6%	28%
Datafolha	29–30 January 2018	2,826	2% (Wagner)	12% (Gomes)	–	16% (Silva)	–	6% (Dias)	5% (Doria)		20% (Bolsonaro)	–	7%	32%
Datafolha	29–30 January 2018	2,826	2% (Wagner)	12% (Gomes)	5% (Barbosa)	–	–	6% (Dias)	11% (Alckmin)		19% (Bolsonaro)	–	9%	35%
Datafolha	29–30 January 2018	2,826	2% (Wagner)	13% (Gomes)	–	–	2% (Meirelles)	6% (Dias)	11% (Alckmin)		20% (Bolsonaro)	–	9%	36%

==== 2017 ====
Polling firm/link	Date(s) administered	Sample size	PT	PDT	PSB	REDE	MDB	PODE	PSDB	NOVO	PSL	Not affiliated	Others	Abst. Undec.
Paraná Pesquisas	18–21 December 2017	2,020	29.2% (Lula)	5.2% (Gomes)	6.8% (Barbosa)	8.6% (Silva)	0.9% (Meirelles)	3.5% (Dias)	7.9% (Alckmin)		21.1% (Bolsonaro)	–	0.9%	15.9%
Paraná Pesquisas	18–21 December 2017	2,020	13.4% (Rousseff)	7.7% (Gomes)	7.6% (Barbosa)	12.2% (Silva)	1.1% (Meirelles)	4.0% (Dias)	8.7% (Alckmin)		22.8% (Bolsonaro)	–	1.1%	21.4%
Paraná Pesquisas	18–21 December 2017	2,020	3.9% (Wagner)	8.2% (Gomes)	9.6% (Barbosa)	14.8% (Silva)	1.3% (Meirelles)	4.3% (Dias)	9.5% (Alckmin)		23.2% (Bolsonaro)	–	1.5%	23.7%
Vox Populi	9–12 December 2017	2,000	43% (Lula)	2% (Gomes)	7% (Barbosa)	5% (Silva)	1% (Meirelles)	1% (Dias)	4% (Alckmin)		13% (Bolsonaro)	–	0%	24%
Vox Populi	9–12 December 2017	2,000	45% (Lula)	3% (Gomes)	–	7% (Silva)	–	–	6% (Alckmin)		15% (Bolsonaro)	–	–	25%
DataPoder360	8–11 December 2017	2,210	5% (Haddad)	10% (Gomes)	–	10% (Silva)	–	–	7% (Alckmin)		23% (Bolsonaro)	–	–	46%
DataPoder360	8–11 December 2017	2,210	26% (Lula)	5% (Gomes)	–	7% (Silva)	1% (Meirelles)	2% (Dias)	4% (Alckmin)		21% (Bolsonaro)	–	14%	21%
DataPoder360	8–11 December 2017	2,210	30% (Lula)	6% (Gomes)	–	10% (Silva)	–	–	8% (Alckmin)		22% (Bolsonaro)	–	–	26%
Datafolha	29–30 November 2017	2,765	3% (Haddad)	12% (Gomes)	–	16% (Silva)	–	5% (Dias)	9% (Alckmin)		21% (Bolsonaro)	–	5%	28%
Datafolha	29–30 November 2017	2,765	3% (Haddad)	13% (Gomes)	–	17% (Silva)	–	6% (Dias)	6% (Doria)		21% (Bolsonaro)	–	5%	30%
Datafolha	29–30 November 2017	2,765	3% (Haddad)	12% (Gomes)	8% (Barbosa)	–	–	6% (Dias)	11% (Alckmin)		21% (Bolsonaro)	–	5%	32%
Datafolha	29–30 November 2017	2,765	3% (Haddad)	13% (Gomes)	–	–	2% (Meirelles)	6% (Dias)	12% (Alckmin)		22% (Bolsonaro)	–	7%	35%
Datafolha	29–30 November 2017	2,765	34% (Lula)	6% (Gomes)	5% (Barbosa)	9% (Silva)	1% (Temer)	3% (Dias)	6% (Alckmin)		17% (Bolsonaro)	–	2%	14%
Datafolha	29–30 November 2017	2,765	34% (Lula)	6% (Gomes)	5% (Barbosa)	9% (Silva)	1% (Meirelles)	3% (Dias)	6% (Alckmin)		17% (Bolsonaro)	–	2%	14%
Datafolha	29–30 November 2017	2,765	36% (Lula)	7% (Gomes)	–	10% (Silva)	–	4% (Dias)	7% (Alckmin)		18% (Bolsonaro)	–	3%	15%
Datafolha	29–30 November 2017	2,765	36% (Lula)	7% (Gomes)	–	11% (Silva)	–	4% (Dias)	5% (Doria)		18% (Bolsonaro)	–	4%	16%
Datafolha	29–30 November 2017	2,765	37% (Lula)	7% (Gomes)	6% (Barbosa)	–	–	4% (Dias)	8% (Alckmin)		18% (Bolsonaro)	–	3%	17%
Datafolha	29–30 November 2017	2,765	37% (Lula)	7% (Gomes)	–	–	1% (Meirelles)	4% (Dias)	9% (Alckmin)		19% (Bolsonaro)	–	4%	17%
DataPoder360	16–18 November 2017	2,171	4% (Haddad)	12% (Gomes)	–	12% (Silva)	–	–	9% (Alckmin)		22% (Bolsonaro)	–	–	42%
DataPoder360	16–18 November 2017	2,171	5% (Haddad)	14% (Gomes)	–	14% (Silva)	–	–	3% (Doria)		22% (Bolsonaro)	–	–	43%
DataPoder360	16–18 November 2017	2,171	26% (Lula)	4% (Gomes)	–	8% (Silva)	–	–	7% (Alckmin)		25% (Bolsonaro)	–	–	29%
DataPoder360	16–18 November 2017	2,171	26% (Lula)	8% (Gomes)	–	8% (Silva)	–	–	9% (Doria)		18% (Bolsonaro)	–	–	32%
Vox Populi	27–30 October 2017	2,000	42% (Lula)	4% (Gomes)	–	7% (Silva)	0% (Temer)	1% (Dias)	5% (Alckmin)		16% (Bolsonaro)	–	1%	23%
Vox Populi	27–30 October 2017	2,000	41% (Lula)	4% (Gomes)	–	7% (Silva)	–	1% (Dias)	5% (Alckmin)		16% (Bolsonaro)	2% (Huck)	2%	22%
Vox Populi	27–30 October 2017	2,000	42% (Lula)	4% (Gomes)	–	8% (Silva)	–	–	5% (Alckmin)		17% (Bolsonaro)	–	–	24%
Vox Populi	27–30 October 2017	2,000	43% (Lula)	5% (Gomes)	–	8% (Silva)	–	–	3% (Doria)		16% (Bolsonaro)	–	–	24%
DataPoder360	26–29 October 2017	2,016	4% (Haddad)	14% (Gomes)	–	9% (Silva)	–	–	10% (Alckmin)		23% (Bolsonaro)	–	–	40%
DataPoder360	26–29 October 2017	2,016	7% (Haddad)	11% (Gomes)	–	13% (Silva)	–	–	8% (Doria)		24% (Bolsonaro)	–	–	37%
DataPoder360	26–29 October 2017	2,016	28% (Lula)	5% (Gomes)	–	6% (Silva)	–	–	7% (Alckmin)		25% (Bolsonaro)	–	–	29%
DataPoder360	26–29 October 2017	2,016	32% (Lula)	6% (Gomes)	–	5% (Silva)	–	–	9% (Doria)		20% (Bolsonaro)	–	–	28%
IBOPE	18–22 October 2017	2,002	1% (Haddad)	7% (Gomes)	–	15% (Silva)	1% (Meirelles)	3% (Dias)	7% (Alckmin)		15% (Bolsonaro)	8% (Huck)	3%	34%
IBOPE	18–22 October 2017	2,002	1% (Haddad)	7% (Gomes)	–	15% (Silva)	1% (Meirelles)	3% (Dias)	5% (Doria)		15% (Bolsonaro)	8% (Huck)	3%	34%
IBOPE	18–22 October 2017	2,002	2% (Haddad)	9% (Gomes)	–	18% (Silva)	1% (Meirelles)	4% (Dias)	8% (Alckmin)		18% (Bolsonaro)	–	4%	36%
IBOPE	18–22 October 2017	2,002	2% (Haddad)	11% (Gomes)	–	19% (Silva)	1% (Meirelles)	4% (Dias)	6% (Doria)		17% (Bolsonaro)	–	3%	37%
IBOPE	18–22 October 2017	2,002	35% (Lula)	3% (Gomes)	–	8% (Silva)	0% (Meirelles)	2% (Dias)	5% (Alckmin)		13% (Bolsonaro)	5% (Huck)	2%	23%
IBOPE	18–22 October 2017	2,002	35% (Lula)	3% (Gomes)	–	8% (Silva)	0% (Meirelles)	2% (Dias)	4% (Doria)		13% (Bolsonaro)	5% (Huck)	2%	23%
IBOPE	18–22 October 2017	2,002	35% (Lula)	5% (Gomes)	–	11% (Silva)	0% (Meirelles)	3% (Dias)	7% (Alckmin)		15% (Bolsonaro)	–	3%	23%
IBOPE	18–22 October 2017	2,002	36% (Lula)	5% (Gomes)	–	11% (Silva)	1% (Meirelles)	3% (Dias)	5% (Doria)		15% (Bolsonaro)	–	2%	22%
Datafolha	27–28 September 2017	2,772	3% (Haddad)	9% (Gomes)	–	22% (Silva)	2% (Meirelles)	5% (Dias)	9% (Alckmin)		19% (Bolsonaro)	–	3%	28%
Datafolha	27–28 September 2017	2,772	2% (Haddad)	7% (Gomes)	5% (Barbosa)	17% (Silva)	2% (Meirelles)	3% (Dias)	8% (Alckmin)		15% (Bolsonaro)	9% (Moro)	3%	23%
Datafolha	27–28 September 2017	2,772	2% (Haddad)	7% (Gomes)	5% (Barbosa)	17% (Silva)	2% (Meirelles)	3% (Dias)	6% (Doria)		15% (Bolsonaro)	9% (Moro)	3%	23%
Datafolha	27–28 September 2017	2,772	2% (Haddad)	9% (Gomes)	–	20% (Silva)	2% (Meirelles)	5% (Dias)	9% (Alckmin)		17% (Bolsonaro)	–	2%	27%
Datafolha	27–28 September 2017	2,772	2% (Haddad)	9% (Gomes)	–	20% (Silva)	2% (Meirelles)	5% (Dias)	7% (Doria)		17% (Bolsonaro)	–	2%	27%
Datafolha	27–28 September 2017	2,772	35% (Lula)	4% (Gomes)	–	13% (Silva)	2% (Meirelles)	4% (Dias)	8% (Alckmin)		17% (Bolsonaro)	–	1%	17%
Datafolha	27–28 September 2017	2,772	35% (Lula)	–	–	13% (Silva)	2% (Meirelles)	4% (Dias)	8% (Alckmin)		17% (Bolsonaro)	–	2%	18%
Datafolha	27–28 September 2017	2,772	36% (Lula)	–	–	14% (Silva)	2% (Meirelles)	4% (Dias)	8% (Doria)		16% (Bolsonaro)	–	2%	18%
Datafolha	27–28 September 2017	2,772	–	10% (Gomes)	–	22% (Silva)	2% (Meirelles)	5% (Dias)	10% (Alckmin)		19% (Bolsonaro)	–	3%	29%
Datafolha	27–28 September 2017	2,772	–	10% (Gomes)	–	23% (Silva)	2% (Meirelles)	5% (Dias)	10% (Doria)		18% (Bolsonaro)	–	3%	29%
Paraná Pesquisas	18–22 September 2017	2,040	4.0% (Haddad)	7.5% (Gomes)	9.7% (Barbosa)	15.3% (Silva)	2.2% (Meirelles)	4.6% (Dias)	9.7% (Alckmin)		20.9% (Bolsonaro)	–	–	26.2%
Paraná Pesquisas	18–22 September 2017	2,040	3.4% (Haddad)	7.4% (Gomes)	8.9% (Barbosa)	15.4% (Silva)	2.3% (Meirelles)	4.4% (Dias)	13.5% (Doria)		19.6% (Bolsonaro)	–	–	25.3%
Paraná Pesquisas	18–22 September 2017	2,040	26.5% (Lula)	4.5% (Gomes)	8.3% (Barbosa)	9.8% (Silva)	1.6% (Meirelles)	3.9% (Dias)	8.4% (Alckmin)		20.0% (Bolsonaro)	–	–	17.0%
Paraná Pesquisas	18–22 September 2017	2,040	26.6% (Lula)	4.3% (Gomes)	7.5% (Barbosa)	9.7% (Silva)	1.5% (Meirelles)	3.8% (Dias)	11.5% (Doria)		18.5% (Bolsonaro)	–	–	16.5%
DataPoder360	15–17 September 2017	2,280	4% (Haddad)	11% (Gomes)	–	12% (Silva)	–	–	7% (Alckmin)		26% (Bolsonaro)	–	–	41%
DataPoder360	15–17 September 2017	2,280	3% (Haddad)	11% (Gomes)	–	13% (Silva)	–	–	8% (Doria)		26% (Bolsonaro)	–	–	40%
DataPoder360	15–17 September 2017	2,280	27% (Lula)	6% (Gomes)	–	6% (Silva)	–	–	5% (Alckmin)		24% (Bolsonaro)	–	–	32%
DataPoder360	15–17 September 2017	2,280	28% (Lula)	6% (Gomes)	–	7% (Silva)	–	–	10% (Doria)		20% (Bolsonaro)	–	–	28%
MDA	13–16 September 2017	2,002	32.0% (Lula)	4.6% (Gomes)	–	11.4% (Silva)	–	–	8.7% (Alckmin)		19.4% (Bolsonaro)	–	–	23.9%
MDA	13–16 September 2017	2,002	32.7% (Lula)	5.2% (Gomes)	–	12.0% (Silva)	–	–	9.4% (Doria)		18.4% (Bolsonaro)	–	–	22;3%
MDA	13–16 September 2017	2,002	32.4% (Lula)	5.3% (Gomes)	–	12.1% (Silva)	–	–	3.2% (Neves)		19.8% (Bolsonaro)	–	–	27.2%
DataPoder360	12–14 August 2017	2,088	3% (Haddad)	8% (Gomes)	–	8% (Silva)	–	–	9% (Alckmin)		27% (Bolsonaro)	–	–	45%
DataPoder360	12–14 August 2017	2,088	5% (Haddad)	9% (Gomes)	–	6% (Silva)	–	–	12% (Doria)		25% (Bolsonaro)	–	–	44%
DataPoder360	12–14 August 2017	2,088	32% (Lula)	4% (Gomes)	–	3% (Silva)	–	–	4% (Alckmin)		25% (Bolsonaro)	–	–	33%
DataPoder360	12–14 August 2017	2,088	31% (Lula)	6% (Gomes)	–	3% (Silva)	–	–	12% (Doria)		18% (Bolsonaro)	–	–	30%
Vox Populi	29–31 July 2017	1,999	47% (Lula)	3% (Gomes)	–	6% (Silva)	1% (Temer)	–	5% (Alckmin)		13% (Bolsonaro)	–	2%	22%
Vox Populi	29–31 July 2017	1,999	47% (Lula)	3% (Gomes)	–	7% (Silva)	–	–	6% (Alckmin)		13% (Bolsonaro)	–	–	23%
Vox Populi	29–31 July 2017	1,999	48% (Lula)	4% (Gomes)	–	8% (Silva)	–	–	4% (Doria)		13% (Bolsonaro)	–	–	24%
Paraná Pesquisas	24–27 July 2017	2,020	26.1% (Lula)	4.5% (Gomes)	9.8% (Barbosa)	7.0% (Silva)	–	4.1% (Dias)	7.3% (Alckmin)		20.8% (Bolsonaro)	–	–	20.5%
Paraná Pesquisas	24–27 July 2017	2,020	25.8% (Lula)	4.5% (Gomes)	8.7% (Barbosa)	7.1% (Silva)	–	3.5% (Dias)	12.3% (Doria)		18.7% (Bolsonaro)	–	–	19.6%
DataPoder360	9–10 July 2017	2,178	26% (Lula)	5% (Gomes)	–	6% (Silva)	–	–	10% (Alckmin)		21% (Bolsonaro)	–	–	34%
DataPoder360	9–10 July 2017	2,178	23% (Lula)	4% (Gomes)	–	12% (Silva)	–	–	13% (Doria)		21% (Bolsonaro)	–	–	27%
Datafolha	21–23 June 2017	2,771	3% (Haddad)	–	13% (Barbosa)	22% (Silva)	–	–	10% (Alckmin)		16% (Bolsonaro)	–	8%	28%
Datafolha	21–23 June 2017	2,771	30% (Lula)	5% (Gomes)	–	15% (Silva)	–	–	8% (Alckmin)		16% (Bolsonaro)	–	6%	20%
Datafolha	21–23 June 2017	2,771	30% (Lula)	6% (Gomes)	–	15% (Silva)	–	–	10% (Doria)		15% (Bolsonaro)	–	6%	18%
Datafolha	21–23 June 2017	2,771	30% (Lula)	–	11% (Barbosa)	15% (Silva)	–	–	8% (Alckmin)		15% (Bolsonaro)	–	6%	16%
Datafolha	21–23 June 2017	2,771	29% (Lula)	–	10% (Barbosa)	15% (Silva)	–	–	9% (Doria)		13% (Bolsonaro)	–	5%	17%
Datafolha	21–23 June 2017	2,771	29% (Lula)	–	–	14% (Silva)	–	–	6% (Alckmin)		13% (Bolsonaro)	14% (Moro)	5%	17%
Datafolha	21–23 June 2017	2,771	–	9% (Gomes)	12% (Barbosa)	22% (Silva)	–	–	9% (Alckmin)		16% (Bolsonaro)	–	7%	26%
Datafolha	21–23 June 2017	2,771	–	12% (Gomes)	–	27% (Silva)	–	–	14% (Doria)		18% (Bolsonaro)	–	–	29%
DataPoder360	17–19 June 2017	2,096	27% (Lula)	5% (Gomes)	–	5% (Silva)	–	–	7% (Alckmin)		14% (Bolsonaro)	–	–	43%
DataPoder360	17–19 June 2017	2,096	27% (Lula)	6% (Gomes)	–	6% (Silva)	–	–	11% (Doria)		15% (Bolsonaro)	–	–	35%
Vox Populi	2–4 June 2017	2,000	45% (Lula)	4% (Gomes)	–	8% (Silva)	–	–	4% (Alckmin)		13% (Bolsonaro)	–	–	25%
Vox Populi	2–4 June 2017	2,000	45% (Lula)	5% (Gomes)	–	9% (Silva)	–	–	4% (Doria)		12% (Bolsonaro)	–	–	25%
Vox Populi	2–4 June 2017	2,000	46% (Lula)	5% (Gomes)	–	9% (Silva)	–	–	1% (Neves)		13% (Bolsonaro)	–	–	26%
Paraná Pesquisas	25–29 May 2017	2,022	3.1% (Haddad)	6.7% (Gomes)	8.7% (Barbosa)	14.9% (Silva)	–	–	13.6% (Doria)		17.2% (Bolsonaro)	–	7.4%	28.3%
Paraná Pesquisas	25–29 May 2017	2,022	25.4% (Lula)	4.2% (Gomes)	8.1% (Barbosa)	10.4% (Silva)	–	–	6.4% (Alckmin)		16.8% (Bolsonaro)	7.3% (Huck)	2.9%	18.5%
Paraná Pesquisas	25–29 May 2017	2,022	25.8% (Lula)	4.3% (Gomes)	8.1% (Barbosa)	11.1% (Silva)	–	–	12.1% (Doria)		16.1% (Bolsonaro)	–	3.1%	19.4%
DataPoder360	7–8 May 2017	2,157	25% (Lula)	5% (Gomes)	–	7% (Silva)	–	–	4% (Alckmin)		21% (Bolsonaro)	–	–	38%
DataPoder360	7–8 May 2017	2,157	27% (Lula)	6% (Gomes)	–	6% (Silva)	–	–	13% (Doria)		17% (Bolsonaro)	–	–	32%
Datafolha	26–27 April 2017	2,781	30% (Lula)	6% (Gomes)	–	16% (Silva)	2% (Temer)	–	6% (Alckmin)		14% (Bolsonaro)	–	5%	26%
Datafolha	26–27 April 2017	2,781	31% (Lula)	6% (Gomes)	–	16% (Silva)	2% (Temer)	–	9% (Doria)		13% (Bolsonaro)	–	4%	26%
Datafolha	26–27 April 2017	2,781	30% (Lula)	5% (Gomes)	–	14% (Silva)	2% (Temer)	–	8% (Neves)		15% (Bolsonaro)	–	4%	21%
Datafolha	26–27 April 2017	2,781	–	11% (Gomes)	–	25% (Silva)	–	–	8% (Alckmin)		16% (Bolsonaro)	–	8%	33%
Datafolha	26–27 April 2017	2,781	–	12% (Gomes)	–	25% (Silva)	–	–	11% (Doria)		14% (Bolsonaro)	–	7%	31%
DataPoder360	16–17 April 2017	2,058	24% (Lula)	5% (Gomes)	–	11% (Silva)	–	–	8% (Alckmin)		18% (Bolsonaro)	–	–	34%
DataPoder360	16–17 April 2017	2,058	25% (Lula)	5% (Gomes)	–	9% (Silva)	–	–	13% (Doria)		14% (Bolsonaro)	–	–	33%
DataPoder360	16–17 April 2017	2,058	25% (Lula)	4% (Gomes)	–	11% (Silva)	–	–	7% (Neves)		19% (Bolsonaro)	–	–	35%
Vox Populi	6–10 April 2017	2,000	45% (Lula)	4% (Gomes)	–	11% (Silva)	–	–	6% (Alckmin)		12% (Bolsonaro)	–	–	23%
Vox Populi	6–10 April 2017	2,000	45% (Lula)	5% (Gomes)	–	11% (Silva)	–	–	6% (Doria)		11% (Bolsonaro)	–	–	23%
Vox Populi	6–10 April 2017	2,000	44% (Lula)	4% (Gomes)	–	10% (Silva)	–	–	9% (Neves)		11% (Bolsonaro)	–	–	22%
Paraná Pesquisas	12–15 February 2017	2,020	22.9% (Lula)	4.7% (Gomes)	11.5% (Barbosa)	12.8% (Silva)	3.8% (Temer)	–	11.9% (Alckmin)		12.2% (Bolsonaro)	–	1.9%	18.1%
Paraná Pesquisas	12–15 February 2017	2,020	23.3% (Lula)	5.6% (Gomes)	11.3% (Barbosa)	13.7% (Silva)	4.3% (Temer)	–	9.1% (Doria)		11.9% (Bolsonaro)	–	1.6%	19.1%
Paraná Pesquisas	12–15 February 2017	2,020	22.6% (Lula)	4.9% (Gomes)	11.7% (Barbosa)	12.6% (Silva)	3.8% (Temer)	–	12.9% (Neves)		12.0% (Bolsonaro)	–	2.0%	17.6%
MDA	8–11 February 2017	2,002	31.8% (Lula)	5.3% (Gomes)	–	12.1% (Silva)	–	–	9.1% (Alckmin)		11.7% (Bolsonaro)	–	–	29%
MDA	8–11 February 2017	2,002	30.5% (Lula)	5% (Gomes)	–	11.8% (Silva)	3.7% (Temer)	–	10.1% (Neves)		11.3% (Bolsonaro)	–	–	26.6%
MDA	8–11 February 2017	2,002	32.8% (Lula)	–	–	13.9% (Silva)	–	–	12.1% (Neves)		12% (Bolsonaro)	–	–	29.2%

==== 2016 ====
Polling firm/link	Date(s) administered	Sample size	PT	PDT	PSB	REDE	MDB	PODE	PSDB	NOVO	PSL	Not affiliated	Others	Abst. Undec.
Vox Populi	10–14 December 2016	2,500	38% (Lula)	5% (Gomes)	–	12% (Silva)	–	–	10% (Alckmin)		7% (Bolsonaro)	–	–	28%
Vox Populi	10–14 December 2016	2,500	37% (Lula)	4% (Gomes)	–	10% (Silva)	–	–	13% (Neves)		7% (Bolsonaro)	–	–	29%
Datafolha	7–8 December 2016	2,828	26% (Lula)	6% (Gomes)	–	17% (Silva)	4% (Temer)	–	8% (Alckmin)		8% (Bolsonaro)	–	5%	26%
Datafolha	7–8 December 2016	2,828	25% (Lula)	5% (Gomes)	–	15% (Silva)	4% (Temer)	–	11% (Neves)		9% (Bolsonaro)	–	5%	26%
Datafolha	7–8 December 2016	2,828	25% (Lula)	6% (Gomes)	–	16% (Silva)	4% (Temer)	–	9% (Serra)		9% (Bolsonaro)	–	5%	26%
MDA	13–16 October 2016	2,002	25.3% (Lula)	8.4% (Gomes)	–	14.0% (Silva)	6.1% (Temer)	–	13.4% (Alckmin)		6.9% (Bolsonaro)	–	–	25.9%
MDA	13–16 October 2016	2,002	24.8% (Lula)	7.4% (Gomes)	–	13.3% (Silva)	6.2% (Temer)	–	15.7% (Neves)		6.5% (Bolsonaro)	–	–	26.1%
MDA	13–16 October 2016	2,002	27.6% (Lula)	–	–	16.5% (Silva)	–	–	18.9% (Neves)		7.9% (Bolsonaro)	–	–	29.1%
Vox Populi	9–13 October 2016	2,000	35% (Lula)	6% (Gomes)	–	13% (Silva)	–	–	12% (Alckmin)		7% (Bolsonaro)	–	–	28%
Vox Populi	9–13 October 2016	2,000	34% (Lula)	5% (Gomes)	–	11% (Silva)	–	–	15% (Neves)		7% (Bolsonaro)	–	–	27%
Vox Populi	29 July–1 August 2016	1,500	29% (Lula)	6% (Gomes)	–	18% (Silva)	–	–	11% (Alckmin)		7% (Bolsonaro)	–	–	29%
Vox Populi	29 July–1 August 2016	1,500	28% (Lula)	6% (Gomes)	–	15% (Silva)	–	–	18% (Neves)		7% (Bolsonaro)	–	–	27%
Vox Populi	29 July–1 August 2016	1,500	29% (Lula)	6% (Gomes)	–	19% (Silva)	–	–	13% (Serra)		7% (Bolsonaro)	–	–	27%
Datafolha	14–15 July 2016	2,792	23% (Lula)	6% (Gomes)	–	18% (Silva)	6% (Temer)	–	8% (Alckmin)		8% (Bolsonaro)	–	5%	27%
Datafolha	14–15 July 2016	2,792	22% (Lula)	5% (Gomes)	–	17% (Silva)	5% (Temer)	–	14% (Neves)		7% (Bolsonaro)	–	4%	25%
Datafolha	14–15 July 2016	2,792	23% (Lula)	6% (Gomes)	–	17% (Silva)	6% (Temer)	–	11% (Serra)		7% (Bolsonaro)	–	5%	26%
Vox Populi	June 2016	–	29% (Lula)	6% (Gomes)	–	18% (Silva)	–	–	16% (Neves)		6% (Bolsonaro)	–	–	25%
MDA	2–5 June 2016	2,002	22.3% (Lula)	6.3% (Gomes)	–	16.6% (Silva)	6.2% (Temer)	–	9.6% (Alckmin)		6.2% (Bolsonaro)	–	–	32.8%
MDA	2–5 June 2016	2,002	22% (Lula)	6% (Gomes)	–	14.8% (Silva)	5.4% (Temer)	–	15.9% (Neves)		5.8% (Bolsonaro)	–	–	30.1%
Vox Populi	9–12 April 2016	–	29% (Lula)	5% (Gomes)	–	18% (Silva)	–	–	17% (Neves)		7% (Bolsonaro)	–	–	23%
Vox Populi	9–12 April 2016	–	31% (Lula)	–	–	23% (Silva)	–	–	20% (Neves)		–	–	–	26%
Datafolha	7–8 April 2016	2,779	22% (Lula)	8% (Gomes)	–	23% (Silva)	2% (Temer)	–	9% (Alckmin)		8% (Bolsonaro)	–	4%	24%
Datafolha	7–8 April 2016	2,779	21% (Lula)	7% (Gomes)	–	19% (Silva)	2% (Temer)	–	17% (Neves)		8% (Bolsonaro)	–	4%	22%
Datafolha	7–8 April 2016	2,779	22% (Lula)	7% (Gomes)	–	22% (Silva)	2% (Temer)	–	11% (Serra)		7% (Bolsonaro)	–	4%	24%
Paraná Pesquisas	3–6 April 2016	2,044	15.4% (Lula)	6.7% (Gomes)	–	24.7% (Silva)	1.9% (Temer)	3.2% (Dias)	18.3% (Alckmin)		8.3% (Bolsonaro)	–	2.9%	18.6%
Paraná Pesquisas	3–6 April 2016	2,044	15.7% (Lula)	6.4% (Gomes)	–	21.0% (Silva)	1.9% (Temer)	2.7% (Dias)	23.5% (Neves)		8.4% (Bolsonaro)	–	2.9%	17.6%
Paraná Pesquisas	3–6 April 2016	2,044	15.4% (Lula)	6.9% (Gomes)	–	24.8% (Silva)	1.9% (Temer)	2.9% (Dias)	18.0% (Serra)		8.5% (Bolsonaro)	–	2.9%	18.7%
Datafolha	17–18 March 2016	–	17% (Lula)	7% (Gomes)	–	23% (Silva)	2% (Temer)	–	11% (Alckmin)		6% (Bolsonaro)	–	6%	27%
Datafolha	17–18 March 2016	–	17% (Lula)	6% (Gomes)	–	21% (Silva)	1% (Temer)	–	19% (Neves)		6% (Bolsonaro)	–	7%	24%
Datafolha	17–18 March 2016	–	17% (Lula)	7% (Gomes)	–	24% (Silva)	1% (Temer)	–	13% (Serra)		7% (Bolsonaro)	–	7%	25%
Paraná Pesquisas	28 February–2 March 2016	2,022	16.9% (Lula)	6.5% (Gomes)	–	22.3% (Silva)	–	3.1% (Dias)	16.6% (Alckmin)		8.7% (Bolsonaro)	–	6.0%	19.9%
Paraná Pesquisas	28 February–2 March 2016	2,022	16.8% (Lula)	4.7% (Gomes)	–	18.2% (Silva)	–	2.7% (Dias)	27.6% (Neves)		8.4% (Bolsonaro)	–	4.9%	16.7%
Datafolha	24–25 February 2016	–	20% (Lula)	6% (Gomes)	–	23% (Silva)	2% (Temer)	–	12% (Alckmin)		7% (Bolsonaro)	–	5%	25%
Datafolha	24–25 February 2016	–	20% (Lula)	5% (Gomes)	–	19% (Silva)	1% (Temer)	–	24% (Neves)		6% (Bolsonaro)	–	4%	21%
Datafolha	24–25 February 2016	–	21% (Lula)	5% (Gomes)	–	23% (Silva)	2% (Temer)	–	15% (Serra)		6% (Bolsonaro)	–	5%	24%
MDA	18–21 February 2016	2,002	19.7% (Lula)	7.4% (Gomes)	–	18.0% (Silva)	–	–	13.8% (Alckmin)		6.3% (Bolsonaro)	–	–	34.8%
MDA	18–21 February 2016	2,002	19.1% (Lula)	5.8% (Gomes)	–	14.7% (Silva)	–	–	24.6% (Neves)		6.1% (Bolsonaro)	–	–	29.7%
MDA	18–21 February 2016	2,002	19.7% (Lula)	7.2% (Gomes)	–	17.8% (Silva)	–	–	14.5% (Serra)		6.4% (Bolsonaro)	–	–	34.4%

==== 2015 ====
Polling firm/link	Date(s) administered	Sample size	PT	PDT	PSB	REDE	MDB	PODE	PSDB	NOVO	PSL	Not affiliated	Others	Abst. Undec.
Datafolha	16–17 December 2015	–	22% (Lula)	7% (Gomes)	–	24% (Silva)	1% (Temer)	–	14% (Alckmin)		5% (Bolsonaro)	–	4%	23%
Datafolha	16–17 December 2015	–	20% (Lula)	6% (Gomes)	–	19% (Silva)	2% (Temer)	–	27% (Neves)		4% (Bolsonaro)	–	3%	19%
Datafolha	25–26 November 2015	3,541	22% (Lula)	–	–	28% (Silva)	–	–	18% (Alckmin)		–	–	8%	23%
Datafolha	25–26 November 2015	3,541	22% (Lula)	–	–	21% (Silva)	–	–	31% (Neves)		–	–	7%	19%
Datafolha	25–26 November 2015	3,541	22% (Lula)	–	–	28% (Silva)	2% (Temer)	–	18% (Alckmin)		–	–	7%	24%
Datafolha	25–26 November 2015	3,541	22% (Lula)	–	–	21% (Silva)	2% (Temer)	–	31% (Neves)		–	–	5%	19%
Paraná Pesquisas	28 October–2 November 2015	2,085	18.2% (Lula)	6.1% (Gomes)	–	24.3% (Silva)	1.6% (Temer)	–	22.6% (Alckmin)		5.7% (Bolsonaro)	–	1.4%	20.1%
Paraná Pesquisas	28 October–2 November 2015	2,085	17.1% (Lula)	5.2% (Gomes)	–	19.7% (Silva)	1.5% (Temer)	–	34.2% (Neves)		5.3% (Bolsonaro)	–	1.0%	16.0%
Paraná Pesquisas	28 October–2 November 2015	2,085	17.7% (Lula)	6.0% (Gomes)	–	23.8% (Silva)	2.0% (Temer)	–	25.5% (Serra)		5.8% (Bolsonaro)	–	1.4%	17.8%
MDA	20–24 October 2015	2,002	23.1% (Lula)	–	–	27.8% (Silva)	–	–	19.9% (Alckmin)		–	–	–	29.2%
MDA	20–24 October 2015	2,002	21.6% (Lula)	–	–	21.3% (Silva)	–	–	32.0% (Neves)		–	–	–	25.1%
MDA	20–24 October 2015	2,002	23.5% (Lula)	–	–	27.9% (Silva)	–	–	19.6% (Serra)		–	–	–	29.0%
MDA	12–16 July 2015	2,002	24.9% (Lula)	–	–	23.1% (Silva)	–	–	21.5% (Alckmin)		5.1% (Bolsonaro)	–	–	25.4%
MDA	12–16 July 2015	2,002	22.8% (Lula)	–	–	15.6% (Silva)	–	–	35.1% (Neves)		4.6% (Bolsonaro)	–	–	21.9%
MDA	12–16 July 2015	2,002	25.0% (Lula)	–	–	23.3% (Silva)	–	–	21.2% (Serra)		5.5% (Bolsonaro)	–	–	25.0%
Datafolha	17–18 June 2015	2,840	26% (Lula)	–	–	25% (Silva)	–	–	20% (Alckmin)		–	–	8%	21%
Datafolha	17–18 June 2015	2,840	25% (Lula)	–	–	18% (Silva)	–	–	35% (Neves)		–	–	6%	16%
Datafolha	9–10 April 2015	2,834	29% (Lula)	–	13% (Barbosa)	14% (Silva)	–	–	33% (Neves)		–	–	3%	9%
Paraná Pesquisas	26–31 March 2015	2,022	17.9% (Lula)	–	–	24.3% (Silva)	–	–	37.1% (Neves)		–	–	–	20.6%
Paraná Pesquisas	26–31 March 2015	2,022	16.4% (Rousseff)	–	–	27.6% (Silva)	–	–	39.2% (Neves)		–	–	–	16.8%
2014 election	5 October 2014	115,122,611	41.6% (Rousseff)	–	21.3% (Silva)	–	–	–	33.6% (Neves)		–	–	24.8%	19.4%

- 1.Blank or null votes counted apart

=== Second round ===
==== Graphical summary ====
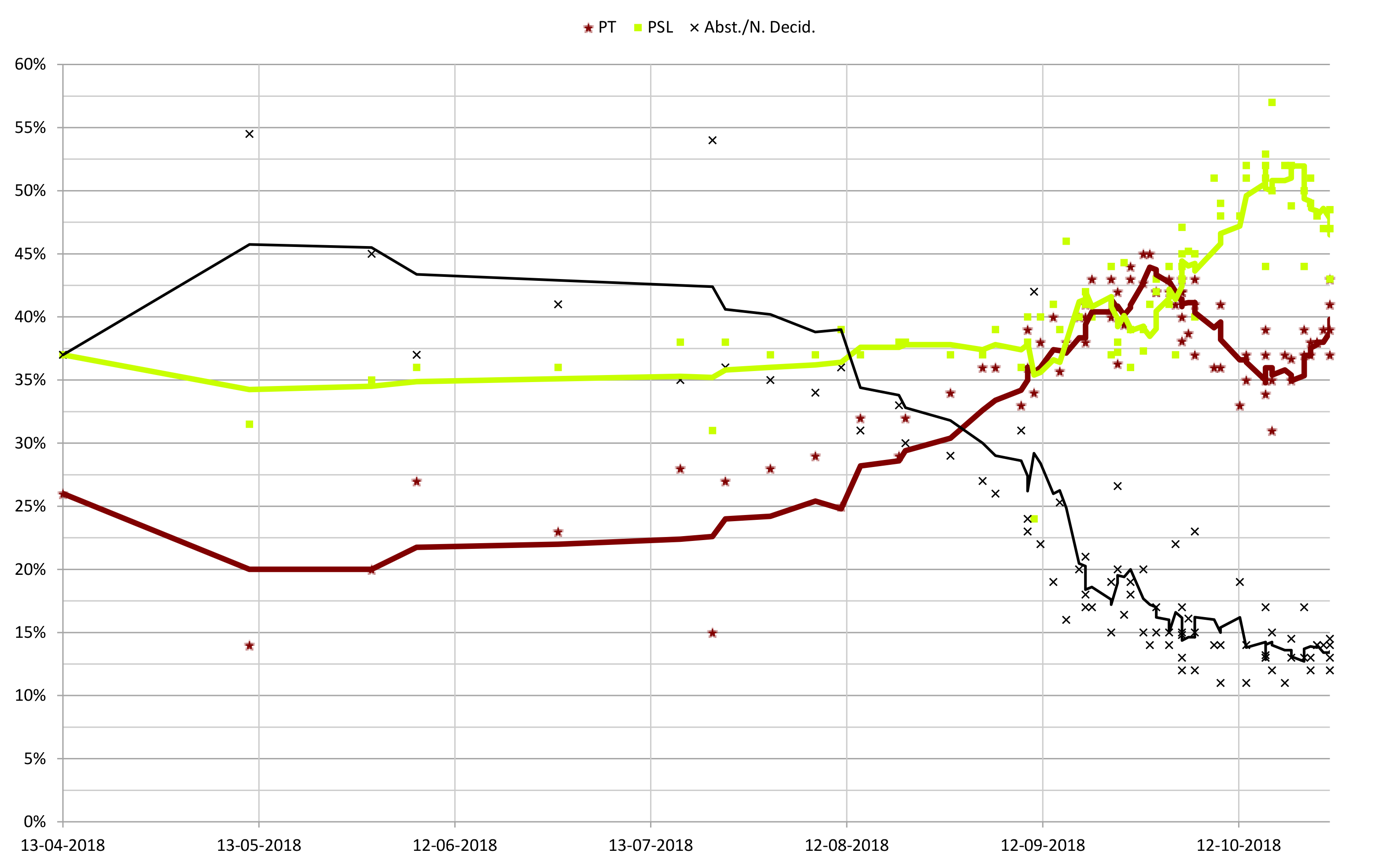
Graph showing 5 poll average trend lines of Brazilian opinion polls for the second round Fernando Haddad (PT) and Bolsonaro (PSL) from April 2018 to the most recent one.

===== After the first round =====
Polling firm/link	Date(s) administered	Sample size	Haddad	Bolsonaro	Abst. Undec.
Results of the second round	–	–	44,87%	55,13%	–
Datafolha	26–27 October 2018	18,731	39%	47%	13%
Ibope	26–27 October 2018	3,010	41%	47%	12%
CNT/MDA	26–27 October 2018	2,002	37%	49%	14%
Datafolha	24–25 October 2018	9,173	38%	48%	14%
Paraná Pesquisas	23–25 October 2018	2,120	35%	53%	12%
RealTime Big Data	24 October 2018	5,000	38%	49%	13%
Ipespe	23–24 October 2018	2,000	37%	51%	12%
Ibope	21–23 October 2018	3,010	37%	50%	13%
FSB Pesquisa	20–21 October 2018	2,000	35%	52%	13%
CNT/MDA	20–21 October 2018	2,002	37%	49%	14%
RealTime Big Data	19–20 October 2018	5,000	37%	52%	11%
DataPoder360	17–18 October 2018	4,000	31%	57%	12%
Datafolha	17–18 October 2018	9,137	35%	50%	15%
RealTime Big Data	16–17 October 2018	5,000	35%	52%	13%
Ipespe	15–17 October 2018	2,000	37%	51%	13%
Paraná Pesquisas	14–17 October 2018	2,080	34%	53%	13%
Ibope	13–14 October 2018	2,506	37%	52%	12%
FSB Pesquisa	13–14 October 2018	2,000	35%	51%	14%
RealTime Big Data	12–13 October 2018	5,000	33%	48%	19%
Datafolha	10 October 2018	3,235	36%	49%	15%
Idea Big Data	8–10 October 2018	2,036	41%	48%	11%
Ipespe	8–9 October 2018	2,000	36%	51%	13%

===== Before the first round =====
Polling firm/link	Date(s) administered	Sample Size	PT	PDT	PSB	REDE	MDB	PODE	PSDB	PSL	Not affiliated	Abst. Undec.
Ibope	5–6 October 2018	3,010	41% (Haddad)	–	–	–	–	–	–	45% (Bolsonaro)	–	15%
Ibope	5–6 October 2018	3,010	–	45% (Gomes)	–	–	–	–	–	41% (Bolsonaro)	–	13%
Ibope	5–6 October 2018	3,010	–	–	–	36% (Silva)	–	–	–	46% (Bolsonaro)	–	18%
Ibope	5–6 October 2018	3,010	–	–	–	–	–	–	40% (Alckmin)	43% (Bolsonaro)	–	17%
Datafolha	5–6 October 2018	19,552	38% (Haddad)	–	–	–	–	–	41% (Alckmin)	–	–	20%
Datafolha	5–6 October 2018	19,552	43% (Haddad)	–	–	–	–	–	–	45% (Bolsonaro)	–	12%
Datafolha	5–6 October 2018	19,552	–	47% (Gomes)	–	–	–	–	–	43% (Bolsonaro)	–	10%
Datafolha	5–6 October 2018	19,552	–	–	–	–	–	–	41% (Alckmin)	43% (Bolsonaro)	–	15%
CNT/MDA	4–5 October 2018	2,002	31.1% (Haddad)	40.9% (Gomes)	–	–	–	–	–	–	–	28.0%
CNT/MDA	4–5 October 2018	2,002	37.0% (Haddad)	–	–	–	–	–	34.3% (Alckmin)	–	–	31.7%
CNT/MDA	4–5 October 2018	2,002	38.7% (Haddad)	–	–	–	–	–	–	45.2% (Bolsonaro)	–	16.1%
CNT/MDA	4–5 October 2018	2,002	–	46.1% (Gomes)	–	–	–	–	24.4% (Alckmin)	–	–	29.5%
CNT/MDA	4–5 October 2018	2,002	–	41.2% (Gomes)	–	–	–	–	–	41.9% (Bolsonaro)	–	16.9%
CNT/MDA	4–5 October 2018	2,002	–	–	–	–	–	–	33.5% (Alckmin)	43.3% (Bolsonaro)	–	23.2%
XP/Ipespe	3–4 October 2018	2,000	36% (Haddad)	–	–	–	–	–	40% (Alckmin)	–	–	24%
XP/Ipespe	3–4 October 2018	2,000	42% (Haddad)	–	–	–	–	–	–	43% (Bolsonaro)	–	15%
XP/Ipespe	3–4 October 2018	2,000	–	36% (Gomes)	–	–	–	–	33% (Alckmin)	–	–	31%
XP/Ipespe	3–4 October 2018	2,000	–	44% (Gomes)	–	–	–	–	–	39% (Bolsonaro)	–	18%
XP/Ipespe	3–4 October 2018	2,000	–	–	–	–	–	–	44% (Alckmin)	42% (Bolsonaro)	–	15%
RealTime Big Data	3–4 October 2018	10,000	40% (Haddad)	–	–	–	–	–	–	43% (Bolsonaro)	–	17%
RealTime Big Data	3–4 October 2018	10,000	–	48% (Gomes)	–	–	–	–	–	38% (Bolsonaro)	–	14%
RealTime Big Data	3–4 October 2018	10,000	–	–	–	37% (Silva)	–	–	–	40% (Bolsonaro)	–	23%
RealTime Big Data	3–4 October 2018	10,000	–	–	–	–	–	–	41% (Alckmin)	42% (Bolsonaro)	–	17%
DataPoder360	3–4 October 2018	4,000	28% (Haddad)	41% (Gomes)	–	–	–	–	–	–	–	30%
DataPoder360	3–4 October 2018	4,000	42% (Haddad)	–	–	–	–	–	–	45% (Bolsonaro)	–	13%
DataPoder360	3–4 October 2018	4,000	–	46% (Gomes)	–	–	–	–	–	41% (Bolsonaro)	–	13%
DataPoder360	3–4 October 2018	4,000	–	–	–	–	–	–	42% (Alckmin)	42% (Bolsonaro)	–	16%
Datafolha	3–4 October 2018	10,930	38% (Haddad)	–	–	–	–	–	42% (Alckmin)	–	–	20%
Datafolha	3–4 October 2018	10,930	43% (Haddad)		–	–	–	–	–	44% (Bolsonaro)	–	12%
Datafolha	3–4 October 2018	10,930	–	48% (Gomes)	–		–	–	–	42% (Bolsonaro)	–	11%
Datafolha	3–4 October 2018	10,930	–	–	–	–	–	–	43% (Alckmin)	42% (Bolsonaro)	–	15%
Paraná Pesquisas	2–4 October 2018	2,080	31.8% (Haddad)	40.7% (Gomes)	–	–	–	–	–	–	–	27.5%
Paraná Pesquisas	2–4 October 2018	2,080	35.2% (Haddad)	–	–	–	–	–	37.5% (Alckmin)	–	–	27.2%
Paraná Pesquisas	2–4 October 2018	2,080	38.1% (Haddad)	–	–	–	–	–	–	47.1% (Bolsonaro)	–	14.8%
Paraná Pesquisas	2–4 October 2018	2,080	–	42.5% (Gomes)	–	–	–	–	–	44.2% (Bolsonaro)	–	13.3%
Paraná Pesquisas	2–4 October 2018	2,080	–	–	–	–	–	–	35.9% (Alckmin)	44.5% (Bolsonaro)	–	19.5%
Movimento Parlamentarista Brasileiro	28 September –3 October 2018	2,500	41% (Haddad)	–	–	–	–	–	–	37% (Bolsonaro)	–	22%
Movimento Parlamentarista Brasileiro	28 September –3 October 2018	2,500	–	41% (Gomes)	–	–	–	–	–	35% (Bolsonaro)	–	24%
Movimento Parlamentarista Brasileiro	28 September –3 October 2018	2,500	–	–	–	35% (Silva)	–	–	–	37% (Bolsonaro)	–	28%
Movimento Parlamentarista Brasileiro	28 September –3 October 2018	2,500	–	–	–	–	–	–	36% (Alckmin)	36% (Bolsonaro)	–	28%
Datafolha	2 October 2018	3,240	32% (Haddad)	46% (Gomes)	–	–	–	–	–	–	–	22%
Datafolha	2 October 2018	3,240	36% (Haddad)	–	–	–	–	–	43% (Alckmin)	–	–	21%
Datafolha	2 October 2018	3,240	42% (Haddad)	–	–	–	–	–	–	44% (Bolsonaro)	–	14%
Datafolha	2 October 2018	3,240	–	42% (Gomes)	–	–	–	–	37% (Alckmin)	–	–	21%
Datafolha	2 October 2018	3,240	–	46% (Gomes)	–	–	–	–	–	42% (Bolsonaro)	–	12%
Datafolha	2 October 2018	3,240	–	–	–	–	–	–	43% (Alckmin)	41% (Bolsonaro)	–	16%
Ibope	1–2 October 2018	3,010	43% (Haddad)	–	–	–	–	–	–	41% (Bolsonaro)	–	15%
Ibope	1–2 October 2018	3,010	–	46% (Gomes)	–	–	–	–	–	39% (Bolsonaro)	–	16%
Ibope	1–2 October 2018	3,010	–	–	–	39% (Silva)	–	–	–	43% (Bolsonaro)	–	18%
Ibope	1–2 October 2018	3,010	–	–	–	–	–	–	41% (Alckmin)	40% (Bolsonaro)	–	19%
FSB Pesquisa	29–30 September 2018	2,000	42% (Haddad)	–	–	–	–	–	–	43% (Bolsonaro)	–	15%
FSB Pesquisa	29–30 September 2018	2,000	–	45% (Gomes)	–	–	–	–	–	41% (Bolsonaro)	–	14%
FSB Pesquisa	29–30 September 2018	2,000	–	–	–	39% (Silva)	–	–	–	44% (Bolsonaro)	–	18%
FSB Pesquisa	29–30 September 2018	2,000	–	–	–	–	–	–	42% (Alckmin)	41% (Bolsonaro)	–	17%
Ibope	29–30 September 2018	3,010	42% (Haddad)	–	–	–	–	–	–	42% (Bolsonaro)	–	17%
Ibope	29–30 September 2018	3,010	–	45% (Gomes)	–	–	–	–	–	39% (Bolsonaro)	–	16%
Ibope	29–30 September 2018	3,010	–	–	–	38% (Silva)	–	–	–	43% (Bolsonaro)	–	19%
Ibope	29–30 September 2018	3,010	–	–	–	–	–	–	42% (Alckmin)	39% (Bolsonaro)	–	20%
RealTime Big Data	28–29 September 2018	3,200	31% (Haddad)	40% (Gomes)	–	–	–	–	–	–	–	29%
RealTime Big Data	28–29 September 2018	3,200	35% (Haddad)	–	–	28% (Silva)	–	–	–	–	–	37%
RealTime Big Data	28–29 September 2018	3,200	37% (Haddad)	–	–	–	–	–	35% (Alckmin)	–	–	28%
RealTime Big Data	28–29 September 2018	3,200	45% (Haddad)	–	–	–	–	–	–	41% (Bolsonaro)	–	14%
RealTime Big Data	28–29 September 2018	3,200	–	40% (Gomes)	–	23% (Silva)	–	–	–	–	–	37%
RealTime Big Data	28–29 September 2018	3,200	–	47% (Gomes)	–	–	–	–	–	39% (Bolsonaro)	–	14%
RealTime Big Data	28–29 September 2018	3,200	–	–	–	28% (Silva)	–	–	29% (Alckmin)	–	–	43%
RealTime Big Data	28–29 September 2018	3,200	–	–	–	36% (Silva)	–	–	–	37% (Bolsonaro)	–	27%
RealTime Big Data	28–29 September 2018	3,200	–	–	–	–	–	–	39% (Alckmin)	40% (Bolsonaro)	–	21%
CNT/MDA	27–28 September 2018	2,000	33.9% (Haddad)	34.0% (Gomes)	–	–	–	–	–	–	–	32.1%
CNT/MDA	27–28 September 2018	2,000	39.8% (Haddad)	–	–	–	–	–	28.5% (Alckmin)	–	–	31.7%
CNT/MDA	27–28 September 2018	2,000	42.7% (Haddad)	–	–	–	–	–	–	37.3% (Bolsonaro)	–	20.0%
CNT/MDA	27–28 September 2018	2,000	–	41.5% (Gomes)	–	–	–	–	23.8% (Alckmin)	–	–	34.7%
CNT/MDA	27–28 September 2018	2,000	–	42.7% (Gomes)	–	–	–	–	–	35.3% (Bolsonaro)	–	22.0%
CNT/MDA	27–28 September 2018	2,000	–	–	–	–	–	–	37.0% (Alckmin)	33.6% (Bolsonaro)	–	29.4%
Datafolha	26–28 September 2018	9,000	35% (Haddad)	41% (Gomes)	–	–	–	–	–	–	–	24%
Datafolha	26–28 September 2018	9,000	39% (Haddad)	–	–	–	–	–	39% (Alckmin)	–	–	22%
Datafolha	26–28 September 2018	9,000	45% (Haddad)	–	–	–	–	–	–	39% (Bolsonaro)	–	15%
Datafolha	26–28 September 2018	9,000	–	42% (Gomes)	–	–	–	–	36% (Alckmin)	–	–	22%
Datafolha	26–28 September 2018	9,000	–	48% (Gomes)	–	–	–	–	–	38% (Bolsonaro)	–	14%
Datafolha	26–28 September 2018	9,000	–	–	–	–	–	–	45% (Alckmin)	38% (Bolsonaro)	–	18%
Genial Investimentos	25–26 September 2018	1,000	44% (Haddad)	–	–	–	–	–	–	36% (Bolsonaro)	–	19%
XP/Ipespe	24–26 de setembro de 2018	2,000	35% (Haddad)	–	–	–	–	–	38% (Alckmin)	–	–	27%
XP/Ipespe	24–26 de setembro de 2018	2,000	43% (Haddad)	–	–	–	–	–	–	39% (Bolsonaro)	–	18%
XP/Ipespe	24–26 de setembro de 2018	2,000	–	39% (Gomes)	–	–	–	–	35% (Alckmin)	–	–	26%
XP/Ipespe	24–26 de setembro de 2018	2,000	–	43% (Gomes)	–	–	–	–	–	35% (Bolsonaro)	–	21%
XP/Ipespe	24–26 de setembro de 2018	2,000	–	–	–	35% (Silva)	–	–	–	39% (Bolsonaro)	–	25%
XP/Ipespe	24–26 de setembro de 2018	2,000	–	–	–	–	–	–	41% (Alckmin)	38% (Bolsonaro)	–	22%
Paraná Pesquisas	23–25 September 2018	2,020	32.4% (Haddad)	38.2% (Gomes)	–	–	–	–	–	–	–	29.5%
Paraná Pesquisas	23–25 September 2018	2,020	36.3% (Haddad)	–	–	–	–	–	35.8% (Alckmin)	–	–	27.9%
Paraná Pesquisas	23–25 September 2018	2,020	39.4% (Haddad)	–	–	–	–	–	–	44.3% (Bolsonaro)	–	16.4%
Paraná Pesquisas	23–25 September 2018	2,020	–	43.2% (Gomes)	–	–	–	–	–	41.6% (Bolsonaro)	–	15.2%
Paraná Pesquisas	23–25 September 2018	2,020	–	–	–	–	–	–	38.2% (Alckmin)	42.1% (Bolsonaro)	–	19.7%
Ibope	22–24 September 2018	2,000	42% (Haddad)	–	–	–	–	–	–	38% (Bolsonaro)	–	20%
Ibope	22–24 September 2018	2,000	–	44% (Gomes)	–	–	–	–	–	35% (Bolsonaro)	–	20%
Ibope	22–24 September 2018	2,000	–	–	–	38% (Silva)	–	–	–	40% (Bolsonaro)	–	22%
Ibope	22–24 September 2018	2,000	–	–	–	–	–	–	40% (Alckmin)	36% (Bolsonaro)	–	23%
Sensus	21–24 September 2018	2,000	29.8% (Haddad)	25.6% (Gomes)	–	–	–	–	–	–	–	44.5%
Sensus	21–24 September 2018	2,000	37.3% (Haddad)	–	–	17.5% (Silva)	–	–	–	–	–	45.1%
Sensus	21–24 September 2018	2,000	35.1% (Haddad)	–	–	–	–	–	22.3% (Alckmin)	–	–	42.5%
Sensus	21–24 September 2018	2,000	36.3% (Haddad)	–	–	–	–	–	–	37.2% (Bolsonaro)	–	26.6%
Sensus	21–24 September 2018	2,000	–	33.5% (Gomes)	–	–	–	–	–	35.1% (Bolsonaro)	–	31.3%
Sensus	21–24 September 2018	2,000	–	–	–	26.5% (Silva)	–	–	–	37.4% (Bolsonaro)	–	36.1%
Sensus	21–24 September 2018	2,000	–	–	–	–	–	–	26.4% (Alckmin)	38.0% (Bolsonaro)	–	35.6%
Ibope	22–23 September 2018	2,506	43% (Haddad)	–	–	–	–	–	–	37% (Bolsonaro)	–	19%
Ibope	22–23 September 2018	2,506	–	46% (Gomes)	–	–	–	–	–	35% (Bolsonaro)	–	19%
Ibope	22–23 September 2018	2,506	–	–	–	39% (Silva)	–	–	–	39% (Bolsonaro)	–	23%
Ibope	22–23 September 2018	2,506	–	–	–	–	–	–	41% (Alckmin)	36% (Bolsonaro)	–	24%
FSB Pesquisa	22–23 de setembro de 2018	2,000	40% (Haddad)	–	–	–	–	–	–	44% (Bolsonaro)	–	15%
FSB Pesquisa	22–23 de setembro de 2018	2,000	–	43% (Gomes)	–	–	–	–	–	41% (Bolsonaro)	–	16%
FSB Pesquisa	22–23 de setembro de 2018	2,000	–	–	–	34% (Silva)	–	–	–	46% (Bolsonaro)	–	20%
FSB Pesquisa	22–23 de setembro de 2018	2,000	–	–	–	–	–	–	40% (Alckmin)	41% (Bolsonaro)	–	18%
DataPoder360	19–20 September 2018	4,000	43% (Haddad)	–	–	–	–	–	–	40% (Bolsonaro)	–	17%
DataPoder360	19–20 September 2018	4,000	–	42% (Gomes)	–	–	–	–	–	36% (Bolsonaro)	–	22%
DataPoder360	19–20 September 2018	4,000	–	–	–	37% (Silva)	–	–	–	39% (Bolsonaro)	–	24%
DataPoder360	19–20 September 2018	4,000	–	–	–	–	–	–	36% (Alckmin)	37% (Bolsonaro)	–	27%
Datafolha	18–19 September 2018	8,601	31% (Haddad)	42% (Gomes)	–	–	–	–	–	–	–	28%
Datafolha	18–19 September 2018	8,601	37% (Haddad)	–	–	37% (Silva)	–	–	–	–	–	26%
Datafolha	18–19 September 2018	8,601	35% (Haddad)	–	–	–	–	–	39% (Alckmin)	–	–	27%
Datafolha	18–19 September 2018	8,601	41% (Haddad)	–	–	–	–	–	–	41% (Bolsonaro)	–	17%
Datafolha	18–19 September 2018	8,601	–	45% (Gomes)	–	31% (Silva)	–	–	–	–	–	24%
Datafolha	18–19 September 2018	8,601	–	41% (Gomes)	–	–	–	–	34% (Alckmin)	–	–	24%
Datafolha	18–19 September 2018	8,601	–	45% (Gomes)	–	–	–	–	–	39% (Bolsonaro)	–	16%
Datafolha	18–19 September 2018	8,601	–	–	–	36% (Silva)	–	–	39% (Alckmin)	–	–	25%
Datafolha	18–19 September 2018	8,601	–	–	–	41% (Silva)	–	–	–	42% (Bolsonaro)	–	18%
Datafolha	18–19 September 2018	8,601	–	–	–	–	–	–	40% (Alckmin)	39% (Bolsonaro)	–	21%
Genial Investimentos	17–19 September 2018	1,000	33% (Haddad)	32% (Gomes)	–	–	–	–	–	–	–	35%
Genial Investimentos	17–19 September 2018	1,000	34% (Haddad)	–	–	–	–	–	36% (Alckmin)	–	–	31%
Genial Investimentos	17–19 September 2018	1,000	40% (Haddad)	–	–	–	–	–	–	42% (Bolsonaro)	–	18%
Genial Investimentos	17–19 September 2018	1,000	–	34% (Gomes)	–	–	–	–	32% (Alckmin)	–	–	34%
Genial Investimentos	17–19 September 2018	1,000	–	38% (Gomes)	–	–	–	–	–	40% (Bolsonaro)	–	22%
Genial Investimentos	17–19 September 2018	1,000	–	–	–	–	–	–	35% (Alckmin)	38% (Bolsonaro)	–	27%
XP/Ipespe	17–19 September 201	2,000	31% (Haddad)	–	–	–	–	–	38% (Alckmin)	–	–	31%
XP/Ipespe	17–19 September 201	2,000	38% (Haddad)	–	–	–	–	–	–	41% (Bolsonaro)	–	21%
XP/Ipespe	17–19 September 201	2,000	–	37% (Gomes)	–	–	–	–	35% (Alckmin)	–	–	29%
XP/Ipespe	17–19 September 201	2,000	–	40% (Gomes)	–	–	–	–	–	35% (Bolsonaro)	–	26%
XP/Ipespe	17–19 September 201	2,000	–	–	–	35% (Silva)	–	–	–	40% (Bolsonaro)	–	25%
XP/Ipespe	17–19 September 201	2,000	–	–	–	–	–	–	39% (Alckmin)	39% (Bolsonaro)	–	22%
Ibope	16–18 September 2018	2,506	40% (Haddad)	–	–	–	–	–	–	40% (Bolsonaro)	–	20%
Ibope	16–18 September 2018	2,506	–	40% (Gomes)	–	–	–	–	–	39% (Bolsonaro)	–	21%
Ibope	16–18 September 2018	2,506	–	–	–	36% (Silva)	–	–	–	41% (Bolsonaro)	–	23%
Ibope	16–18 September 2018	2,506	–	–	–	–	–	–	38% (Alckmin)	38% (Bolsonaro)	–	24%
FSB Pesquisa	15–16 September 2018	2,000	38% (Haddad)	–	–	–	–	–	–	46% (Bolsonaro)	–	16%
FSB Pesquisa	15–16 September 2018	2,000	–	42% (Gomes)	–	–	–	–	–	42% (Bolsonaro)	–	16%
FSB Pesquisa	15–16 September 2018	2,000	–	–	–	33% (Silva)	–	–	–	48% (Bolsonaro)	–	20%
FSB Pesquisa	15–16 September 2018	2,000	–	–	–	–	–	–	36% (Alckmin)	43% (Bolsonaro)	–	21%
CNT/MDA	12–15 September 2018	2,002	26.1% (Haddad)	38.1% (Gomes)	–	–	–	–	–	–	–	35.8%
CNT/MDA	12–15 September 2018	2,002	35.7% (Haddad)	–	–	23.3% (Silva)	–	–	–	–	–	41.0%
CNT/MDA	12–15 September 2018	2,002	35.5% (Haddad)	–	–	–	21.4% (Meirelles)	–	–	–	–	43.1%
CNT/MDA	12–15 September 2018	2,002	33.1% (Haddad)	–	–	–	–	–	26.8% (Alckmin)	–	–	40.1%
CNT/MDA	12–15 September 2018	2,002	35.7% (Haddad)	–	–	–	–	–	–	39.0% (Bolsonaro)	–	25.3%
CNT/MDA	12–15 September 2018	2,002	–	43.8% (Gomes)	–	17.1% (Silva)	–	–	–	–	–	39.1%
CNT/MDA	12–15 September 2018	2,002	–	43.5% (Gomes)	–	–	14.8% (Meirelles)	–	–	–	–	41.7%
CNT/MDA	12–15 September 2018	2,002	–	39.6% (Gomes)	–	–	–	–	20.3% (Alckmin)	–	–	40.1%
CNT/MDA	12–15 September 2018	2,002	–	37.8% (Gomes)	–	–	–	–	–	36.1% (Bolsonaro)	–	26.1%
CNT/MDA	12–15 September 2018	2,002	–	–	–	27.9% (Silva)	23.2% (Meirelles)	–	–	–	–	48.9%
CNT/MDA	12–15 September 2018	2,002	–	–	–	25.3% (Silva)	–	–	28.4% (Alckmin)	–	–	46.3%
CNT/MDA	12–15 September 2018	2,002	–	–	–	28.2% (Silva)	–	–	–	39.4% (Bolsonaro)	–	32.4%
CNT/MDA	12–15 September 2018	2,002	–	–	–	–	19.1% (Meirelles)	–	28.9% (Alckmin)	–	–	52.0%
CNT/MDA	12–15 September 2018	2,002	–	–	–	–	25.7% (Meirelles)	–	–	38.6% (Bolsonaro)	–	35.7%
CNT/MDA	12–15 September 2018	2,002	–	–	–	–	–	–	27.7% (Alckmin)	38.2% (Bolsonaro)	–	34.1%
Datafolha	13–14 September 2018	2,820	27% (Haddad)	45% (Gomes)	–	–	–	–	–	–	–	28%
Datafolha	13–14 September 2018	2,820	34% (Haddad)	–	–	39% (Silva)	–	–	–	–	–	27%
Datafolha	13–14 September 2018	2,820	32% (Haddad)	–	–	–	–	–	40% (Alckmin)	–	–	28%
Datafolha	13–14 September 2018	2,820	40% (Haddad)	–	–	–	–	–	–	41% (Bolsonaro)	–	19%
Datafolha	13–14 September 2018	2,820	–	44% (Gomes)	–	32% (Silva)	–	–	–	–	–	24%
Datafolha	13–14 September 2018	2,820	–	40% (Gomes)	–	–	–	–	34% (Alckmin)	–	–	26%
Datafolha	13–14 September 2018	2,820	–	45% (Gomes)	–	–	–	–	–	38% (Bolsonaro)	–	17%
Datafolha	13–14 September 2018	2,820	–	–	–	36% (Silva)	–	–	39% (Alckmin)	–	–	25%
Datafolha	13–14 September 2018	2,820	–	–	–	43% (Silva)	–	–	–	39% (Bolsonaro)	–	18%
Datafolha	13–14 September 2018	2,820	–	–	–	–	–	–	41% (Alckmin)	37% (Bolsonaro)	–	21%
XP/Ipespe	10–12 September 2018	2,000	28% (Haddad)	–	–	–	–	–	38% (Alckmin)	–	–	35%
XP/Ipespe	10–12 September 2018	2,000	38% (Haddad)	–	–	–	–	–	–	40% (Bolsonaro)	–	22%
XP/Ipespe	10–12 September 2018	2,000	–	35% (Gomes)	–	–	–	–	35% (Alckmin)	–	–	31%
XP/Ipespe	10–12 September 2018	2,000	–	40% (Gomes)	–	–	–	–	–	35% (Bolsonaro)	–	26%
XP/Ipespe	10–12 September 2018	2,000	–	–	–	37% (Silva)	–	–	–	36% (Bolsonaro)	–	27%
XP/Ipespe	10–12 September 2018	2,000	–	–	–	–	–	–	37% (Alckmin)	36% (Bolsonaro)	–	26%
Vox Populi	7–11 September 2018	2,000	32% (Haddad)	–	–	16% (Silva)	–	–	–	–	–	51%
Vox Populi	7–11 September 2018	2,000	33% (Haddad)	–	–	–	–	–	15% (Alckmin)	–	–	52%
Vox Populi	7–11 September 2018	2,000	37% (Haddad, supported by Lula)	–	–	–	–	–	13% (Alckmin)	–	–	50%
Vox Populi	7–11 September 2018	2,000	34% (Haddad)	–	–	–	–	–	–	24% (Bolsonaro)	–	42%
Vox Populi	7–11 September 2018	2,000	36% (Haddad, supported by Lula)	–	–	–	–	–	–	24% (Bolsonaro)	–	40%
Vox Populi	7–11 September 2018	2,000	–	33% (Gomes)	–	15% (Silva)	–	–	–	–	–	52%
Vox Populi	7–11 September 2018	2,000	–	34% (Gomes)	–	–	–	–	11% (Alckmin)	–	–	55%
Vox Populi	7–11 September 2018	2,000	–	32% (Gomes)	–	–	–	–	–	22% (Bolsonaro)	–	46%
Vox Populi	7–11 September 2018	2,000	–	–	–	24% (Silva)	–	–	16% (Alckmin)	–	–	61%
Vox Populi	7–11 September 2018	2,000	–	–	–	26% (Silva)	–	–	–	24% (Bolsonaro)	–	49%
Vox Populi	7–11 September 2018	2,000	–	–	–	–	–	–	18% (Alckmin)	25% (Bolsonaro)	–	56%
Datafolha	10 September 2018	2,804	29% (Haddad)	–	–	–	–	–	43% (Alckmin)	–	–	28%
Datafolha	10 September 2018	2,804	39% (Haddad)	–	–	–	–	–	–	38% (Bolsonaro)	–	23%
Datafolha	10 September 2018	2,804	–	39% (Gomes)	–	–	–	–	35% (Alckmin)	–	–	26%
Datafolha	10 September 2018	2,804	–	45% (Gomes)	–	–	–	–	–	35% (Bolsonaro)	–	20%
Datafolha	10 September 2018	2,804	–	–	–	38% (Silva)	–	–	37% (Alckmin)	–	–	25%
Datafolha	10 September 2018	2,804	–	–	–	43% (Silva)	–	–	–	37% (Bolsonaro)	–	20%
Datafolha	10 September 2018	2,804	–	–	–	–	–	–	43% (Alckmin)	34% (Bolsonaro)	–	23%
Datafolha	10 September 2018	2,804	–	41% (Gomes)	–	35% (Silva)	–	–	–	–	–	24%
Datafolha	10 September 2018	2,804	31% (Haddad)	–	–	42% (Silva)	–	–	–	–	–	28%
Ibope	8-10 September 2018	2,002	36% (Haddad)	–	–	–	–	–	–	40% (Bolsonaro)	–	24%
Ibope	8-10 September 2018	2,002	–	40% (Gomes)	–	–	–	–	–	37% (Bolsonaro)	–	22%
Ibope	8-10 September 2018	2,002	–	–	–	38% (Silva)	–	–	–	38% (Bolsonaro)	–	24%
Ibope	8-10 September 2018	2,002	–	–	–	–	–	–	38% (Alckmin)	37% (Bolsonaro)	–	25%
RealTime Big Data	7-9 September 2018	3,200	33% (Haddad)	–	–	–	–	–	–	36% (Bolsonaro)	–	
RealTime Big Data	7-9 September 2018	3,200	–	37% (Gomes)	–	–	–	–	–	34% (Bolsonaro)	–	
RealTime Big Data	7-9 September 2018	3,200	–	–	–	46% (Silva)	–	–	–	34% (Bolsonaro)	–	
RealTime Big Data	7-9 September 2018	3,200	–	–	–	–	–	–	38% (Alckmin)	35% (Bolsonaro)	–	
On 6 September 2018, Jair Bolsonaro was stabbed while he was campaigning in Juiz de Fora, Minas Gerais.
Ibope	1–3 September 2018	2,002	–	44% (Gomes)	–	–	–	–	–	33% (Bolsonaro)	–	23%
Ibope	1–3 September 2018	2,002	–	–	–	–	–	–	41% (Alckmin)	32% (Bolsonaro)	–	27%
Ibope	1–3 September 2018	2,002	–	–	–	43% (Silva)	–	–	–	33% (Bolsonaro)	–	23%
Ibope	1–3 September 2018	2,002	36% (Haddad)	–	–	–	–	–	–	37% (Bolsonaro)	–	27%
On 31 August 2018, the Superior Electoral Court votes to officially reject Luiz Inácio Lula da Silva's candidacy.
XP/Ipespe	27–29 August 2018	1,000	24% (Haddad)	–	–	–	–	–	36% (Alckmin)	–	–	40%
XP/Ipespe	27–29 August 2018	1,000	34% (Haddad)	–	–	–	–	–	–	37% (Bolsonaro)	–	29%
XP/Ipespe	27–29 August 2018	1,000	45% (Lula)	–	–	–	–	–	–	34% (Bolsonaro)	–	21%
XP/Ipespe	27–29 August 2018	1,000	–	29% (Gomes)	–	–	–	–	34% (Alckmin)	–	–	37%
XP/Ipespe	27–29 August 2018	1,000	–	34% (Gomes)	–	–	–	–	–	32% (Bolsonaro)	–	34%
XP/Ipespe	27–29 August 2018	1,000	–	–	–	37% (Silva)	–	–	–	34% (Bolsonaro)	–	29%
XP/Ipespe	27–29 August 2018	1,000	–	–	–	–	–	–	35% (Alckmin)	35% (Bolsonaro)	–	30%
XP/Ipespe	20–22 August 2018	1,000	25% (Haddad)	–	–	–	–	–	36% (Alckmin)	–	–	41%
XP/Ipespe	20–22 August 2018	1,000	32% (Haddad)	–	–	–	–	–	–	38% (Bolsonaro)	–	30%
XP/Ipespe	20–22 August 2018	1,000	45% (Lula)	–	–	–	–	–	–	33% (Bolsonaro)	–	22%
XP/Ipespe	20–22 August 2018	1,000	–	28% (Gomes)	–	–	–	–	33% (Alckmin)	–	–	39%
XP/Ipespe	20–22 August 2018	1,000	–	32% (Gomes)	–	–	–	–	–	32% (Bolsonaro)	–	36%
XP/Ipespe	20–22 August 2018	1,000	–	–	–	37% (Silva)	–	–	–	33% (Bolsonaro)	–	30%
XP/Ipespe	20–22 August 2018	1,000	–	–	–	–	–	–	33% (Alckmin)	34% (Bolsonaro)	–	33%
Globo/Datafolha	20–21 August 2018	8,433	25% (Haddad)	–	–	–	–	–	36% (Alckmin)	–	–	41%
Globo/Datafolha	20–21 August 2018	8,433	29% (Haddad)	–	–	–	–	–	–	38% (Bolsonaro)	–	33%
Globo/Datafolha	20–21 August 2018	8,433	51% (Lula)	–	–	29% (Silva)	–	–	–	–	–	20%
Globo/Datafolha	20–21 August 2018	8,433	53% (Lula)	–	–	–	–	–	29% (Alckmin)	–	–	18%
Globo/Datafolha	20–21 August 2018	8,433	52% (Lula)	–	–	–	–	–	–	32% (Bolsonaro)	–	16%
Globo/Datafolha	20–21 August 2018	8,433	–	31% (Gomes)	–	–	–	–	37% (Alckmin)	–	–	32%
Globo/Datafolha	20–21 August 2018	8,433	–	38% (Gomes)	–	–	–	–	–	35% (Bolsonaro)	–	27%
Globo/Datafolha	20–21 August 2018	8,433	–	–	–	41% (Silva)	–	–	33% (Alckmin)	–	–	26%
Globo/Datafolha	20–21 August 2018	8,433	–	–	–	45% (Silva)	–	–	–	34% (Bolsonaro)	–	21%
Globo/Datafolha	20–21 August 2018	8,433	–	–	–	–	–	–	38% (Alckmin)	33% (Bolsonaro)	–	29%
CNT/MDA	15–18 August 2018	2,002	49.4% (Lula)	18.5% (Gomes)	–	–	–	–	–	–	–	32.1%
CNT/MDA	15–18 August 2018	2,002	49.8% (Lula)	–	–	18.8% (Silva)	–	–	–	–	–	31.4%
CNT/MDA	15–18 August 2018	2,002	49.5% (Lula)	–	–	–	–	–	20.4% (Alckmin)	–	–	30.1%
CNT/MDA	15–18 August 2018	2,002	50.1% (Lula)	–	–	–	–	–	–	26.4% (Bolsonaro)	–	23.5%
CNT/MDA	15–18 August 2018	2,002	–	26.1% (Gomes)	–	25.2% (Silva)	–	–	–	–	–	48.7%
CNT/MDA	15–18 August 2018	2,002	–	25.3% (Gomes)	–	–	–	–	22.0% (Alckmin)	–	–	52.7%
CNT/MDA	15–18 August 2018	2,002	–	28.2% (Gomes)	–	–	–	–	–	29.4% (Bolsonaro)	–	42.4%
CNT/MDA	15–18 August 2018	2,002	–	–	–	26.7% (Silva)	–	–	23.9% (Alckmin)	–	–	49.4%
CNT/MDA	15–18 August 2018	2,002	–	–	–	29.1% (Silva)	–	–	–	29.3% (Bolsonaro)	–	41.6%
CNT/MDA	15–18 August 2018	2,002	–	–	–	–	–	–	26.4% (Alckmin)	29.4% (Bolsonaro)	–	44.2%
Ipespe	13–15 August 2018	1,000	25% (Haddad)	–	–	–	–	–	35% (Alckmin)	–	–	41%
Ipespe	13–15 August 2018	1,000	32% (Haddad)	–	–	–	–	–	–	37% (Bolsonaro)	–	31%
Ipespe	13–15 August 2018	1,000	43% (Lula)	–	–	–	–	–	–	34% (Bolsonaro)	–	24%
Ipespe	13–15 August 2018	1,000	–	27% (Gomes)	–	–	–	–	32% (Alckmin)	–	–	42%
Ipespe	13–15 August 2018	1,000	–	30% (Gomes)	–	–	–	–	–	33% (Bolsonaro)	–	36%
Ipespe	13–15 August 2018	1,000	–	–	–	36% (Silva)	–	–	–	34% (Bolsonaro)	–	29%
Ipespe	13–15 August 2018	1,000	–	–	–	–	–	–	32% (Alckmin)	34% (Bolsonaro)	–	29%
Ipespe	6–8 August 2018	1,000	25% (Haddad)	–	–	–	–	–	36% (Alckmin)	–	–	41%
Ipespe	6–8 August 2018	1,000	29% (Haddad)	–	–	–	–	–	–	37% (Bolsonaro)	–	34%
Ipespe	6–8 August 2018	1,000	41% (Lula)	–	–	–	–	–	–	32% (Bolsonaro)	–	26%
Ipespe	6–8 August 2018	1,000	–	28% (Gomes)	–	–	–	–	33% (Alckmin)	–	–	40%
Ipespe	6–8 August 2018	1,000	–	30% (Gomes)	–	–	–	–	–	32% (Bolsonaro)	–	37%
Ipespe	6–8 August 2018	1,000	–	–	–	38% (Silva)	–	–	–	32% (Bolsonaro)	–	30%
Ipespe	6–8 August 2018	1,000	–	–	–	–	–	–	33% (Alckmin)	33% (Bolsonaro)	–	33%
Ipespe	30 July–1 August 2018	1,000	23% (Haddad)	–	–	–	–	–	34% (Alckmin)	–	–	43%
Ipespe	30 July–1 August 2018	1,000	28% (Haddad)	–	–	–	–	–	–	37% (Bolsonaro)	–	35%
Ipespe	30 July–1 August 2018	1,000	41% (Lula)	–	–	–	–	–	–	33% (Bolsonaro)	–	26%
Ipespe	30 July–1 August 2018	1,000	–	29% (Gomes)	–	–	–	–	32% (Alckmin)	–	–	39%
Ipespe	30 July–1 August 2018	1,000	–	32% (Gomes)	–	–	–	–	–	33% (Bolsonaro)	–	35%
Ipespe	30 July–1 August 2018	1,000	–	–	–	37% (Silva)	–	–	–	32% (Bolsonaro)	–	31%
Ipespe	30 July–1 August 2018	1,000	–	–	–	–	–	–	33% (Alckmin)	34% (Bolsonaro)	–	33%
Ipespe	23–25 July 2018	1,000	22% (Haddad)	–	–	–	–	–	36% (Alckmin)	–	–	43%
Ipespe	23–25 July 2018	1,000	27% (Haddad)	–	–	–	–	–	–	38% (Bolsonaro)	–	36%
Ipespe	23–25 July 2018	1,000	40% (Lula)	–	–	–	–	–	–	34% (Bolsonaro)	–	26%
Ipespe	23–25 July 2018	1,000	–	29% (Gomes)	–	–	–	–	34% (Alckmin)	–	–	37%
Ipespe	23–25 July 2018	1,000	–	32% (Gomes)	–	–	–	–	–	34% (Bolsonaro)	–	34%
Ipespe	23–25 July 2018	1,000	–	–	–	36% (Silva)	–	–	–	34% (Bolsonaro)	–	30%
Ipespe	23–25 July 2018	1,000	–	–	–	–	–	–	34% (Alckmin)	35% (Bolsonaro)	–	32%
Ideia Big Data	20–23 July 2018	2,036	10% (Haddad)	–	–	32% (Silva)	–	–	–	–	–	58%
Ideia Big Data	20–23 July 2018	2,036	16% (Haddad)	–	–	–	–	–	20% (Alckmin)	–	–	64%
Ideia Big Data	20–23 July 2018	2,036	15% (Haddad)	–	–	–	–	–	–	31% (Bolsonaro)	–	54%
Ideia Big Data	20–23 July 2018	2,036	31% (Lula)	–	–	24% (Silva)	–	–	–	–	–	45%
Ideia Big Data	20–23 July 2018	2,036	33% (Lula)	–	–	–	–	–	18% (Alckmin)	–	–	49%
Ideia Big Data	20–23 July 2018	2,036	37% (Lula)	–	–	–	–	–	–	30% (Bolsonaro)	–	33%
Ideia Big Data	20–23 July 2018	2,036	–	22% (Gomes)	–	–	–	16% (Dias)	–	–	–	61%
Ideia Big Data	20–23 July 2018	2,036	–	25% (Gomes)	–	–	–	–	25% (Alckmin)	–	–	50%
Ideia Big Data	20–23 July 2018	2,036	–	25% (Gomes)	–	–	–	–	–	27% (Bolsonaro)	–	48%
Ideia Big Data	20–23 July 2018	2,036	–	–	–	33% (Silva)	–	–	20% (Alckmin)	–	–	47%
Ideia Big Data	20–23 July 2018	2,036	–	–	–	30% (Silva)	–	–	–	28% (Bolsonaro)	–	42%
Ideia Big Data	20–23 July 2018	2,036	–	–	–	–	–	14% (Dias)	–	31% (Bolsonaro)	–	55%
Ideia Big Data	20–23 July 2018	2,036	–	–	–	–	–	–	26% (Alckmin)	25% (Bolsonaro)	–	49%
Vox Populi	18–20 July 2018	2,000	50% (Lula)	11% (Gomes)	–	–	–	–	–	–	–	40%
Vox Populi	18–20 July 2018	2,000	50% (Lula)	–	–	12% (Silva)	–	–	–	–	–	38%
Vox Populi	18–20 July 2018	2,000	52% (Lula)	–	–	–	–	–	10% (Alckmin)	–	–	38%
Vox Populi	18–20 July 2018	2,000	50% (Lula)	–	–	–	–	–	–	16% (Bolsonaro)	–	33%
Ipespe	16–18 July 2018	1,000	20% (Haddad)	–	–	–	–	–	29% (Alckmin)	–	–	42%
Ipespe	16–18 July 2018	1,000	28% (Haddad)	–	–	–	–	–	–	38% (Bolsonaro)	–	35%
Ipespe	16–18 July 2018	1,000	41% (Lula)	–	–	–	–	–	–	34% (Bolsonaro)	–	25%
Ipespe	16–18 July 2018	1,000	–	31% (Gomes)	–	–	–	–	32% (Alckmin)	–	–	37%
Ipespe	16–18 July 2018	1,000	–	33% (Gomes)	–	–	–	–	–	34% (Bolsonaro)	–	33%
Ipespe	16–18 July 2018	1,000	–	–	–	37% (Silva)	–	–	–	34% (Bolsonaro)	–	29%
Ipespe	16–18 July 2018	1,000	–	–	–	–	–	–	33% (Alckmin)	35% (Bolsonaro)	–	32%
Ipespe	9–11 July 2018	1,000	20% (Haddad)	–	–	–	–	–	30% (Alckmin)	–	–	44%
Ipespe	9–11 July 2018	1,000	40% (Lula)	–	–	–	–	–	–	33% (Bolsonaro)	–	27%
Ipespe	9–11 July 2018	1,000	–	30% (Gomes)	–	–	–	–	32% (Alckmin)	–	–	38%
Ipespe	9–11 July 2018	1,000	–	31% (Gomes)	–	–	–	–	–	33% (Bolsonaro)	–	36%
Ipespe	9–11 July 2018	1,000	–	–	–	37% (Silva)	–	–	–	33% (Bolsonaro)	–	29%
Ipespe	9–11 July 2018	1,000	–	–	–	–	–	–	32% (Alckmin)	34% (Bolsonaro)	–	35%
Ipespe	2–4 July 2018	1,000	20% (Haddad)	–	–	–	–	–	28% (Alckmin)	–	–	45%
Ipespe	2–4 July 2018	1,000	39% (Lula)	–	–	–	–	–	–	33% (Bolsonaro)	–	29%
Ipespe	2–4 July 2018	1,000	–	31% (Gomes)	–	–	–	–	33% (Alckmin)	–	–	37%
Ipespe	2–4 July 2018	1,000	–	31% (Gomes)	–	–	–	–	–	34% (Bolsonaro)	–	34%
Ipespe	2–4 July 2018	1,000	–	–	–	36% (Silva)	–	–	–	33% (Bolsonaro)	–	31%
Ipespe	2–4 July 2018	1,000	–	–	–	–	–	–	32% (Alckmin)	34% (Bolsonaro)	–	35%
DataPoder360	25–29 June 2018	5,500	23% (Haddad)	–	–	–	–	–	–	36% (Bolsonaro)	–	41%
DataPoder360	25–29 June 2018	5,500	–	26% (Gomes)	–	–	–	–	–	36% (Bolsonaro)	–	38%
DataPoder360	25–29 June 2018	5,500	–	–	–	31% (Silva)	–	–	–	36% (Bolsonaro)	–	34%
DataPoder360	25–29 June 2018	5,500	–	–	–	–	–	–	25% (Alckmin)	35% (Bolsonaro)	–	40%
Ipespe	25–27 June 2018	1,000	19% (Haddad)	–	–	–	–	–	29% (Alckmin)	–	–	45%
Ipespe	25–27 June 2018	1,000	40% (Lula)	–	–	–	–	–	–	33% (Bolsonaro)	–	27%
Ipespe	25–27 June 2018	1,000	–	32% (Gomes)	–	–	–	–	32% (Alckmin)	–	–	35%
Ipespe	25–27 June 2018	1,000	–	32% (Gomes)	–	–	–	–	–	33% (Bolsonaro)	–	35%
Ipespe	25–27 June 2018	1,000	–	–	–	35% (Silva)	–	–	–	32% (Bolsonaro)	–	33%
Ipespe	25–27 June 2018	1,000	–	–	–	–	–	–	32% (Alckmin)	33% (Bolsonaro)	–	36%
Ipespe	18–20 June 2018	1,000	19% (Haddad)	–	–	–	–	–	28% (Alckmin)	–	–	48%
Ipespe	18–20 June 2018	1,000	41% (Lula)	–	–	–	–	–	–	33% (Bolsonaro)	–	26%
Ipespe	18–20 June 2018	1,000	–	30% (Gomes)	–	–	–	–	32% (Alckmin)	–	–	38%
Ipespe	18–20 June 2018	1,000	–	32% (Gomes)	–	–	–	–	–	33% (Bolsonaro)	–	35%
Ipespe	18–20 June 2018	1,000	–	–	–	36% (Silva)	–	–	–	32% (Bolsonaro)	–	31%
Ipespe	18–20 June 2018	1,000	–	–	–	–	–	–	31% (Alckmin)	32% (Bolsonaro)	–	37%
Ipespe	11–13 June 2018	1,000	19% (Haddad)	–	–	–	–	–	29% (Alckmin)	–	–	48%
Ipespe	11–13 June 2018	1,000	42% (Lula)	–	–	–	–	–	–	34% (Bolsonaro)	–	24%
Ipespe	11–13 June 2018	1,000	–	30% (Gomes)	–	–	–	–	31% (Alckmin)	–	–	39%
Ipespe	11–13 June 2018	1,000	–	33% (Gomes)	–	–	–	–	–	34% (Bolsonaro)	–	34%
Ipespe	11–13 June 2018	1,000	–	–	–	38% (Silva)	–	–	–	34% (Bolsonaro)	–	28%
Ipespe	11–13 June 2018	1,000	–	–	–	–	–	–	31% (Alckmin)	33% (Bolsonaro)	–	35%
Datafolha	6–7 June 2018	2,824	19% (Haddad)	38% (Gomes)	–	–	–	–	–	–	–	42%
Datafolha	6–7 June 2018	2,824	20% (Haddad)	–	–	–	–	–	36% (Alckmin)	–	–	44%
Datafolha	6–7 June 2018	2,824	27% (Haddad)	–	–	–	–	–	–	36% (Bolsonaro)	–	37%
Datafolha	6–7 June 2018	2,824	46% (Lula)	–	–	31% (Silva)	–	–	–	–	–	22%
Datafolha	6–7 June 2018	2,824	49% (Lula)	–	–	–	–	–	27% (Alckmin)	–	–	23%
Datafolha	6–7 June 2018	2,824	49% (Lula)	–	–	–	–	–	–	32% (Bolsonaro)	–	18%
Datafolha	6–7 June 2018	2,824	–	29% (Gomes)	–	41% (Silva)	–	–	–	–	–	30%
Datafolha	6–7 June 2018	2,824	–	32% (Gomes)	–	–	–	–	31% (Alckmin)	–	–	37%
Datafolha	6–7 June 2018	2,824	–	36% (Gomes)	–	–	–	–	–	34% (Bolsonaro)	–	31%
Datafolha	6–7 June 2018	2,824	–	–	–	42% (Silva)	–	–	27% (Alckmin)	–	–	31%
Datafolha	6–7 June 2018	2,824	–	–	–	42% (Silva)	–	–	–	32% (Bolsonaro)	–	26%
Datafolha	6–7 June 2018	2,824	–	–	–	–	–	–	33% (Alckmin)	33% (Bolsonaro)	–	35%
Ipespe	4–6 June 2018	1,000	20% (Haddad)	–	–	–	–	–	30% (Alckmin)	–	–	48%
Ipespe	4–6 June 2018	1,000	40% (Lula)	–	–	–	–	–	–	35% (Bolsonaro)	–	26%
Ipespe	4–6 June 2018	1,000	–	32% (Gomes)	–	–	–	–	29% (Alckmin)	–	–	40%
Ipespe	4–6 June 2018	1,000	–	33% (Gomes)	–	–	–	–	–	35% (Bolsonaro)	–	31%
Ipespe	4–6 June 2018	1,000	–	–	–	36% (Silva)	–	–	–	35% (Bolsonaro)	–	29%
Ipespe	4–6 June 2018	1,000	–	–	–	–	–	–	29% (Alckmin)	34% (Bolsonaro)	–	37%
DataPoder360	25–31 May 2018	10,500	20% (Haddad)	–	–	–	–	–	–	35% (Bolsonaro)	–	45%
DataPoder360	25–31 May 2018	10,500	–	21% (Gomes)	–	–	–	–	–	34% (Bolsonaro)	–	45%
DataPoder360	25–31 May 2018	10,500	–	–	–	25% (Silva)	–	–	–	35% (Bolsonaro)	–	41%
DataPoder360	25–31 May 2018	10,500	–	–	–	–	–	–	20% (Alckmin)	31% (Bolsonaro)	–	48%
Ipespe	21–23 May 2018	1,000	25% (Haddad)	–	–	–	–	–	28% (Alckmin)	–	–	55%
Ipespe	21–23 May 2018	1,000	36% (Lula)	–	–	–	–	–	–	38% (Bolsonaro)	–	26%
Ipespe	21–23 May 2018	1,000	–	27% (Gomes)	–	–	–	–	30% (Alckmin)	–	–	43%
Ipespe	21–23 May 2018	1,000	–	29% (Gomes)	–	–	–	–	–	38% (Bolsonaro)	–	32%
Ipespe	21–23 May 2018	1,000	–	–	–	31% (Silva)	–	–	–	37% (Bolsonaro)	–	32%
Ipespe	21–23 May 2018	1,000	–	–	–	–	–	–	28% (Alckmin)	35% (Bolsonaro)	–	37%
Vox Populi	19–23 May 2018	2,000	45% (Lula)	–	–	14% (Silva)	–	–	–	–	–	40%
Vox Populi	19–23 May 2018	2,000	47% (Lula)	–	–	–	–	–	11% (Alckmin)	–	–	42%
Vox Populi	19–23 May 2018	2,000	47% (Lula)	–	–	–	–	–	–	16% (Bolsonaro)	–	37%
Ipespe	15–18 May 2018	1,000	15% (Haddad)	–	–	–	–	–	31% (Alckmin)	–	–	53%
Ipespe	15–18 May 2018	1,000	35% (Lula)	–	–	–	–	–	–	37% (Bolsonaro)	–	28%
Ipespe	15–18 May 2018	1,000	–	27% (Gomes)	–	–	–	–	32% (Alckmin)	–	–	41%
Ipespe	15–18 May 2018	1,000	–	29% (Gomes)	–	–	–	–	–	36% (Bolsonaro)	–	36%
Ipespe	15–18 May 2018	1,000	–	–	–	31% (Silva)	–	–	–	35% (Bolsonaro)	–	34%
Ipespe	15–18 May 2018	1,000	–	–	–	–	–	–	29% (Alckmin)	33% (Bolsonaro)	–	38%
MDA	9–12 May 2018	2,002	10.0% (Haddad)	–	–	–	–	–	25.0% (Alckmin)	–	–	65.0%
MDA	9–12 May 2018	2,002	14.0% (Haddad)	–	–	–	–	–	–	31.5% (Bolsonaro)	–	54.5%
MDA	9–12 May 2018	2,002	44.4% (Lula)	–	–	21.0% (Silva)	–	–	–	–	–	34.6%
MDA	9–12 May 2018	2,002	47.1% (Lula)	–	–	–	13.3% (Meirelles)	–	–	–	–	39.6%
MDA	9–12 May 2018	2,002	49.0% (Lula)	–	–	–	8.3% (Temer)	–	–	–	–	42.7%
MDA	9–12 May 2018	2,002	44.9% (Lula)	–	–	–	–	–	19.6% (Alckmin)	–	–	35.5%
MDA	9–12 May 2018	2,002	45.7% (Lula)	–	–	–	–	–	–	25.9% (Bolsonaro)	–	28.4%
MDA	9–12 May 2018	2,002	–	25.7% (Gomes)	–	–	9.0% (Meirelles)	–	–	–	–	65.3%
MDA	9–12 May 2018	2,002	–	30.4% (Gomes)	–	–	5.6% (Temer)	–	–	–	–	64.0%
MDA	9–12 May 2018	2,002	–	20.9% (Gomes)	–	–	–	–	20.4% (Alckmin)	–	–	58.7%
MDA	9–12 May 2018	2,002	–	24.2% (Gomes)	–	–	–	–	–	28.2% (Bolsonaro)	–	47.6%
MDA	9–12 May 2018	2,002	–	–	–	26.6% (Silva)	–	–	18.9% (Alckmin)	–	–	54.5%
MDA	9–12 May 2018	2,002	–	–	–	27.2% (Silva)	–	–	–	27.2% (Bolsonaro)	–	45.6%
MDA	9–12 May 2018	2,002	–	–	–	–	11.7% (Meirelles)	–	–	30.8% (Bolsonaro)	–	57.5%
MDA	9–12 May 2018	2,002	–	–	–	–	5.3% (Temer)	–	–	34.7% (Bolsonaro)	–	60.0%
MDA	9–12 May 2018	2,002	–	–	–	–		–	20.2% (Alckmin)	27.8% (Bolsonaro)	–	52.0%
DataPoder360	16–19 April 2018	2,000	–	–	37% (Barbosa)	–	–	–	–	32% (Bolsonaro)	–	31%
DataPoder360	16–19 April 2018	2,000	–	–	–	–	–	–	18% (Alckmin)	41% (Bolsonaro)	–	41%
Vox Populi	13–15 April 2018	2,000	54% (Lula)	–	20% (Barbosa)	–	–	–	–	–	–	26%
Vox Populi	13–15 April 2018	2,000	54% (Lula)	–	–	16% (Silva)	–	–	–	–	–	30%
Vox Populi	13–15 April 2018	2,000	56% (Lula)	–	–	–	–	–	12% (Alckmin)	–	–	32%
Vox Populi	13–15 April 2018	2,000	55% (Lula)	–	–	–	–	–	–	17% (Bolsonaro)	–	28%
Datafolha	9–13 April 2018	4,260	21% (Haddad)	–	–	–	–	–	37% (Alckmin)	–	–	41%
Datafolha	9–13 April 2018	4,260	26% (Haddad)	–	–	–	–	–	–	37% (Bolsonaro)	–	37%
Datafolha	9–13 April 2018	4,260	46% (Lula)	–	–	32% (Silva)	–	–	–	–	–	21%
Datafolha	9–13 April 2018	4,260	48% (Lula)	–	–	–	–	–	27% (Alckmin)	–	–	24%
Datafolha	9–13 April 2018	4,260	48% (Lula)	–	–	–	–	–	–	31% (Bolsonaro)	–	20%
Datafolha	9–13 April 2018	4,260	17% (Wagner)	–	–	–	–	–	41% (Alckmin)	–	–	43%
Datafolha	9–13 April 2018	4,260	23% (Wagner)	–	–	–	–	–	–	39% (Bolsonaro)	–	38%
Datafolha	9–13 April 2018	4,260	–	32% (Gomes)	–	–	–	–	32% (Alckmin)	–	–	36%
Datafolha	9–13 April 2018	4,260	–	35% (Gomes)	–	–	–	–	–	35% (Bolsonaro)	–	31%
Datafolha	9–13 April 2018	4,260	–	–	–	44% (Silva)	–	–	27% (Alckmin)	–	–	29%
Datafolha	9–13 April 2018	4,260	–	–	–	44% (Silva)	–	–	–	31% (Bolsonaro)	–	25%
Datafolha	9–13 April 2018	4,260	–	–	–	–	–	–	33% (Alckmin)	32% (Bolsonaro)	–	34%
After Luiz Inácio Lula da Silva is sentenced to 12 years in prison by the Regional Federal Court of the 4th Region, the Supreme Federal Court rules to reject Lula's plea and an arrest warrant is given. The ruling of the TRF-4 bars Lula from running in the election
MDA	28 February–3 March 2018	2,002	43.8% (Lula)	–	–	20.3% (Silva)	–	–	–	–	–	35.9%
MDA	28 February–3 March 2018	2,002	47.5% (Lula)	–	–	–	6.8% (Temer)	–	–	–	–	45.7%
MDA	28 February–3 March 2018	2,002	44.5% (Lula)	–	–	–	–	–	22.5% (Alckmin)	–	–	33.0%
MDA	28 February–3 March 2018	2,002	44.1% (Lula)	–	–	–	–	–	–	25.8% (Bolsonaro)	–	30.1%
MDA	28 February–3 March 2018	2,002	–	–	–	36.8% (Silva)	5.3% (Temer)	–	–	–	–	57.9%
MDA	28 February–3 March 2018	2,002	–	–	–	26.3% (Silva)	–	–	24.6% (Alckmin)	–	–	49.1%
MDA	28 February–3 March 2018	2,002	–	–	–	26.6% (Silva)	–	–	–	27.7% (Bolsonaro)	–	45.7%
MDA	28 February–3 March 2018	2,002	–	–	–	–	3.8% (Temer)	–	36.6% (Alckmin)	–	–	59.6%
MDA	28 February–3 March 2018	2,002	–	–	–	–	5.7% (Temer)	–	–	36.0% (Bolsonaro)	–	58.3%
MDA	28 February–3 March 2018	2,002	–	–	–	–	–	–	24.3% (Alckmin)	26.7% (Bolsonaro)	–	49.0%
#PESQUISA365	2–7 February 2018	2,000	8.8% (Haddad)	–	28.3% (Barbosa)	–	–	–	–	–	–	63.0%
#PESQUISA365	2–7 February 2018	2,000	11.7% (Haddad)	–	–	–	11.5% (Meirelles)	–	–	–	–	76.9%
#PESQUISA365	2–7 February 2018	2,000	8.8% (Wagner)	–	–	30.5% (Silva)	–	–	–	–	–	60.8%
#PESQUISA365	2–7 February 2018	2,000	9.1% (Wagner)	–	–	–	–	17.3% (Dias)	–	–	–	73.6%
#PESQUISA365	2–7 February 2018	2,000	10.9% (Wagner)	–	–	–	–	–	23.8% (Alckmin)	–	–	65.4%
#PESQUISA365	2–7 February 2018	2,000	–	25.6% (Gomes)	–	–	8.4% (Meirelles)	–	–	–	–	66.1%
#PESQUISA365	2–7 February 2018	2,000	–	25.5% (Gomes)	–	–	–	–	6.9% (Virgílio)	–	–	67.6%
#PESQUISA365	2–7 February 2018	2,000	–	22.0% (Gomes)	–	–	–	–	17.9% (Alckmin)	–	–	60.2%
#PESQUISA365	2–7 February 2018	2,000	–	23.2% (Gomes)	–	–	–	–	–	25.8% (Bolsonaro)	–	51.1%
#PESQUISA365	2–7 February 2018	2,000	–	–	–	27.8% (Silva)	–	–	17.6% (Alckmin)	–	–	54.7%
#PESQUISA365	2–7 February 2018	2,000	–	–	–	31.2% (Silva)	–	–	6.8% (Virgílio)	–	–	62.1%
#PESQUISA365	2–7 February 2018	2,000	–	–	–	25.9% (Silva)	–	–	–	25.6% (Bolsonaro)	–	48.6%
#PESQUISA365	2–7 February 2018	2,000	–	–	–	–	–	–	17.6% (Alckmin)	25.3% (Bolsonaro)	–	57.2%
Datafolha	29–30 January 2018	2,826	47% (Lula)	–	–	32% (Silva)	–	–	–	–	–	21%
Datafolha	29–30 January 2018	2,826	49% (Lula)	–	–	–	–	–	30% (Alckmin)	–	–	22%
Datafolha	29–30 January 2018	2,826	49% (Lula)	–	–	–	–	–	–	32% (Bolsonaro)	–	20%
Datafolha	29–30 January 2018	2,826	–	32% (Gomes)	–	–	–	–	34% (Alckmin)	–	–	34%
Datafolha	29–30 January 2018	2,826	–	–	–	42% (Silva)	–	–	–	32% (Bolsonaro)	–	27%
Datafolha	29–30 January 2018	2,826	–	–	–	–	–	–	35% (Alckmin)	33% (Bolsonaro)	–	32%
Vox Populi	9–12 December 2017	2,000	50% (Lula)	–	–	13% (Silva)	–	–	–	–	–	37%
Vox Populi	9–12 December 2017	2,000	50% (Lula)	–	–	–	–	–	14% (Alckmin)	–	–	35%
Vox Populi	9–12 December 2017	2,000	49% (Lula)	–	–	–	–	–	–	18% (Bolsonaro)	–	33%
DataPoder360	8–11 December 2017	2,210	41% (Lula)	–	–	–	–	–	28% (Alckmin)	–	–	31%
DataPoder360	8–11 December 2017	2,210	41% (Lula)	–	–	–	–	–	–	30% (Bolsonaro)	–	29%
Datafolha	29–30 November 2017	2,765	48% (Lula)	–	–	35% (Silva)	–	–	–	–	–	17%
Datafolha	29–30 November 2017	2,765	52% (Lula)	–	–	–	–	–	30% (Alckmin)	–	–	18%
Datafolha	29–30 November 2017	2,765	51% (Lula)	–	–	–	–	–	–	33% (Bolsonaro)	–	16%
Datafolha	29–30 November 2017	2,765	–	33% (Gomes)	–	–	–	–	35% (Alckmin)	–	–	32%
Datafolha	29–30 November 2017	2,765	–	–	–	46% (Silva)	–	–	–	32% (Bolsonaro)	–	22%
Vox Populi	27–30 October 2017	2,000	48% (Lula)	–	–	16% (Silva)	–	–	–	–	–	35%
Vox Populi	27–30 October 2017	2,000	50% (Lula)	–	–	–	–	–	14% (Alckmin)	–	–	36%
Vox Populi	27–30 October 2017	2,000	51% (Lula)	–	–	–	–	–	14% (Doria)	–	–	35%
Vox Populi	27–30 October 2017	2,000	49% (Lula)	–	–	–	–	–	–	21% (Bolsonaro)	–	31%
Vox Populi	27–30 October 2017	2,000	50% (Lula)	–	–	–	–	–	–	–	14% (Huck)	36%
Datafolha	27–28 September 2017		17% (Haddad)	–	–	–	–	–	44% (Alckmin)	–	–	39%
Datafolha	27–28 September 2017		44% (Lula)	–	–	36% (Silva)	–	–	–	–	–	20%
Datafolha	27–28 September 2017		46% (Lula)	–	–	–	–	–	32% (Alckmin)	–	–	21%
Datafolha	27–28 September 2017		48% (Lula)	–	–	–	–	–	32% (Doria)	–	–	20%
Datafolha	27–28 September 2017		47% (Lula)	–	–	–	–	–	–	33% (Bolsonaro)	–	21%
Datafolha	27–28 September 2017		44% (Lula)	–	–	–	–	–	–	–	42% (Moro)	14%
Datafolha	27–28 September 2017		–	29% (Gomes)	–	–	–	–	37% (Alckmin)	–	–	33%
Datafolha	27–28 September 2017		–	32% (Gomes)	–	–	–	–	34% (Doria)	–	–	35%
Datafolha	27–28 September 2017		–	–	–	47% (Silva)	–	–	–	29% (Bolsonaro)	–	24%
MDA	13–16 September 2017	2,002	39.8% (Lula)	–	–	25.8% (Silva)	–	–	–	–	–	34.4%
MDA	13–16 September 2017	2,002	40.6% (Lula)	–	–	–	–	–	23.2% (Alckmin)	–	–	36.2%
MDA	13–16 September 2017	2,002	41.6% (Lula)	–	–	–	–	–	25.2% (Doria)	–	–	33.2%
MDA	13–16 September 2017	2,002	41.8% (Lula)	–	–	–	–	–	14.8% (Neves)	–	–	43.4%
MDA	13–16 September 2017	2,002	40.5% (Lula)	–	–	–	–	–	–	28.5% (Bolsonaro)	–	31.0%
MDA	13–16 September 2017	2,002	–	–	–	28.4% (Silva)	–	–	23.6% (Alckmin)	–	–	48.0%
MDA	13–16 September 2017	2,002	–	–	–	30.5% (Silva)	–	–	22.7% (Doria)	–	–	46.8%
MDA	13–16 September 2017	2,002	–	–	–	33.6% (Silva)	–	–	13.0% (Neves)	–	–	53.4%
MDA	13–16 September 2017	2,002	–	–	–	29.2% (Silva)	–	–	–	27.9% (Bolsonaro)	–	42.9%
MDA	13–16 September 2017	2,002	–	–	–	–	–	–	23.8% (Alckmin)	28.0% (Bolsonaro)	–	48.2%
MDA	13–16 September 2017	2,002	–	–	–	–	–	–	23.9% (Doria)	28.5% (Bolsonaro)	–	47.6%
MDA	13–16 September 2017	2,002	–	–	–	–	–	–	13.9% (Neves)	32.0% (Bolsonaro)	–	54.1%
Vox Populi	29–31 July 2017	1,999	52% (Lula)	–	–	15% (Silva)	–	–	–	–	–	33%
Vox Populi	29–31 July 2017	1,999	52% (Lula)	–	–	–	–	–	15% (Alckmin)	–	–	34%
Vox Populi	29–31 July 2017	1,999	53% (Lula)	–	–	–	–	–	15% (Doria)	–	–	33%
Vox Populi	29–31 July 2017	1,999	53% (Lula)	–	–	–	–	–	–	17% (Bolsonaro)	–	30%
Paraná Pesquisas	24–27 July 2017	2,020	36.3% (Lula)	–	–	29.0% (Silva)	–	–	–	–	–	34.7%
Paraná Pesquisas	24–27 July 2017	2,020	39.0% (Lula)	–	–	–	–	–	26.9% (Alckmin)	–	–	34.1%
Paraná Pesquisas	24–27 July 2017	2,020	38.5% (Lula)	–	–	–	–	–	32.2% (Doria)	–	–	29.3%
Paraná Pesquisas	24–27 July 2017	2,020	38.7% (Lula)	–	–	–	–	–	–	32.3% (Bolsonaro)	–	29.1%
Paraná Pesquisas	24–27 July 2017	2,020	37.1% (Lula)	–	31.1% (Barbosa)	–	–	–	–	–	–	31.8%
Datafolha	21–23 June 2017	2,771	40% (Lula)	–	–	40% (Silva)	–	–	–	–	–	20%
Datafolha	21–23 June 2017	2,771	45% (Lula)	–	–	–	–	–	32% (Alckmin)	–	–	24%
Datafolha	21–23 June 2017	2,771	45% (Lula)	–	–	–	–	–	34% (Doria)	–	–	20%
Datafolha	21–23 June 2017	2,771	45% (Lula)	–	–	–	–	–	–	32% (Bolsonaro)	–	22%
Datafolha	21–23 June 2017	2,771	42% (Lula)	–	–	–	–	–	–	–	44% (Moro)	14%
Datafolha	21–23 June 2017	2,771	–	31% (Gomes)	–	–	–	–	34% (Alckmin)	–	–	36%
Datafolha	21–23 June 2017	2,771	–	34% (Gomes)	–	–	–	–	32% (Doria)	–	–	34%
Datafolha	21–23 June 2017	2,771	–	–	–	49% (Silva)	–	–	–	27% (Bolsonaro)	–	25%
Vox Populi	2–4 June 2017	2,000	50% (Lula)	–	–	15% (Silva)	–	–	–	–	–	36%
Vox Populi	2–4 June 2017	2,000	52% (Lula)	–	–	–	–	–	11% (Alckmin)	–	–	37%
Vox Populi	2–4 June 2017	2,000	51% (Lula)	–	–	–	–	–	13% (Doria)	–	–	36%
Vox Populi	2–4 June 2017	2,000	53% (Lula)	–	–	–	–	–	5% (Neves)	–	–	43%
Datafolha	26–27 April 2017	2,781	38% (Lula)	–	–	41% (Silva)	–	–	–	–	–	31%
Datafolha	26–27 April 2017	2,781	43% (Lula)	–	–	–	–	–	29% (Alckmin)	–	–	28%
Datafolha	26–27 April 2017	2,781	43% (Lula)	–	–	–	–	–	32% (Doria)	–	–	25%
Datafolha	26–27 April 2017	2,781	43% (Lula)	–	–	–	–	–	27% (Neves)	–	–	30%
Datafolha	26–27 April 2017	2,781	43% (Lula)	–	–	–	–	–	–	31% (Bolsonaro)	–	26%
Datafolha	26–27 April 2017	2,781	40% (Lula)	–	–	–	–	–	–	–	42% (Moro)	18%
Datafolha	26–27 April 2017	2,781	–	24% (Gomes)	–	50% (Silva)	–	–	–	–	–	26%
Datafolha	26–27 April 2017	2,781	–	34% (Gomes)	–	–	–	–	28% (Alckmin)	–	–	37%
Datafolha	26–27 April 2017	2,781	–	36% (Gomes)	–	–	–	–	29% (Doria)	–	–	35%
Datafolha	26–27 April 2017	2,781	–	36% (Gomes)	–	–	–	–	26% (Neves)	–	–	38%
Datafolha	26–27 April 2017	2,781	–	–	–	50% (Silva)	–	–	22% (Alckmin)	–	–	28%
Datafolha	26–27 April 2017	2,781	–	–	–	50% (Silva)	–	–	24% (Doria)	–	–	26%
Datafolha	26–27 April 2017	2,781	–	–	–	49% (Silva)	–	–	21% (Neves)	–	–	29%
Vox Populi	6–10 April 2017	2,000	49% (Lula)	–	–	19% (Silva)	–	–	–	–	–	32%
Vox Populi	6–10 April 2017	2,000	51% (Lula)	–	–	–	–	–	17% (Alckmin)	–	–	32%
Vox Populi	6–10 April 2017	2,000	53% (Lula)	–	–	–	–	–	16% (Doria)	–	–	31%
Vox Populi	6–10 April 2017	2,000	50% (Lula)	–	–	–	–	–	17% (Neves)	–	–	33%
MDA	8–11 February 2017	2,002	38.9% (Lula)	–	–	27.4% (Silva)	–	–	–	–	–	28%
MDA	8–11 February 2017	2,002	42.9% (Lula)	–	–	–	19.0% (Temer)	–	–	–	–	38.1%
MDA	8–11 February 2017	2,002	39.7% (Lula)	–	–	–	–	–	26.5% (Neves)	–	–	33.8%
MDA	8–11 February 2017	2,002	–	–	–	34.4% (Silva)	16.8% (Temer)	–	–	–	–	48.8%
MDA	8–11 February 2017	2,002	–	–	–	28.3% (Silva)	–	–	28.6% (Neves)	–	–	43.1%
MDA	8–11 February 2017	2,002	–	–	–	–	13.1% (Temer)	–	34.1% (Neves)	–	–	52.8%
Vox Populi	10–14 December 2016	2,500	42% (Lula)	–	–	21% (Silva)	–	–	–	–	–	37%
Vox Populi	10–14 December 2016	2,500	45% (Lula)	–	–	–	–	–	20% (Alckmin)	–	–	35%
Vox Populi	10–14 December 2016	2,500	43% (Lula)	–	–	–	–	–	20% (Neves)	–	–	37%
Datafolha	7–8 December 2016	2,828	34% (Lula)	–	–	43% (Silva)	–	–	–	–	–	23%
Datafolha	7–8 December 2016	2,828	38% (Lula)	–	–	–	–	–	34% (Alckmin)	–	–	28%
Datafolha	7–8 December 2016	2,828	38% (Lula)	–	–	–	–	–	34% (Neves)	–	–	28%
Datafolha	7–8 December 2016	2,828	37% (Lula)	–	–	–	–	–	35% (Serra)	–	–	27%
Datafolha	7–8 December 2016	2,828	–	–	–	48% (Silva)	–	–	25% (Alckmin)	–	–	27%
Datafolha	7–8 December 2016	2,828	–	–	–	47% (Silva)	–	–	25% (Neves)	–	–	28%
Datafolha	7–8 December 2016	2,828	–	–	–	47% (Silva)	–	–	27% (Serra)	–	–	26%
MDA	13–16 October 2016	2,002	33.2% (Lula)	–	–	35.8% (Silva)	–	–	–	–	–	31.0%
MDA	13–16 October 2016	2,002	37.3% (Lula)	–	–	–	28.5% (Temer)	–	–	–	–	34.2%
MDA	13–16 October 2016	2,002	33.8% (Lula)	–	–	–	–	–	37.1% (Neves)	–	–	29.1%
MDA	13–16 October 2016	2,002	–	–	–	38.1% (Silva)	23.7% (Temer)	–	–	–	–	38.2%
MDA	13–16 October 2016	2,002	–	–	–	29.5% (Silva)	–	–	35.4% (Neves)	–	–	35.1%
MDA	13–16 October 2016	2,002	–	–	–	–	16.4% (Temer)	–	38.2% (Neves)	–	–	45.4%
Datafolha	14–15 July 2016	2,792	32% (Lula)	–	–	44% (Silva)	–	–	–	–	–	24%
Datafolha	14–15 July 2016	2,792	36% (Lula)	–	–	–	–	–	38% (Alckmin)	–	–	26%
Datafolha	14–15 July 2016	2,792	36% (Lula)	–	–	–	–	–	38% (Neves)	–	–	26%
Datafolha	14–15 July 2016	2,792	35% (Lula)	–	–	–	–	–	40% (Serra)	–	–	26%
Datafolha	14–15 July 2016	2,792	–	–	–	47% (Silva)	–	–	27% (Alckmin)	–	–	25%
Datafolha	14–15 July 2016	2,792	–	–	–	46% (Silva)	–	–	28% (Neves)	–	–	26%
Datafolha	14–15 July 2016	2,792	–	–	–	46% (Silva)	–	–	30% (Serra)	–	–	25%
MDA	2–5 June 2016	2,002	28.9% (Lula)	–	–	35% (Silva)	–	–	–	–	–	36.1%
MDA	2–5 June 2016	2,002	31.7% (Lula)	–	–	–	27.3% (Temer)	–	–	–	–	41%
MDA	2–5 June 2016	2,002	29.9% (Lula)	–	–	–	–	–	34.3% (Neves)	–	–	35.8%
MDA	2–5 June 2016	2,002	–	–	–	33.7% (Silva)	20.9% (Temer)	–	–	–	–	45.4%
MDA	2–5 June 2016	2,002	–	–	–	28% (Silva)	–	–	29.7% (Neves)	–	–	42.3%
MDA	2–5 June 2016	2,002	–	–	–	–	15.8% (Temer)	–	32.3% (Neves)	–	–	51.9%
Paraná Pesquisas	28 February–2 March 2016	2,022	22.6% (Lula)	–	–	–	–	–	53.5% (Neves)	–	–	24.0%
Paraná Pesquisas	28 February–2 March 2016	2,022	–	–	–	36.1% (Silva)	–	–	41.7% (Neves)	–	–	22.2%
MDA	18–21 February 2016	2,002	28.2% (Lula)	29.1% (Gomes)	–	–	–	–	–	–	–	42.7%
MDA	18–21 February 2016	2,002	26.3% (Lula)	–	–	36.6% (Silva)	–	–	–	–	–	37.1%
MDA	18–21 February 2016	2,002	27.5% (Lula)	–	–	–	–	–	40.6% (Neves)	–	–	31.9%
MDA	18–21 February 2016	2,002	–	16.7% (Gomes)	–		–	–	43.1% (Neves)	–	–	40.2%
MDA	18–21 February 2016	2,002	–	–	–	26.6% (Silva)	–	–	38.4% (Neves)	–	–	35.0%
MDA	18–21 February 2016	2,002	–	24.0% (Gomes)	–	33.0% (Silva)	–	–	–	–	–	43.0%
Datafolha	25–26 November 2015	3,541	31% (Lula)	–	–	52% (Silva)	–	–	–	–	–	16%
Datafolha	25–26 November 2015	3,541	34% (Lula)	–	–	–	–	–	45% (Alckmin)	–	–	21%
Datafolha	25–26 November 2015	3,541	32% (Lula)	–	–	–	–	–	51% (Neves)	–	–	17%
Datafolha	25–26 November 2015	3,541	–	–	–	49% (Silva)	–	–	33% (Alckmin)	–	–	18%
Datafolha	25–26 November 2015	3,541	–	–	–	41% (Silva)	–	–	42% (Neves)	–	–	16%
Paraná Pesquisas	October 2015	–	24.3% (Lula)	–	–	–	–	–	56.7% (Neves)	–	–	19.0%
Paraná Pesquisas	October 2015	–	–	–	–	34.1% (Silva)	–	–	47.7% (Neves)	–	–	18.2%
MDA	20–24 October 2015	2,002	30.2% (Lula)	–	–	–	–	–	36.4% (Alckmin)	–	–	33.4%
MDA	20–24 October 2015	2,002	28.3% (Lula)	–	–	–	–	–	45.9% (Neves)	–	–	25.8%
MDA	20–24 October 2015	2,002	30.9% (Lula)	–	–	–	–	–	35.2% (Serra)	–	–	33.9%
MDA	20–24 October 2015	2,002	–	–	–	39.7% (Silva)	–	–	25.9% (Alckmin)	–	–	34.4%
MDA	20–24 October 2015	2,002	–	–	–	32.9% (Silva)	–	–	37.7% (Neves)	–	–	29.4%
MDA	20–24 October 2015	2,002	–	–	–	39.6% (Silva)	–	–	26.8% (Serra)	–	–	33.6%
Paraná Pesquisas	August 2015	–	28.3% (Lula)	–	–	–	–	–	54.7% (Neves)	–	–	17.0%
Paraná Pesquisas	August 2015	–	–	–	–	35.2% (Silva)	–	–	49.2% (Neves)	–	–	15.7%
IBOPE	15–19 August 2015	2,002	37% (Lula)	–	–	–	–	–	41% (Alckmin)	–	–	23%
IBOPE	15–19 August 2015	2,002	31% (Lula)	–	–	–	–	–	50% (Neves)	–	–	19%
IBOPE	15–19 August 2015	2,002	36% (Lula)	–	–	–	–	–	43% (Serra)	–	–	21%
MDA	12–16 July 2015	2,002	32.3% (Lula)	–	–	–	–	–	39.9% (Alckmin)	–	–	27.8%
MDA	12–16 July 2015	2,002	28.5% (Lula)	–	–	–	–	–	49.6% (Neves)	–	–	21.9%
MDA	12–16 July 2015	2,002	31.8% (Lula)	–	–	–	–	–	40.3% (Serra)	–	–	27.9%
IBOPE	13–17 June 2015	2,002	39% (Lula)	–	–	–	–	–	40% (Alckmin)	–	–	21%
IBOPE	13–17 June 2015	2,002	33% (Lula)	–	–	–	–	–	48% (Neves)	–	–	18%
Paraná Pesquisas	26–31 March 2015	2,022	27.2% (Lula)	–	–	–	–	–	51.5% (Neves)	–	–	21.4%
Paraná Pesquisas	26–31 March 2015	2,022	19.4% (Rousseff)	–	–	–	–	–	57.2% (Neves)	–	–	23.4%
2014 election	26 October 2014	112,683,879	51.6% (Rousseff)	–	–	–	–	–	48.4% (Neves)	–	–	21.1%

== See also ==
=== Graphical summaries ===
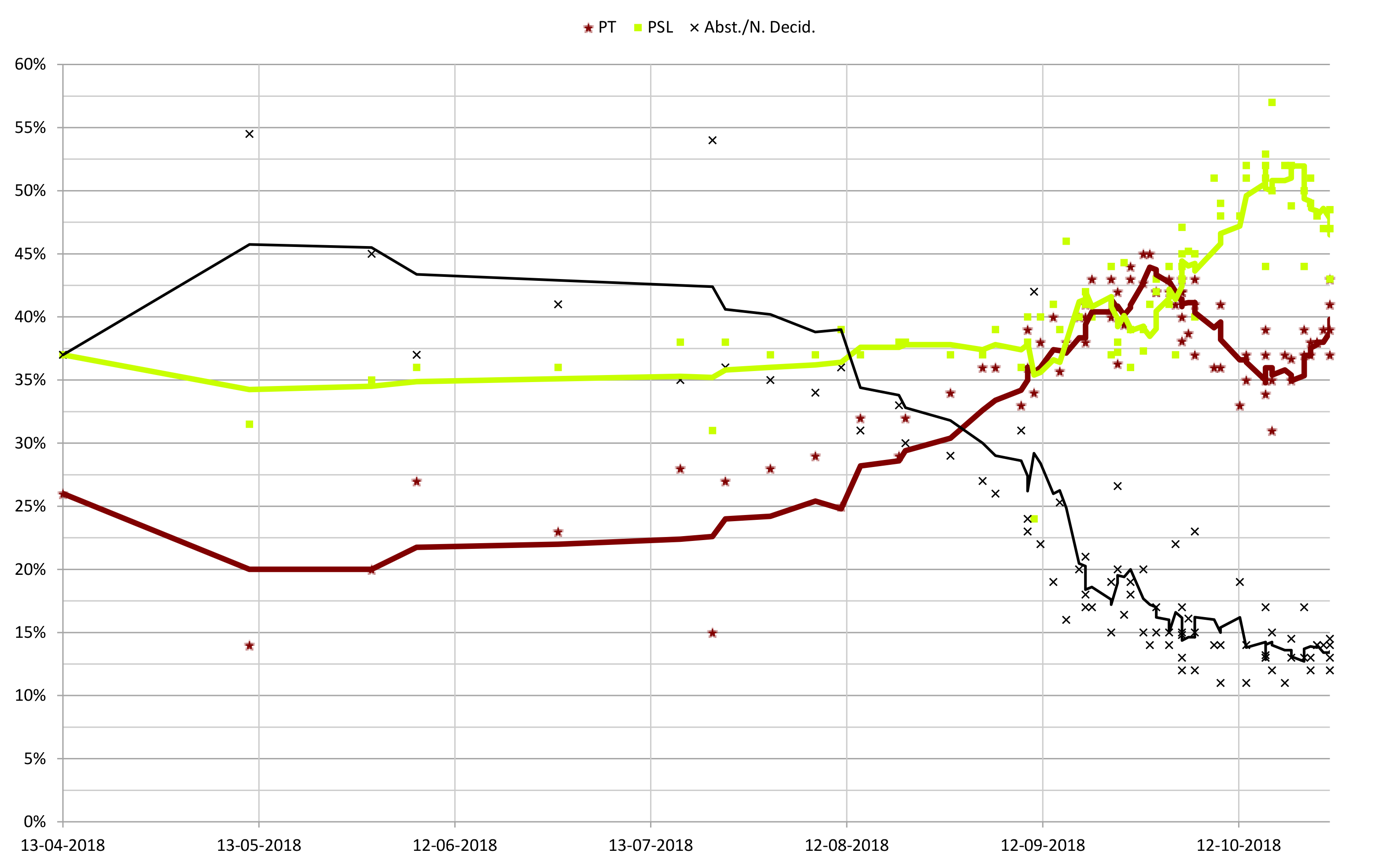
Graph showing 5 poll average trend lines of Brazilian opinion polls for the second round Fernando Haddad (PT) and Bolsonaro (PSL) from April 2018 to the most recent one.

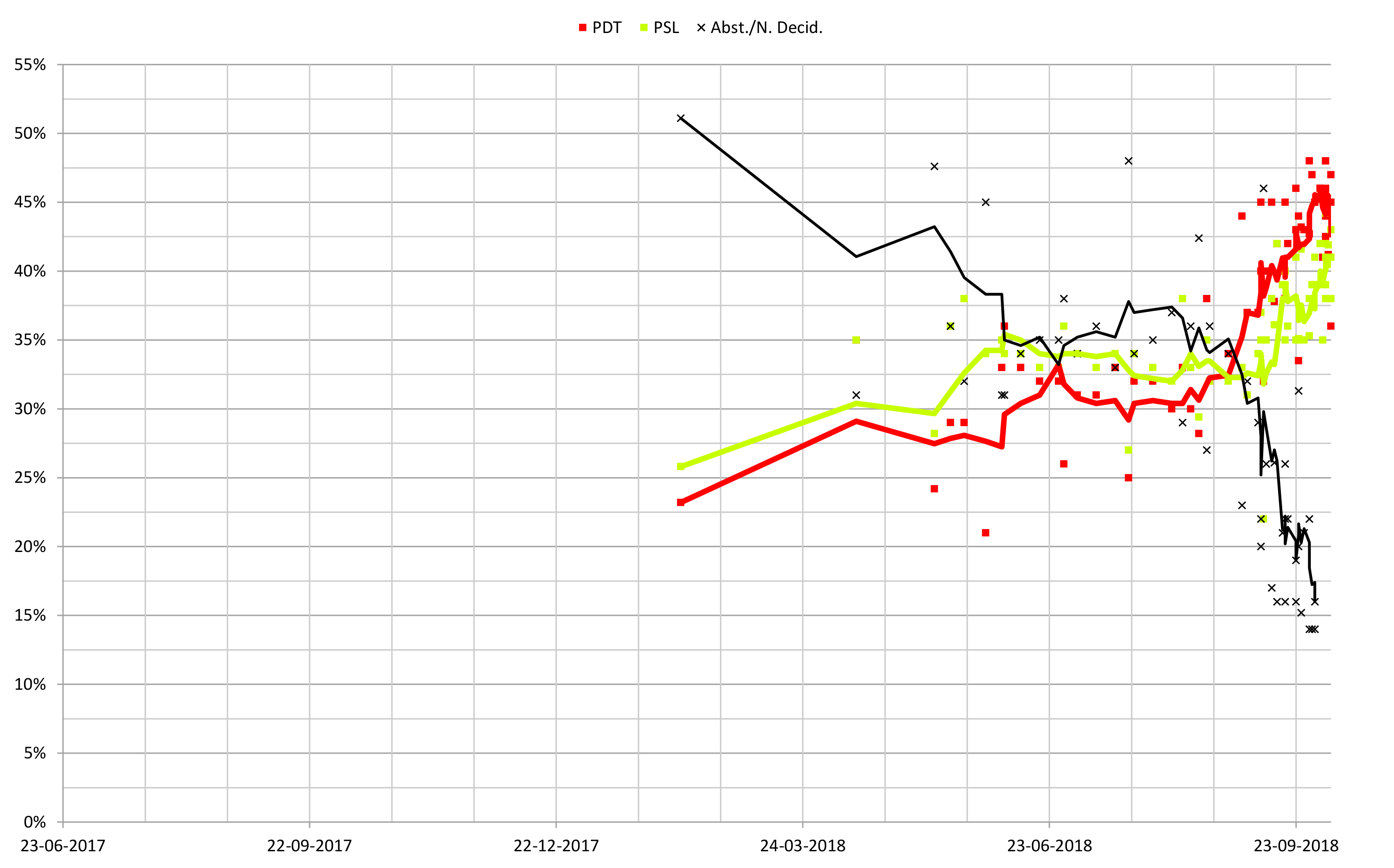
Graph showing 5 poll average trend lines of Brazilian opinion polls for the second round Ciro Gomes (PDT) and Bolsonaro (PSL) from June 2017 to the most recent one.

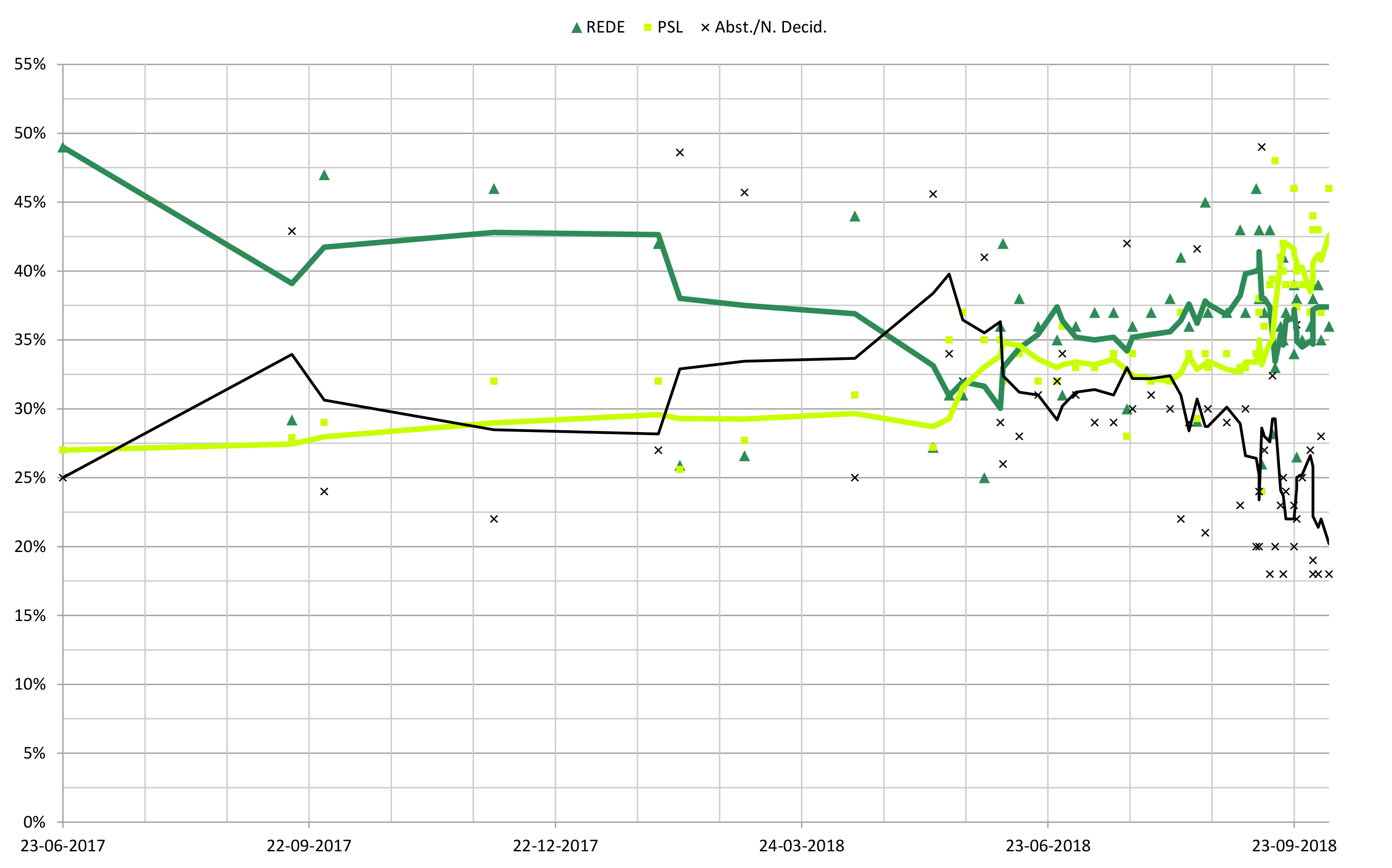
Graph showing 5 poll average trend lines of Brazilian opinion polls for the second round Marina Silva (REDE) and Bolsonaro (PSL) from June 2017 to the most recent one.
