= Sustainability Network =

Sustainability Network Rede Sustentabilidade
- Abbreviation: REDE
- Spokesperson: Heloísa Helena; Wesley Diógenes
- Founded: 16 February 2013; 13 years ago
- Registered: 22 September 2015; 11 years ago
- Split from: Socialism and Liberty Party; Brazilian Socialist Party; Green Party
- Headquarters: Brasília, Federal District
- Youth wing: Juventude em Rede
- Membership: ▲36,515
- Ideology: Environmentalism; Progressivism; Eco-socialism; Neoliberalism
- Political position: Centre-left to left-wing
- National affiliation: PSOL REDE Federation
- Colors: Teal; Turquoise; Orange
- TSE identification number: 18
- Chamber of Deputies: 4 / 513
- Federal Senate: 0 / 81

Election symbol

Website
- redesustentabilidade.org.br

The Sustainability Network (Portuguese: Rede Sustentabilidade, REDE) is an environmentalist Brazilian political party founded in 2013 by Marina Silva, a Brazilian politician from Acre. The party formed a strategic alliance with the Brazilian Socialist Party for the 2014 Brazilian general election, until its registration as an independent political party was approved in 2015. The Sustainability Network has 19,090 members as of January 2017.

For the Brazilian general election of 2018 REDE formed with the Green Party the coalition United to transform Brazil, in support of Marina Silva. For the 2022 Brazilian general election, REDE joined the Socialism and Liberty Party (PSOL) to form the PSOL REDE Federation and formed a coalition with other leftist parties for the pre-candidacy of Luiz Inácio Lula da Silva with the coalition Let's go together for Brazil.

== History ==
=== Background ===
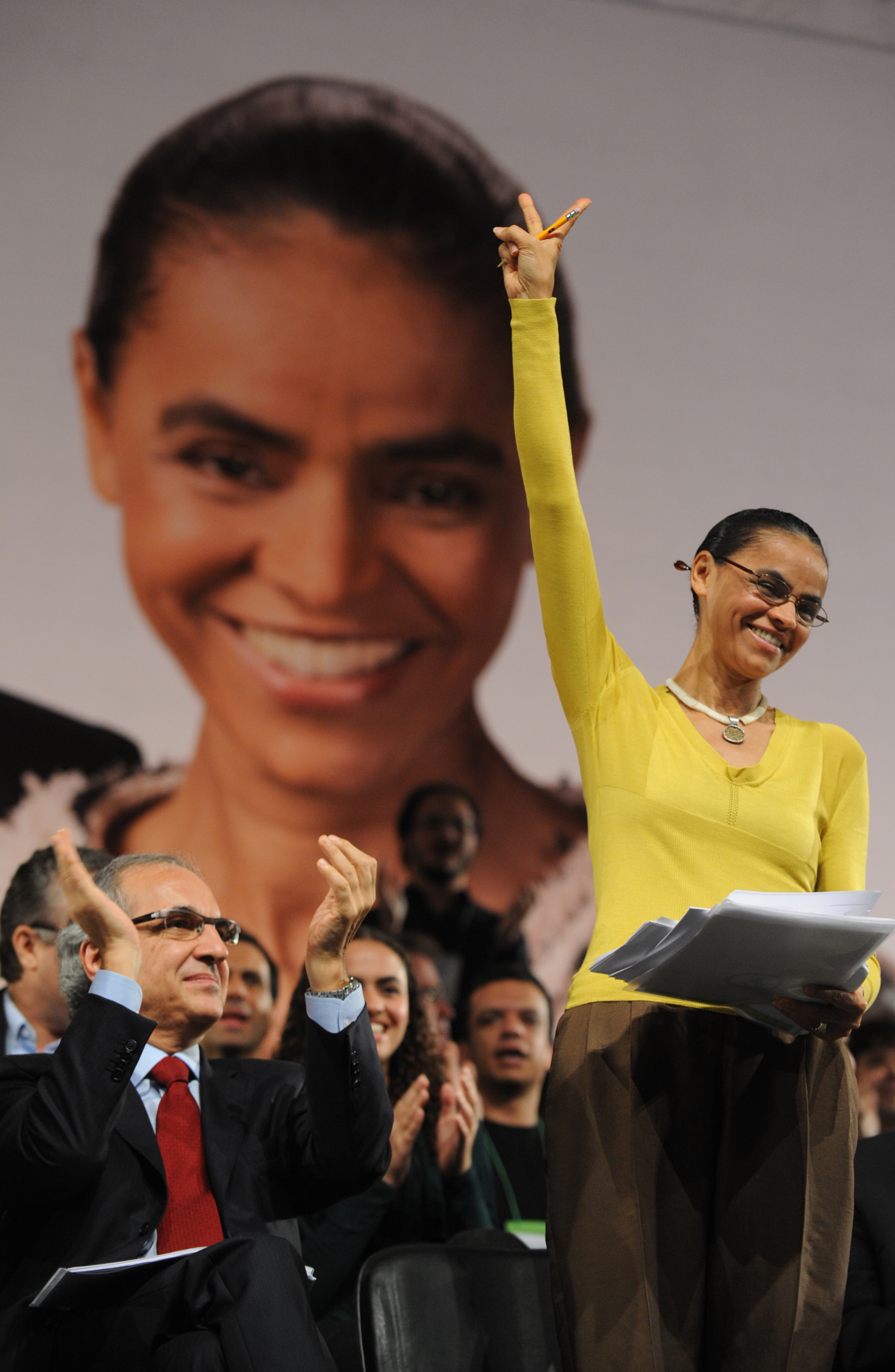
Marina Silva, the main leader of Rede Sustentabilidade.

Marina Silva, former Minister of the Environment and former senator, ran for president in the 2010 presidential election for the Green Party (PV). She received 19.6 million votes and came in third place. In June 2011, Marina left the Green Party with the intention of creating a new political party. In his farewell announcement from the party, he declared: "The experience in the PV served to feel to what extent the Brazilian political system is hardened and incapable of opening up to its own renewal."

In early November 2011, Marina began to consolidate her political project for the 2012 and 2014 elections. The Movement for a New Politics, created by Marina with the declared goal of encouraging discussions about new ways of doing politics, was considered a "precursor to a future party" of the former presidential candidate. Officially, Marina declared that the movement had no partisan or electoral objectives.

In the 2012 municipal elections, Marina declared support for candidates from different parties, such as the Workers' Party (PT), the Democratic Labor Party (PDT), and the Brazilian Socialist Party (PSB). In November of that year, the newspaper O Globo published an article stating that Marina was "adrift for 2014" and that she was facing difficulties in creating her new party. When asked by O Globo about the creation of a new party, she stated: "This is under discussion, people are pressuring, but I have many doubts about this outcome." A party is not created solely for the purpose of an election, but rather for a project, and it only makes sense if that project meets the challenges of the 21st century.

=== Foundation ===
The Sustainability Network party was officially founded on February 16, 2013, at a meeting, named the National Meeting of the Pro-Party Network, it happened in Brasília. the event was attended by former senator and councilor of Maceió Heloísa Helena, deputies Alfredo Sirkis, Walter Feldman, Domingos Dutra, from the councilor of the city of São Paulo Ricardo Young, from the councilor ex-PCB, Nelson Souza and the Secretary of Environment and sustainability of Pernambuco Sérgio Xavier, among others.

The founding event of the network received the slogan "Pro-Party Network" and was attended by about 1.5 thousand people. when the network was founded, Marina was already announced as a possible candidate by the Sustainability Network for the presidency of the Republic in the 2014 elections.

In an interview with Roda Viva, Marina denied that she was creating the network only to run for President. She said a run for the presidency was only a possibility and that final registration depended on a "legal battle."

The name "network "was chosen through suggestions made on"internet" forums. a small group formed by supporters evaluated the suggestions and chose the one they considered the most appropriate name. according to Marina Silva, "the name we are going to register is network because we are going to be a network that dialogues with different sectors of society." still according to her, the "network" also represents that technological networks will be used, institutions to convey the ideas of the party.

=== First stage of collecting signatures (2013-2014) and rejection of the electoral register ===
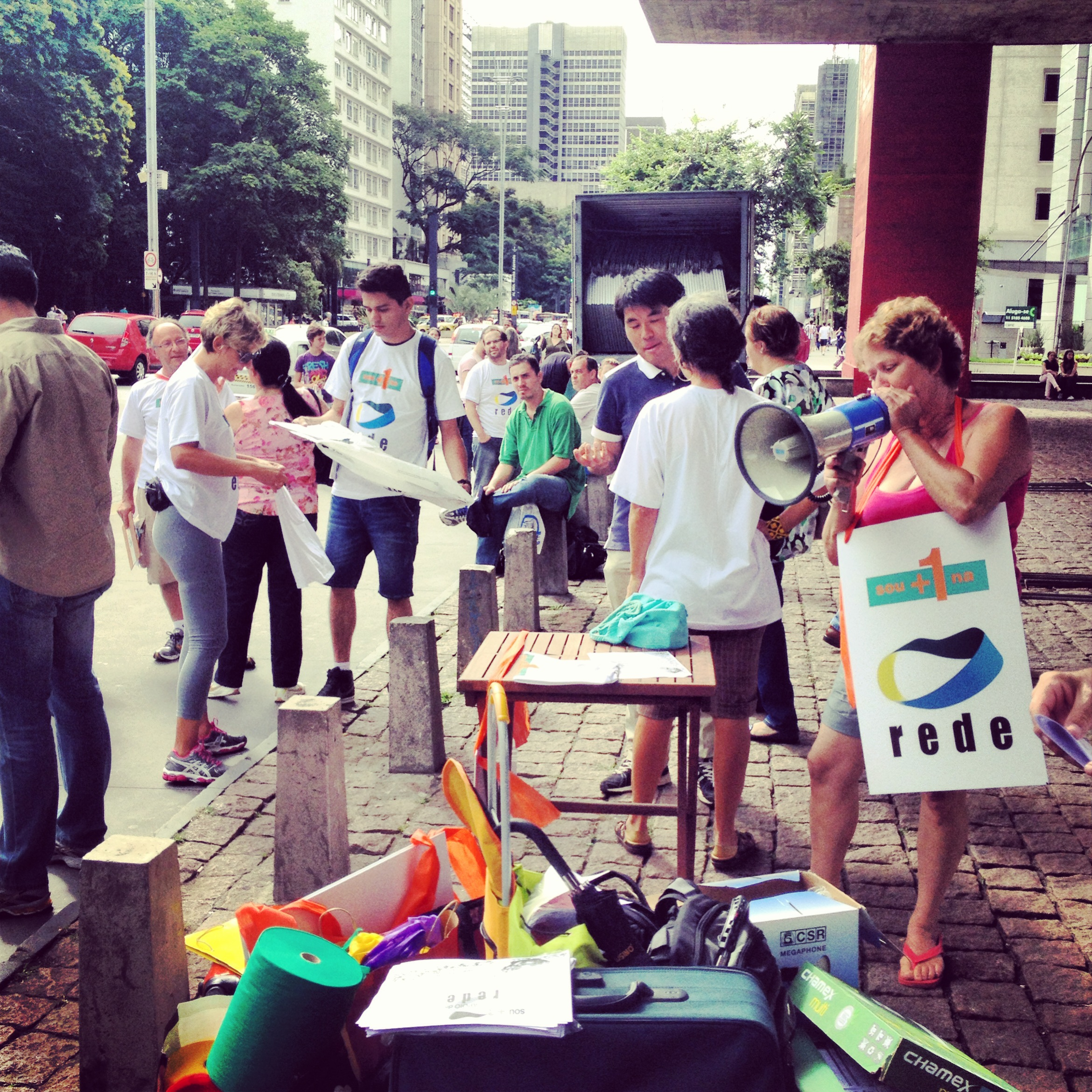
supporters of the network organize a collective of signatures at the Museu de Arte de São Paulo, February 2013.

The network believed that by May 2013 it would be possible to reach the five hundred thousand signatures required by the Superior Electoral Court (Tse) to officially become a party and contest the 2014 elections. The movement wished to collect the necessary signatures in at least nine Federative units for the Superior Electoral Court to grant its legal registration. the deadline for the creation of new parties intending to run in the 2014 elections was 5 October 2013.

In June 2013, the network announced that it already had more than half a million signatures to register with the Electoral Justice. To ensure the viability of the process, the organizers sought to obtain a margin of safety of three hundred thousand more collected names. The estimate was that there could be a loss of up to 40% of Subscriptions.

Meanwhile, in the first half of 2013, a bill 4470 of 2012 defended by the government aimed to inhibit the creation of new parties in Brazil, restricting their access to party fund money and free propaganda time on radio and television. on April 23, the Chamber of Deputies approved the bill by 188-74. in June, the matter ended up in the Supreme Federal Court (STF), where Minister Gilmar Mendes stated that the bill going through the National Congress was an initiative to prevent Marina Silva's candidacy for the presidency in 2014 and called it "anti-Marina Silva". the STF reached interfere in the project that was pending in Congress, with an injunction granted by Gilmar.

On the possibility of filing the bill and on the vote of Minister Gilmar Mendes, rapporteur who defended the filing, Marina stated: "in fact, the vote of the rapporteur tries to repair the casualism and the real trampling that was the legislative process in voting on this law, establishing that there is a disrespect for our Constitution and also our democracy. The vote establishes the right of minorities to also be able to organize and the freedom of party organization."

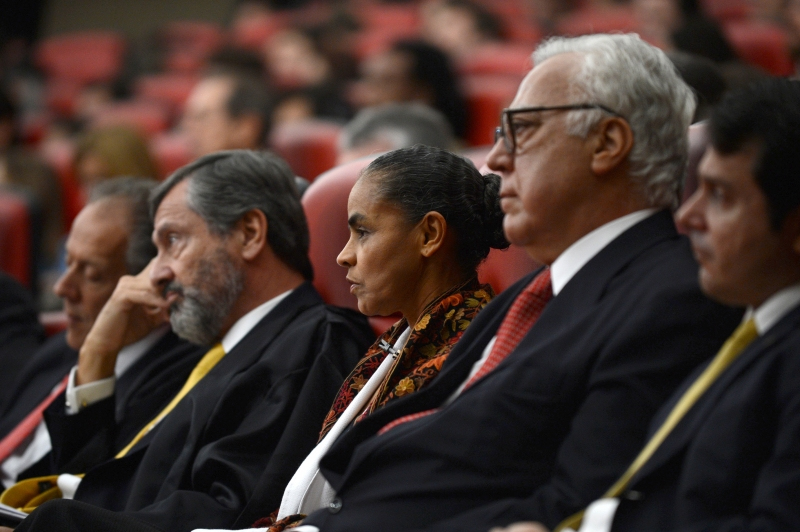
members of the network during the session of the TSE that denied the concession of the political party registration.

However, in June, the full Supreme Court overturned the injunction granted, and Congress could again discuss the processing of the project. some parliamentarians criticized the project, stating that it was unconstitutional and that it could not be valid for the 2014 elections. after approval by the Senado Federal, President Dilma Rousseff sanctioned PL 4470/12 at the end of October 2013.

On 3 October 2013, the Superior Electoral Court denied registration to the party with six votes against and one in favor. as justification, the ministers stated that the network had not reached the objective that the electoral justice requires to collect 492 thousand signatures, since many of them were challenged by the electoral registry offices. 442,525 signatures were validated, thus missing another 49 thousand to reach the required minimum. the court changed the "status" of the request to create the caption to "diligence", allowing the network to present more signatures.

After the closing of the TSE session, Marina declared the Sustainability Network would continue to be a political project. she also stated that political party registration was "a matter of time". some parliamentarians criticized the court decision, he said the process of collecting signatures was legal. the network announced that it would continue seeking the registration of the political party, even without being able to contest the elections in 2014.

=== PSB affiliations and 2014 elections ===
Soon after the registration of the legend was rejected, seven political parties were willing to accept Marina's membership. a few hours before the deadline to be able to run in the 2014 elections, she announced her membership in the Brazilian Socialist Party (PSB), stating that the Act would be a "symbolic affiliation" considering that the PSB recognized the network as a legitimate political party. Marina's affiliation was interpreted as a possible candidacy as vice president of Eduardo Campos, then governor of Pernambuco who was considered a likely candidate for president in 2014. Campos and Marina stated that the network was the "first clandestine party created in full democracy" and Marina also stated that she was not pleading for the candidacy of Eduardo Campos. president by PSB. at that time, she was in second place in polls of voting intention.

In addition to Marina, other politicians from the network also joined the PSB and other parties. just over a hundred members joined other parties to run in the 2014 elections. of these, the majority (68%) chose the PSB. the network authorized its members to support the parties they wished in the state elections and the PSB decided not to resort to party loyalty to ensure the mandates of candidates elected by the party that in the future, join the network.

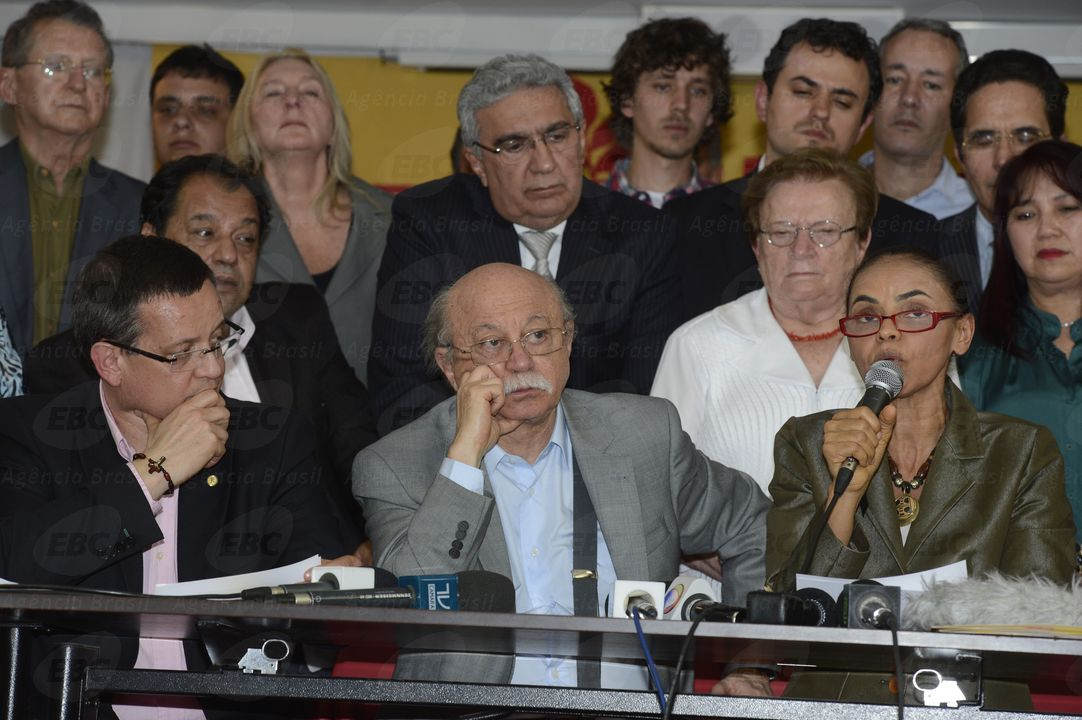
Marina Silva is announced candidate for president by PSB, August 20, 2014.

On April 14, 2014, Marina announced that she had accepted the invitation to be the vice-presidential candidate of Eduardo Campos, the presidential candidate in that year's presidential elections. that month, Ibope released a poll indicating that Marina had 27% of voting intentions if she were a candidate for president, while Campos would have 10%. in June, the Campos–Marina candidacy was made official, which also had the formal support of five other parties.

The network and the PSB expressed divergence in relation to some state alliances, especially in São Paulo, Minas Gerais, Rio de Janeiro and Paraná. in São Paulo, the network broke with Eduardo Campos and announced that it would not support the re-election of tucano Governor Geraldo Alckmin. at the national level there were also difficulties between the parties of the alliance. The president of the PPS, Roberto Freire, stated that "the PPS supports, but does not follow Marina Silva. She supports because she is vice president, she is with Eduardo Campos, who we support. But it does not follow Marina".

On August 13, Eduardo Campos died in a Cessna Citation 560 XLS+air crash in Santos. a week later, Marina was made official candidate for president by the PSB in union with the network and the other parties that supported Campos. Marina announced that she would maintain the alliances Campos had made, even those she disagreed with, but that she would not go up to the platforms of party allies in São Paulo, Rio de Janeiro and Paraná. Marina's entry as a candidate for president caused disagreements in the PSB and the Coordination of the campaign was changed. in an election marked by twists and turns, she finished in third place with 22.1 million votes (21.32%). in the second round, Marina declared support for Senator Aécio Neves (PSDB), despite internal resistance. Marina's support for Aécio generated friction in the network, causing the departure of some members, including members of the National Directorate and state representatives. officially, the network announced that it released the militants to vote for Aécio, blank or null. however, some members stated that Aécio and Dilma did not represent the group and that they would remain independent in the second round.

=== Second stage of collecting signatures (2014-2015) and obtaining the electoral register ===
In early November 2014, the Sustainability Network returned to collect signatures with the goal of reaching a new one hundred thousand supports by the end of that year. at the time, the movement announced that it intended to launch its own candidacies in the main capitals of the country in the 2016 elections. as of January 2015, the network began holding rallies across the country to collect more signatures. In March 2015, spokesman Basileu Margarido said the network had reached the number of sufficient signatures to register with the TSE. that same month, the minister of the TSE, Dias Toffoli, at the request of the network, unarchived the registration process.

In April 2015, the network announced through a note that the former president of the STF Sepúlveda Pertenece would monitor the processing of the registration application, replacing Torquato Jardim, former minister of the TSE. He said he had not yet confirmed whether he would defend the network in court.

In accordance with law 4470/12, at the time it is made official, the association will not be immediately entitled to television time and party funds. if the movement did not achieve registration by October 2015, it could not participate as a party in the 2016 municipal elections.

Although the most present members of the network affirm that the objective of the group is to transform the movement into a political party, there is a current of members who advocate the Union of the network with other existing parties to form a medium-sized political force. The ala advocates that the network join the PSB, PPS, PV and the other parties that supported Marina in 2014.

On September 22, 2015, the Sustainability Network obtained its definitive registration in the TSE and received the number 18. in the same week, six congressmen joined the new party: Senator Randolfe Rodrigues (AP, ex-PSOL), and deputies Miro Teixeira (RJ, ex-PROS), Alessandro Molon (RJ, ex-PT), Ariel Machado (PR, ex-PCdoB), João Derly (RS, ex-PCdoB) and Deputy Eliziane Gama (MA, ex-PPS). With this, the network gained the "status" of a bench in the Chamber of Deputies.

=== Acting since 2015 ===
The network was the author of the lawsuit that asks defendants to leave the presidential line of succession of the Republic, which was accepted on November 3, 2016 by the Supreme Federal Court (STF). The rapporteur of the action, Minister Marco Aurélio, initiated the vote in favor of the Prohibition of defendants to occupy the positions of the succession line of the presidency of the Republic. "Those who appear as a defendant in a criminal case in the Supreme Court cannot hold office whose constitutional duties include replacing the president of the Republic," the rapporteur said. The rapporteur's vote was followed by the majority of the ministers of the Supreme.

In December 2016, the network called for the removal of Senate President Renan Calheiros, from the presidency, based on the action on succession to the presidency, decided by the STF on November 3, 2016. on December 5, 2016, the minister of the STF Marco Aurélio Mello decided in an injunction to remove Renan Calheiros from the Senate presidency, at the request of the network.

In 2017, the party launches the "Lava Voto" campaign, whose name alludes to Operation Lava Jato. The objective of the campaign was to encourage voters to vote only for candidates without political scandals and who had not rejected the immediate continuation of the first denunciation for common crime against President Michel Temer. However, the video of the proposal did not address the politicians affiliated with the party and who are having problems in the Justice. in May 2017, the network filed with the House Ethics Committee, a request for Cassation for breach of parliamentary decorum by Senator Aécio Neves, involved in the corruption scheme reported by businessman Joesley Batista, owner of JBS. By precautionary measure, the Supreme Court (STF) determined the removal of Aécio from the position of Senator. And on June 12, 2017, the network filed a request with the Supreme Federal Court to annul the judgment of the Dilma–Temer ticket Cassation process in the Superior Electoral Court (TSE). The caption asked that a new trial be made, this time taking into account the information from the allegations of former Odebrecht executives.

In the municipal elections of 2020, the party elects 5 mayors and 144 councilors, without electing any mayor in the Capitals as in the previous municipal election where Clécio Luís was re-elected in Macapá.

In the general elections in 2022 only 2 federal deputies were elected together with the PSOL which elected 12 totaling 14 in the Federation.

In the 2024 Brazilian municipal elections, the party elected 4 mayors and 172 councilors, without electing any mayor in the Capitals. Councillors were elected in the capitals of São Paulo, Macapá, Belém, Natal and Aracaju. In other capitals, the Sustainability Network figured in the first supplència, as in Belo Horizonte, Curitiba and Salvador.

== Ideology ==
The party has been described as left-wing, centre-left, centrist, centre-right, and right-wing. The party supports green capitalism with a strong emphasis on environmentalist measures, as its main issue. At economic issues, the party has been described as being in favour of a neoliberal system and on the right-wing of the political spectrum. On the other hand, at social issues, the party has relied on progressivism, environmentalism, human rights and leftist policies.

== Electoral history ==
=== Presidential elections ===
Election	Candidate	Running mate	Coalition	First round		Second round		Result
Election	Candidate	Running mate	Coalition	Votes	%	Votes	%	Result
2018	Marina Silva (REDE)	Eduardo Jorge (PV)	REDE; PV	1,069,578	1.00% (#8)	–	–	Lost ✗
2022	Luiz Inácio Lula da Silva (PT)	Geraldo Alckmin (PSB)	PT; PCdoB; PV; PSOL; REDE; PSB; Solidariedade; Avante; Agir	57,259,405	48.43% (#1)	60,345,999	50.90% (#1)	Won ✓
2026	Luiz Inácio Lula da Silva (PT)	Geraldo Alckmin (PSB)	PT; PCdoB; PV; PSOL; REDE; PSB; PDT	53,879,538	45.16% (#2)	64,256,232	51.79% (#1)	Won ✓
Source: Election Resources: Federal Elections in Brazil – Results Lookup

=== Legislative elections ===
Election	Chamber of Deputies				Federal Senate				Role in government
Election	Votes	%	Seats	+/–	Votes	%	Seats	+/–	Role in government
2018	816,784	0.83%	1 / 513	New	7,166,003	4.18%	5 / 81	New	Opposition
2022 (Note: Ran in federation with the Socialism and Liberty Party.)	782,917	0.72%	2 / 513	▲1	8,133	0.01%	1 / 81	▼4	Coalition
2026	264,181	0.23%	1 / 513	▼1	10,777,999	5.20%	1 / 81	0	Coalition

== See also ==
- Liberalism in Brazil#Social liberalism and "Third Way"
- Progressive neoliberalism

Preceded by 16 – UWSP (PSTU)	Numbers of Brazilian Official Political Parties; 18 – NETWORK (REDE)	Succeeded by 20 – PODE
