= 2014 Brazilian general election =

- Presidential election
- 5 October 2014 (first round); 26 October 2014 (second round)
- Opinion polls
- Turnout: 80.61% (first round, ▼1.27 pp); 78.90% (second round, ▲0.40 pp)
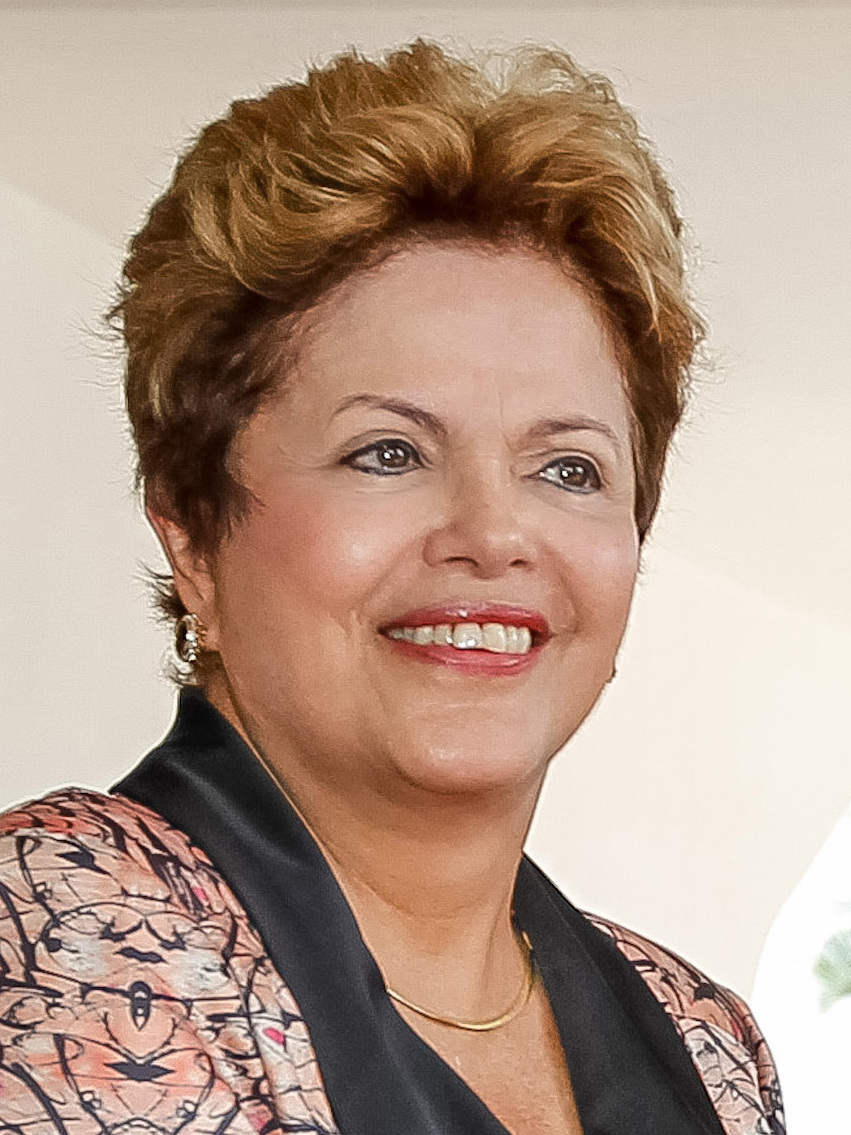

Nominee	Dilma Rousseff	Aécio Neves
Party	PT	PSDB
Alliance	With the Strength of the People	Change Brazil
Running mate	Michel Temer (PMDB)	Aloysio Nunes
Popular vote	54,501,118	51,041,155
Percentage	51.64%	48.36%
President before election
Dilma Rousseff
PT
Elected President
Dilma Rousseff
PT
- Chamber of Deputies
- All 513 seats in the Chamber of Deputies; 257 seats needed for a majority
Party	Leader	Vote %	Seats	+/–
PT	Vicente Paulo da Silva	13.94	69	−19
PSDB	Antônio Imbassahy	11.39	54	+1
PMDB	Eduardo Cunha	11.10	66	−13
PP	Eduardo da Fonte	6.61	38	−5
PSB	Beto Albuquerque	6.44	34	0
PSD		6.14	36	New
PR	Bernardo Santana	5.79	34	−7
Republicanos	George Hilton	4.55	21	+13
DEM	Mendonça Filho	4.20	21	−21
PTB	Jovair Arantes	4.02	25	+4
PDT	Félix Mendonça Júnior	3.57	19	−9
Solidarity		2.77	15	New
PSC	André Moura	2.59	13	−5
PV	Sarney Filho	2.06	8	−7
PROS		2.03	11	New
PPS	Rubens Bueno	2.01	10	−2
PCdoB	Jandira Feghali	1.97	10	−5
PSOL	Ivan Valente	1.79	5	+2
PHS	None	0.95	5	+3
PTdoB	Luis Tibé	0.84	1	−2
PSL	None	0.83	1	0
PRP	Francisco Sampaio	0.75	3	+1
PTN	None	0.74	4	+4
PEN		0.69	2	New
PSDC		0.52	2	+2
PMN		0.48	3	−1
PRTB		0.47	1	−1
PTC		0.35	2	+1
This lists parties that won seats. See the complete results below.
- Federal Senate
- 27 of the 81 seats in the Federal Senate
Party	Leader	Vote %	Seats	+/–
PSDB	Aloysio Nunes	26.73	10	−1
PT	Humberto Costa	16.96	12	−3
PMDB	Eunício Oliveira	13.58	18	−1
PSB	Rodrigo Rollemberg	13.57	7	+4
PSD		8.00	3	New
PDT	Acir Gurgacz	4.04	8	+4
DEM	José Agripino	3.93	5	−1
PTB	Gim Argello	3.14	3	−3
PROS		2.50	1	New
PP	Francisco Dornelles	2.16	5	0
PSOL	Randolfe Rodrigues	1.17	1	−1
PCdoB	Vanessa Grazziotin	0.90	1	−1
PV	Paulo Davim	0.81	1	+1
PR	Alfredo Nascimento	0.78	4	0
Solidarity		0.41	1	New
Republicanos	Marcelo Crivella	0.34	1	0
This lists parties that won seats. See the complete results below.

General elections were held in Brazil on 5 October 2014 to elect the president, the National Congress, and state governorships. As no candidate in the presidential election received more than 50% of the vote in the first round on 5 October 2014, a second-round runoff was held on 26 October 2014.

Elections were held in the midst of the devastating 2014 Brazilian economic crisis. President Dilma Rousseff of the left-wing Workers' Party ran for reelection, choosing incumbent Vice President Michel Temer of the centre-right Brazilian Democratic Movement as her running mate. During her first term, Rousseff's presidency was rocked by the 2013 protests in Brazil, initiated mainly by the Free Fare Movement, in response to social inequality in the country.

Aécio Neves, a senator from the electorally-crucial state of Minas Gerais and the grandson of former president-elect Tancredo Neves, entered the race as the candidate of the centre-right Brazilian Social Democracy Party. Neves, who previously served as a popular governor of Minas Gerais, had previously considered running for president in 2010 before ultimately declining. Unlike in past presidential elections, the PSDB ticket consisted of two members of the party, with São Paulo Senator Aloysio Nunes serving as his running mate.

Former Pernambuco Governor Eduardo Campos, who had served with Rousseff in the left-wing Lula administration, entered the race as a centre-left alternative to Rousseff on the Brazilian Socialist Party (PSB) ticket. For his running mate, Campos chose Marina Silva, an environmentalist politician from the state of Acre who performed unexpectedly well in the 2010 presidential election. However, Campos died in a plane crash less than two months before the first round of voting, and Silva replaced him at the top of the ticket.

In the first round of voting, Dilma Rousseff won 41.6% of the vote, ahead of Aécio Neves with 33.6% and Marina Silva with 21.3%. Rousseff and Neves contested the runoff on 26 October, and Rousseff won re-election by a narrow margin, 51.6% to Neves' 48.4%, the closest margin for a Brazilian presidential election since 1989.

== Presidential election ==
Incumbent President Dilma Rousseff of the Workers' Party (PT), Brazil's first female president, was challenged by 11 other candidates. Minas Gerais Senator Aécio Neves from the Brazilian Social Democracy Party (PSDB) and Marina Silva from the Brazilian Socialist Party (PSB) were her main rivals. Since none of the candidates obtained over 50% of the valid votes in the 5 October election, a second-round election was held on 26 October between Rousseff and Neves, who had finished first and second respectively in the 5 October vote.

In the run-up to the election, allies of 2010 PSDB presidential nominee José Serra pushed for Governor of São Paulo Geraldo Alckmin, who served as the party's nominee in 2006, to serve as the party's nominee versus Dilma. One of the people who pushed for Alckmin's nomination was Senator from São Paulo Aloysio Nunes, who was later chosen as the running mate of Neves.

The original PSB candidate had been Eduardo Campos. However, he died in a plane crash in Santos on 13 August 2014, after which the party chose Silva, who had been his running mate, to replace him as the presidential candidate.

Conservative federal deputy Jair Bolsonaro had publicly declared his interest in running for either the presidency or vice presidency in the run-up to the election. However, Bolsonaro did not enter the race.

=== Aécio Neves running mate selection ===
Six potential running mates were speculated on as potential vice presidential candidates to run with Aécio Neves on the PSDB ticket, according to O Globo.

- Aloysio Nunes, senator from São Paulo (PSDB) - selected
- Mara Gabrilli, federal deputy from São Paulo and deputy party chairwoman (PSDB)
- Fernando Henrique Cardoso, former president of Brazil (PSDB)
- José Agripino Maia, president of the Democrats, a party allied with the PSDB (DEM)
- Ellen Gracie Northfleet, former justice of the Supreme Federal Court (non-partisan)
- Joaquim Barbosa, justice of the Supreme Federal Court (non-partisan)

=== Campaign issues ===
==== Economy ====
===== Dilma Rousseff =====
Rousseff defended the significant economic gains and improvements in living standards during her administration and that of her predecessor, Lula da Silva.

===== Aécio Neves =====
Neves proposed sweeping reductions in the welfare state and state intervention in the economy.

==== Use of digital manipulation ====
The election saw significant use of bots by candidates. Both Dilma Rousseff (PT) and Aécio Neves (PSDB) employed automated accounts across platforms like Twitter, Facebook, and WhatsApp to amplify their messages as a form of propaganda. The Federal University of Espírito Santo and Folha de São Paulo identified a spike in bot activity during debates, with Neves' hashtags tripling in tweets within minutes.

Rousseff's support group, Muda Mais, identified over 60 automated Twitter accounts that retweeted Neves' content more than 180 times each. Rousseff’s campaign also documented the existence of automated accounts, mainly on Twitter and Facebook, which attacked her and supported Neves. These accounts were linked to a businessman who had received R$130,000 to bolster Neves’ campaign, which led to calls for fines between R$5,000 and R$30,000 under Brazil's electoral laws.

Rousseff’s campaign also employed bots, though on a smaller scale compared to Neves’ team. Leaked internal memoranda from Rousseff’s campaign revealed that the Neves campaign had spent an estimated R$10 million to buy and deploy bots on social networks, including WhatsApp, to push political messages.

Although Brazilian electoral laws prohibit paid social media campaign, private entities bypassed these restrictions by deploying bots on behalf of candidates. Neves' campaign reportedly spent R$10 million on these bots.

==== Allegations of corruption ====
Shortly before the election, a former executive of the state-run oil company Petrobras accused a minister, three state governors, six senators and dozens of congressmen from President Dilma Rousseff's Workers’ Party (PT) and several coalition allies of having accepted kickback payments from contracts.

=== Candidates ===
==== Candidates in runoff ====
Party	Presidential candidate		Vice presidential candidate (Note: Same party as the presidential candidate, unless mentioned in parentheses)		Coalition
Workers' Party (PT 13)	Dilma Rousseff	Dilma Rousseff; President of Brazil (2011–2016); Chief of Staff of the Presidency (2005–2010)	Michel Temer	Michel Temer (PMDB); Vice President of Brazil (2011–2016); President of the Chamber of Deputies (1997–2001; 2009–2010)	With the Strength of the People: Workers' Party (PT); Brazilian Democratic Movement Party (PMDB); Social Democratic Party (PSD); Progressive Party (PP); Party of the Republic (PR); Democratic Labour Party (PDT); Republican Party of the Social Order (PROS); Communist Party of Brazil (PCdoB)
Brazilian Social Democracy Party (PSDB 45)	Aécio neves	Aécio Neves; Senator for Minas Gerais (2011–2019); Governor of Minas Gerais (2003–2010)	Aloysio Nunes	Aloysio Nunes; Senator for São Paulo (2011–2019); Minister of Justice (2001–2002)	Change Brazil: Brazilian Social Democracy Party (PSDB); Solidariedade (SD); Party of National Mobilization (PMN); National Ecologic Party (PEN); National Labour Party (PTN); Christian Labour Party (PTC); Democrats (DEM); Labour Party of Brazil (PTdoB); Brazilian Labour Party (PTB)

==== Candidates failing to make runoff ====
Party	Presidential candidate		Vice presidential candidate		Coalition
United Socialist Workers' Party (PSTU 16)	José Maria de Almeida	José Maria de Almeida		Cláudia Durans	—N/a
Social Christian Party (PSC 20)	Everaldo Pereira	Everaldo Pereira; Deputy Chief of Staff of Rio de Janeiro (1999–2003)		Leonardo Gadelha	—N/a
Brazilian Communist Party (PCB 21)	Mauro Iasi	Mauro Iasi	Sofia Manzano	Sofia Manzano	—N/a
Christian Social Democratic Party (PSDC 27)	José Maria Eymael	José Maria Eymael; Federal Deputy for São Paulo (1986–1995)		Roberto Lopes	—N/a
Brazilian Labour Renewal Party (PRTB 28)	Levy Fidelix	Levy Fidelix		José Alves de Oliveira	—N/a
Workers' Cause Party (PCO 29)	Rui Costa Pimenta	Rui Costa Pimenta		Ricardo Machado	—N/a
Brazilian Socialist Party (PSB 40)	Marina Silva	Marina Silva; Senator for Acre (1995–2011)	Beto Albuquerque	Beto Albuquerque; Federal Deputy for Rio Grande do Sul (1995–2015)	United for Brazil: Brazilian Socialist Party (PSB); Popular Socialist Party (PPS); Social Liberal Party (PSL); Humanist Party of Solidarity (PHS); Free Fatherland Party (PPL); Progressive Republican Party (PRP)
Green Party (PV 43)	Eduardo Jorge	Eduardo Jorge; Federal Deputy for São Paulo (1986–2003)	Célia Sacramento	Célia Sacramento; Vice Mayor of Salvador (2013–2017)	—N/a
Socialism and Liberty Party (PSOL 50)	Luciana Genro	Luciana Genro; Federal Deputy for Rio Grande do Sul (2003–2011)	Jorge Paz	Jorge Paz	—N/a

=== Debates ===
2014 Brazilian presidential election debates
No.	Date	Host and Location	Moderator	Participants							
Key: P Present N Not invited Out Out of the election				PT	PSDB	PSB	PSOL	PV	PSC	PRTB	PSDC
Key: P Present N Not invited Out Out of the election				Rousseff	Neves	Silva	Genro	Jorge	Pereira	Fidelix	Eymael
1.1	Tuesday, 26 August 2014	Band TV; São Paulo, Morumbi	Ricardo Boechat	P	P	P	P	P	P	P	N
1.2	Monday, 1 September 2014	SBT, Folha de S. Paulo, Jovem Pan, UOL; Osasco, Industrial Anhanguera	Carlos Nascimento	P	P	P	P	P	P	P	N
1.3	Tuesday, 16 September 2014	TV Aparecida, CNBB; Aparecida, São Paulo	Rodolpho Gamberini	P	P	P	P	P	P	P	P
1.4	Sunday, 28 September 2014	RecordTV, R7; São Paulo, Lapa	Adriana Araújo, Celso Freitas	P	P	P	P	P	P	P	N
1.5	Thursday, 2 October 2014	TV Globo, G1; Rio de Janeiro, Jacarepaguá	William Bonner	P	P	P	P	P	P	P	N
2.1	Tuesday, 14 October 2014	Band TV; São Paulo, Morumbi	Ricardo Boechat	P	P	Out					
2.2	Thursday, 16 October 2014	SBT, Folha de S. Paulo, Jovem Pan, UOL; Osasco, Industrial Anhanguera	Carlos Nascimento	P	P	Out					
2.3	Sunday, 19 October 2014	RecordTV, R7; São Paulo, Lapa	Adriana Araújo, Celso Freitas	P	P	Out					
2.4	Friday, 24 October 2014	TV Globo, G1; Rio de Janeiro, Jacarepaguá	William Bonner	P	P	Out					

=== Opinion polls ===
==== First round ====
Polling aggregates
- Active candidates
- Dilma Rousseff (PT)
- Aécio Neves (PSDB)
- Marina Silva (PSB)
- Eduardo Campos (PSB)
- Others
- Abstentions/undecided

View source data.

Pollster/client(s)	Date(s) conducted	Sample size	Rousseff PT	Lula PT	Neves PSDB	Serra PSDB	Silva PSB/PV	Campos PSB	Genro PSOL	Rodrigues PSOL	Sampaio PSOL	Pereira PSC	Jorge PV	Others	Abst. Undec.	Lead
2014 election	5 Oct	–	41.59%	–	33.55%	–	21.32%	–	1.55%	–	–	0.75%	0.61%	0.64%	9.64%	8.04
Ibope (exit poll)	5 Oct	64,200	44%	–	30%	–	22%	–	1%	–	–	<1%	<1%	<1%	–	14%
Datafolha	3–4 Oct	18,116	40%	–	24%	–	22%	–	1%	–	–	1%	1%	<1%	10%	16%
Datafolha	29–30 Sep	7,520	40%	–	20%	–	25%	–	1%	–	–	1%	<1%	<1%	10%	15%
Ibope	27–29 Sep	3,010	39%	–	19%	–	25%	–	1%	–	–	1%	<1%	<1%	14%	14%
Ibope	20–22 Sep	3,010	38%	–	19%	–	29%	–	<1%	–	–	1%	<1%	<1%	12%	9%
Vox Populi	20–21 Sep	2,000	40%	–	17%	–	22%	–	1%	–	–	1%	0%	0%	18%	18%
Datafolha	17–18 Sep	5,340	37%	–	17%	–	30%	–	1%	–	–	1%	<1%	<1%	13%	7%
Ibope	13–15 Sep	3,010	36%	–	19%	–	30%	–	<1%	–	–	1%	<1%	<1%	13%	6%
Vox Populi	13–14 Sep	2,000	36%	–	15%	–	27%	–	1%	–	–	1%	1%	<1%	20%	9%
Datafolha	8–9 Sep	10,568	36%	–	15%	–	33%	–	1%	–	–	1%	1%	<1%	13%	3%
CNI/Ibope	5–8 Sep	2,002	39%	–	15%	–	31%	–	<1%	–	–	1%	<1%	<1%	13%	8%
Datafolha	1–3 Sep	10,054	35%	–	14%	–	34%	–	1%	–	–	1%	1%	1%	13%	1%
Ibope	31 Aug–2 Sep	2,506	37%	–	15%	–	33%	–	<1%	–	–	1%	<1%	<1%	12%	4%
Datafolha	28–29 Aug	2,874	34%	–	15%	–	34%	–	<1%	–	–	2%	<1%	<1%	14%	Tie
CNT/MDA	21–24 Aug	2,202	36.2%	–	16.0%	–	28.2%	–	0.3%	–	–	1.3%	0.4%	0.5%	19.1%	8.0%
Ibope	23–25 Aug	2,506	34%	–	19%	–	29%	–	1%	–	–	1%	<1%	<1%	15%	5%
Datafolha	14–15 Aug	2,843	36%	–	20%	–	21%	–	<1%	–	–	3%	1%	<1%	17%	15%
Datafolha	14–15 Aug	2,843	41%	–	25%	–	–	–	<1%	–	–	4%	1%	2%	25%	16%
13 Aug		Eduardo Campos dies in a plane crash; Marina Silva is nominated the new PSB candidate														
Ibope	3–6 Aug	2,506	38%	–	23%	–	–	9%	1%	–	–	3%	1%	1%	24%	15%
Ibope	18–21 Jul	2,002	38%	–	22%	–	–	8%	1%	–	–	3%	1%	1%	25%	16%
Datafolha	15–16 Jul	5,377	36%	–	20%	–	–	8%	1%	–	–	3%	1%	3%	27%	16%
Datafolha	1–2 Jul	2,857	38%	–	20%	–	–	9%	1%	–	–	4%	1%	3%	24%	18%
Ibope	13–15 Jun	2,002	39%	–	21%	–	–	10%	–	–	–	3%	–	6%	21%	18%
Ibope	4–7 Jun	2,002	38%	–	22%	–	–	13%	–	–	–	3%	1%	3%	20%	16%
Datafolha	3–5 Jun	4,337	34%	–	19%	–	–	7%	–	–	–	–	–	–	30%	15%
Vox Populi	31 May–1 Jun	2,200	40%	–	21%	–	–	8%	–	<1%	–	2%	<1%	<1%	28%	19%
Ibope	15–19 May	2,002	40%	–	20%	–	–	11%	–	–	–	3%	1%	1%	24%	20%
Datafolha	7–8 May	2,844	37%	–	20%	–	–	11%	–	1%	–	3%	1%	2%	24%	17%
Datafolha	7–8 May	2,844	41%	–	22%	–	–	14%	–	–	–	–	–	–	23%	19%
Datafolha	7–8 May	2,844	–	52%	19%	–	–	11%	–	–	–	–	–	–	18%	33%
Datafolha	7–8 May	2,844	–	49%	17%	–	–	9%	–	1%	–	2%	1%	2%	19%	32%
Ibope	10–14 Apr	2,002	37%	–	14%	–	–	6%	–	1%	–	2%	0%	1%	37%	23%
Ibope	10–14 Apr	2,002	37%	–	14%	–	10%	–	–	1%	–	2%	–	0%	33%	23%
Vox Populi	6–8 Apr	2,200	40%	–	16%	–	–	10%	–	0%	–	2%	1%	3%	29%	22%
Datafolha	2–3 Apr	2,637	38%	–	16%	–	–	10%	–	0%	–	2%	1%	3%	29%	22%
Datafolha	2–3 Apr	2,637	43%	–	18%	–	–	14%	–	–	–	–	–	–	25%	25%
Datafolha	2–3 Apr	2,637	39%	–	16%	–	27%	–	–	–	–	–	–	–	19%	12%
Datafolha	2–3 Apr	2,637	–	52%	16%	–	–	11%	–	–	–	–	–	–	21%	36%
Datafolha	2–3 Apr	2,637	–	48%	14%	–	23%	–	–	–	–	–	–	–	15%	25%
Ibope	13–17 Mar	2,002	40%	–	13%	–	–	6%	–	1%	–	3%	–	0%	36%	27%
Ibope	13–17 Mar	2,002	40%	–	13%	–	9%	–	–	1%	–	2%	–	0%	34%	27%
Datafolha	19–20 Feb	2,614	47%	–	17%	–	–	12%	–	–	–	–	–	–	24%	30%
Datafolha	19–20 Feb	2,614	43%	–	15%	–	23%	–	–	–	–	–	–	–	24%	28%
Datafolha	19–20 Feb	2,614	42%	–	15%	–	–	8%	–	–	–	–	–	16%	20%	22%
Datafolha	19–20 Feb	2,614	41%	–	12%	–	17%	–	–	–	–	–	–	14%	16%	24%
Datafolha	19–20 Feb	2,614	44%	–	16%	–	–	9%	–	<1%	–	3%	1%	1%	26%	28%
Datafolha	19–20 Feb	2,614	–	54%	15%	–	–	9%	–	–	–	–	–	–	21%	39%
Datafolha	19–20 Feb	2,614	–	51%	14%	–	19%	–	–	–	–	–	–	–	16%	32%
Vox Populi	13–15 Feb	2,201	41%	–	17%	–	–	6%	–	<1%	–	<1%	–	<1%	35%	24%
2010 election	3 Oct 2010	–	46.91%	–	–	32.61%	19.33%	–	–	–	0.87%	–	–	0.28	8.64%	14.30

==== Second round ====
Polling aggregates
- Active candidates
- Dilma Rousseff (PT)
- Aécio Neves (PSDB)

View source data.

Pollster/client(s)	Date(s) conducted	Sample size	Rousseff PT	Neves PSDB	Abst. Undec.	Lead
2014 election	26 Oct	–	51.64%	48.36%	6.34%	3.28%
Valid votes
Vox Populi	25 Oct	2,000	54%	46%	–	8%
Datafolha	24–25 Oct	19,318	52%	48%	–	3%
Ibope	24–25 Oct	3,010	53%	47%	–	6%
CNT/MDA	23–24 Oct	2,002	49.7%	50.3%	–	0.6%
Datafolha	22–23 Oct	9,910	53%	47%	–	6%
Datafolha	21 Oct	4,355	52%	48%	–	4%
Ibope	20–22 Oct	3,010	54%	46%	–	8%
Datafolha	20 Oct	4,389	52%	48%	–	4%
Vox Populi	18–19 Oct	2,000	52%	48%	–	4%
CNT/MDA	18–19 Oct	2,002	50.5%	49.5%	–	1%
Datafolha	14–15 Oct	9,081	49%	51%	–	2%
Ibope	12–14 Oct	3,010	49%	51%	–	2%
Vox Populi	11–12 Oct	2,000	51%	49%	–	2%
Datafolha	8–9 Oct	2,879	49%	51%	–	2%
Ibope	7–8 Oct	3,010	49%	51%	–	2%
Total votes
Vox Populi	25 Oct	2,000	48%	41%	10%	7%
Datafolha	24–25 Oct	19,318	47%	43%	10%	4%
Ibope	24–25 Oct	3,010	49%	43%	8%	6%
CNT/MDA	23–24 Oct	2,002	44.7%	45.3%	10.1%	0.6%
Datafolha	22–23 Oct	9,910	48%	42%	10%	6%
Datafolha	21 Oct	4,355	47%	43%	10%	4%
Ibope	20–22 Oct	3,010	49%	41%	10%	8%
Datafolha	20 Oct	4,389	46%	43%	11%	3%
Vox Populi	18–19 Oct	2,000	46%	43%	11%	3%
CNT/MDA	18–19 Oct	2,002	45.5%	44.5%	10.0%	1%
Datafolha	14–15 Oct	9,081	43%	45%	12%	2%
Ibope	12–14 Oct	3,010	43%	45%	12%	2%
Vox Populi	11–12 Oct	2,000	45%	44%	11%	1%
Datafolha	8–9 Oct	2,879	44%	46%	10%	2%
Ibope	7–8 Oct	3,010	44%	46%	10%	2%

== Results ==
=== President ===
Candidate	Running mate	Party	First round		Second round	
Candidate	Running mate	Party	Votes	%	Votes	%
Dilma Rousseff	Michel Temer (PMDB)	Workers' Party	43,267,668	41.59	54,501,118	51.64
Aécio Neves	Aloysio Nunes	Brazilian Social Democracy Party	34,897,211	33.55	51,041,155	48.36
Marina Silva	Beto Albuquerque	Brazilian Socialist Party	22,176,619	21.32		
Luciana Genro	Jorge Paz	Socialism and Liberty Party	1,612,186	1.55		
Everaldo Pereira	Leonardo Gadelha	Social Christian Party	780,513	0.75		
Eduardo Jorge	Célia Sacramento	Green Party	630,099	0.61		
Levy Fidelix	José Alves de Oliveira	Brazilian Labour Renewal Party	446,878	0.43		
José Maria de Almeida	Cláudia Durans	United Socialist Workers' Party	91,209	0.09		
José Maria Eymael	Roberto Lopes	Christian Social Democratic Party	61,250	0.06		
Mauro Iasi	Sofia Manzano	Brazilian Communist Party	47,845	0.05		
Rui Costa Pimenta	Ricardo Machado	Workers' Cause Party	12,324	0.01		
Total			104,023,802	100.00	105,542,273	100.00
Valid votes			104,023,802	90.36	105,542,273	93.66
Invalid/blank votes			11,099,081	9.64	7,141,606	6.34
Total votes			115,122,883	100.00	112,683,879	100.00
Registered voters/turnout			142,822,046	80.61	142,822,046	78.90
Source: Election Resources

==== Voter demographics ====
Second round results Municipalities won by Dilma Rousseff: Municipalities won by Aécio Neves:

Demographic subgroup	Rousseff	Neves	% of total vote
Total vote	52	48	100
Gender
Men	51	49	48
Women	54	46	52
Age
16–24 years old	50	50	16
25–34 years old	52	47	23
35–44 years old	55	45	20
45–59 years old	53	47	24
60 and older	50	50	17
Education
Less than high school	61	39	36
High school diploma	51	49	43
Bachelor's degree or more	39	61	21
Family income
Under 2x min wage	63	37	38
2-5x min wage	50	50	39
5-10x min wage	40	60	13
Over 10x min wage	35	65	10
Region
Southeast	44	56	44
South	45	55	15
Northeast	70	30	27
Central-West	44	56	7
North	58	42	7
Source: Datafolha

=== Chamber of Deputies ===
Party	Votes	%	Seats	+/–
Workers' Party	13,554,166	13.94	69	–19
Brazilian Social Democracy Party	11,073,631	11.39	54	+1
Brazilian Democratic Movement Party	10,791,949	11.10	66	–13
Progressive Party	6,429,791	6.61	38	–5
Brazilian Socialist Party	6,267,878	6.44	34	0
Social Democratic Party	5,967,953	6.14	36	New
Party of the Republic	5,635,519	5.79	34	–7
Brazilian Republican Party	4,423,993	4.55	21	+13
Democrats	4,085,487	4.20	21	–21
Brazilian Labour Party	3,914,193	4.02	25	+4
Democratic Labour Party	3,469,168	3.57	19	–9
Solidariedade	2,689,701	2.77	15	New
Social Christian Party	2,520,421	2.59	13	–5
Green Party	2,004,464	2.06	8	–7
Republican Party of the Social Order	1,977,117	2.03	11	New
Popular Socialist Party	1,955,689	2.01	10	–2
Communist Party of Brazil	1,913,015	1.97	10	–5
Socialism and Liberty Party	1,745,470	1.79	5	+2
Humanist Party of Solidarity	926,664	0.95	5	+3
Labour Party of Brazil	812,497	0.84	1	–2
Social Liberal Party	808,710	0.83	1	0
Progressive Republican Party	724,825	0.75	3	+1
National Labour Party	723,182	0.74	4	+4
National Ecologic Party	667,983	0.69	2	New
Christian Social Democratic Party	509,936	0.52	2	+2
Party of National Mobilization	467,777	0.48	3	–1
Brazilian Labour Renewal Party	454,190	0.47	1	–1
Christian Labour Party	338,117	0.35	2	+1
United Socialist Workers' Party	188,473	0.19	0	0
Free Fatherland Party	141,254	0.15	0	New
Brazilian Communist Party	66,979	0.07	0	0
Workers' Cause Party	12,969	0.01	0	0
Total	97,263,161	100.00	513	0
Valid votes	97,263,161	84.65		
Invalid votes	7,536,833	6.56		
Blank votes	10,106,586	8.80		
Total votes	114,906,580	100.00		
Registered voters/turnout	142,384,193	80.70		
Source: Election Resources

=== Senate ===
Party	Votes	%	Seats		
Party	Votes	%	Won	Total	+/–
Brazilian Social Democracy Party	23,880,078	26.73	4	10	–1
Workers' Party	15,155,818	16.96	2	12	–3
Brazilian Democratic Movement Party	12,129,969	13.58	5	18	–1
Brazilian Socialist Party	12,123,194	13.57	3	7	+4
Social Democratic Party	7,147,245	8.00	2	3	New
Democratic Labour Party	3,609,643	4.04	4	8	+4
Democrats	3,515,426	3.93	3	5	–1
Brazilian Labour Party	2,803,999	3.14	2	3	–3
Republican Party of the Social Order	2,234,132	2.50	0	1	New
Progressive Party	1,931,738	2.16	1	5	0
Socialism and Liberty Party	1,045,275	1.17	0	1	–1
Communist Party of Brazil	803,144	0.90	0	1	–1
Green Party	723,576	0.81	0	1	+1
Party of the Republic	696,462	0.78	1	4	0
Solidarity	370,507	0.41	0	1	New
United Socialist Workers' Party	355,585	0.40	0	0	0
Brazilian Republican Party	301,162	0.34	0	1	0
Progressive Republican Party	170,257	0.19	0	0	0
Brazilian Communist Party	68,199	0.08	0	0	0
National Ecologic Party	65,597	0.07	0	0	New
Party of National Mobilization	57,911	0.06	0	0	–1
Brazilian Labour Renewal Party	38,429	0.04	0	0	0
Christian Social Democratic Party	31,011	0.03	0	0	0
Free Fatherland Party	29,366	0.03	0	0	New
Christian Labour Party	21,993	0.02	0	0	0
Social Christian Party	19,286	0.02	0	0	–1
Labour Party of Brazil	11,300	0.01	0	0	0
Workers' Cause Party	8,561	0.01	0	0	0
National Labour Party	2,741	0.00	0	0	0
Total	89,351,604	100.00	27	81	0
Valid votes	89,351,604	77.76			
Invalid votes	14,153,698	12.32			
Blank votes	11,401,280	9.92			
Total votes	114,906,582	100.00			
Registered voters/turnout	142,384,193	80.70			
Source: Election Resources

== Aftermath ==
The small difference between the votes of both candidates, around 3.5 million votes, made this election to be the most disputed since redemocratization. Dilma was sworn in as the 36th president of Brazil on 1 January 2015 in a ceremony conducted by Renan Calheiros in the floor of the Chamber of Deputies.

=== International reaction ===
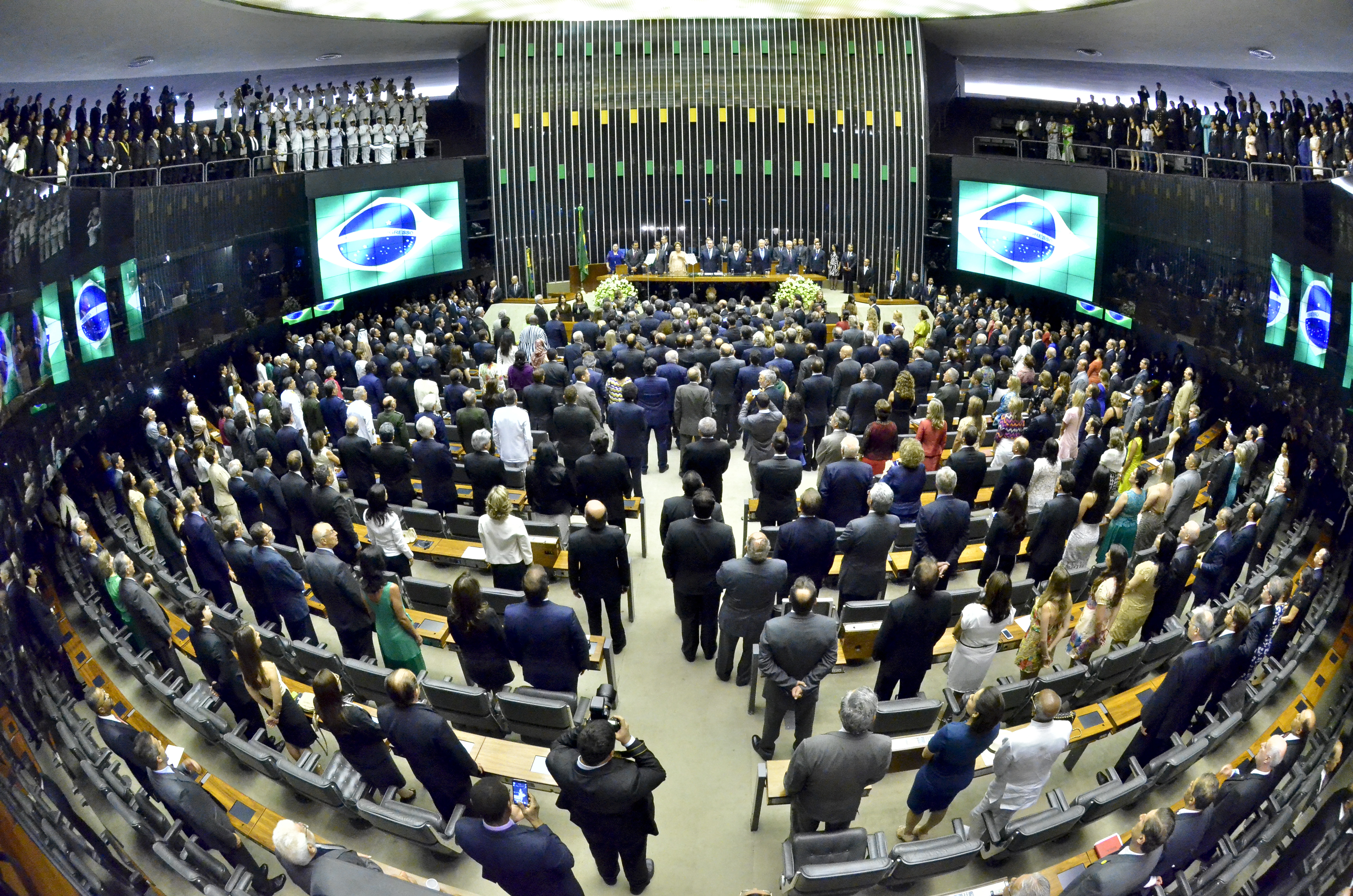
Swearing-in ceremony of Dilma Rousseff, in 2015.

Presidents and representatives of different countries saluted the victory of Dilma Rousseff on 26 October over Aécio Neves.

- Argentina - Argentinian President Cristina Kirchner used her social media to salute Dilma. In a letter directed to Dilma and published in her Facebook page, Kirchner celebrated the results of the election in Brazil which, according to her, "shows the Brazilian society reaffirming their unshakable commitment with a political project that guarantees economic growth with social inclusion". Also stated that the mutual cooperation between Brazil and Argentina would increase from this moment.
- Bolivia - Bolivian President Evo Morales highlighted president Dilma's victory and stated that it "represents the model of change" in Brazil and in the Latin America. "Bolivia salutes the triumph of partner Dilma. We greet the continuity of the model of change in Brazil and the region", declared the leader in Shinahota, according to the state agency ABI.
- El Salvador - Salvadoran President Salvador Sánchez Cerén congratulated Dilma for her victory through his Twitter account.
- Ecuador - Ecuadorian President Rafael Correa celebrated, in his Twitter account, the "amazing victory of Dilma in Brazil". "We salute the president of Brazil, Dilma Rousseff, for her today's electoral victory", commented the Ecuatorial chancellor, Ricardo Patiño, also using the social network.
- France - The French government greeted president Rousseff for her reelection. "France wishes to work in strict cooperation with the Brazilian government to boost the strategic partnership between both countries in all areas", declared the French Ministry of Foreign Affairs. The French government also remembered that the relationship with Brazil was centered in three priorities: reinforce the political dialogue about climate changes, increase commercial and investment connections, and dynamize the cooperation of university exchange programs.
- Germany - German Chancellor Angela Merkel sent a telegram congratulating Dilma Rousseff for her reelection, expressing in text the possibility to keep the ties between both countries. "I congratulate you for the reelection as president of Brazil. I am glad that we can keep our political and economic cooperation. In face of the challenges that both nations are facing, only together and as partners, we can overcome them", stated Merkel.
- Russia - Russian President Vladimir Putin also congratulated Dilma for her reelection and stated "the victory in the polls is a proof of the popular support for her politics". In his telegram, Putin expressed that "the results of the voting showed that the people supports Dilma Rousseff's politics and looks for the economic development of the country and the strengthening of its international positions". The Russian president also rated as very good the attention Dilma gives to the "strengthening of the Russian-Brazilian strategic association".
- United States - American President Barack Obama congratulated Dilma and requested that the ties with Brazil should be strengthened, which, according to Obama, it was "an important ally of the United States". The American president also expressed interest to schedule a meeting to discuss the possibility to "reinforce the collaboration for the world security and the respect to human rights, as well as deepen the bilateral cooperation in areas like education, energy and, mostly, trade".
- Venezuela - Venezuelan President Nicolás Maduro highlighted Dilma's victory in his official Twitter account, shortly after the announce of the first results. "Victory of Dilma in Brazil. Victory of the People. Victory of Lula and his legacy. Victory of the people of Latin America and Caribbean", stated in his account.

Besides chiefs of state, the international press also reverberated Dilma's victory. The New York Times in the United States highlighted the reelection on the front page of the newspaper and states that the victory "endors[es] a leftist leader who has achieved important gains in reducing poverty and keeping unemployment low"; Argentine El Clarín highlighted on the front page that Dilma won by a narrow margin "at the end of a tough campaign, full of denounced and mutual accusations"; for the United Kingdom Financial Times, "Dilma now faces the task of uniting a country divided by the most aggressive campaign of recent times, to resurrect a creeping economy and pacify hostile markets"; Venezuelan El Universal highlighted on its first page Aécio Neves' reaction, who acknowledged his defeated and highlighted in his speech that "the priority now is to unite Brazil"; French Le Monde mentioned the defeat in São Paulo, main electoral college of the country, but "compensated by the victory in Minas Gerais, the second largest electoral college and Aécio Neves' political fief"; Spanish El País brings as a highlight an article signed by journalist Juan Arais, from Rio de Janeiro, entitled "The political change in Brazil will have to wait".

=== Crisis ===
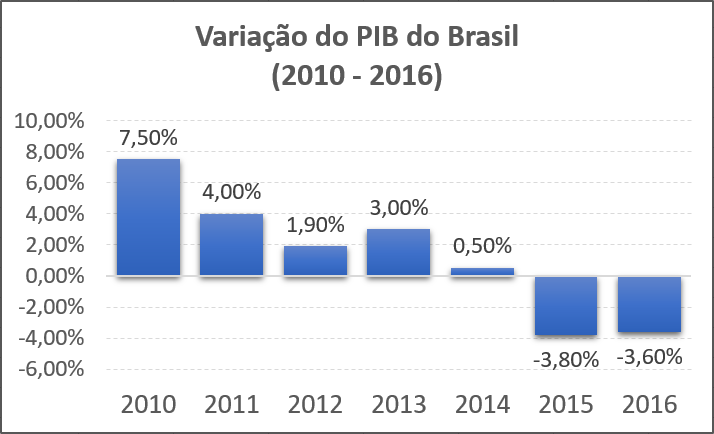
Percentage change of Brazil's gross domestic product (GDP), according to Brazilian Institute of Geography and Statistics. Notice the low growth in 2014 and severe drops in the following years.

From 2014 and on, right after the results of the elections, an economic crisis began in Brazil, having as a consequence the strong economic recession, succeeded by a retreat of the Gross Domestic Product (GDP) for 2 consecutive years. The economy reduced in around 3.8% in 2015 and 3.6% in 2016. The crisis also brought a high level of unemployment, which reached its peak in March 2017, with a rate of 13.7%, representing more than 14 million Brazilians unemployed.

In 2016, the effects of the economic crisis were widely felt by the population, who needed to adapt their bills to the financial reality. According to research by the Industry National Confederation (CNI) in that year, almost half of those interviewed (48%) had begun to use more public transportation, and 34% did not have health insurance anymore. The deepening of the crisis caused 14% of the families to change their children's schools from private to public, with a percentage higher than the one verified in 2012 and 2013, before the crisis. Besides that, consumers changed to buying cheaper products (78%), waited for sales to buy higher value goods (80%) and saved more money for emergencies (78%).

In the first quarter of 2017, GDP rose 1%, being the first growth after 8 consecutive quarter drops. Minister of Finance Henrique Meirelles said that, in that moment, the country "left the largest recession of the century".

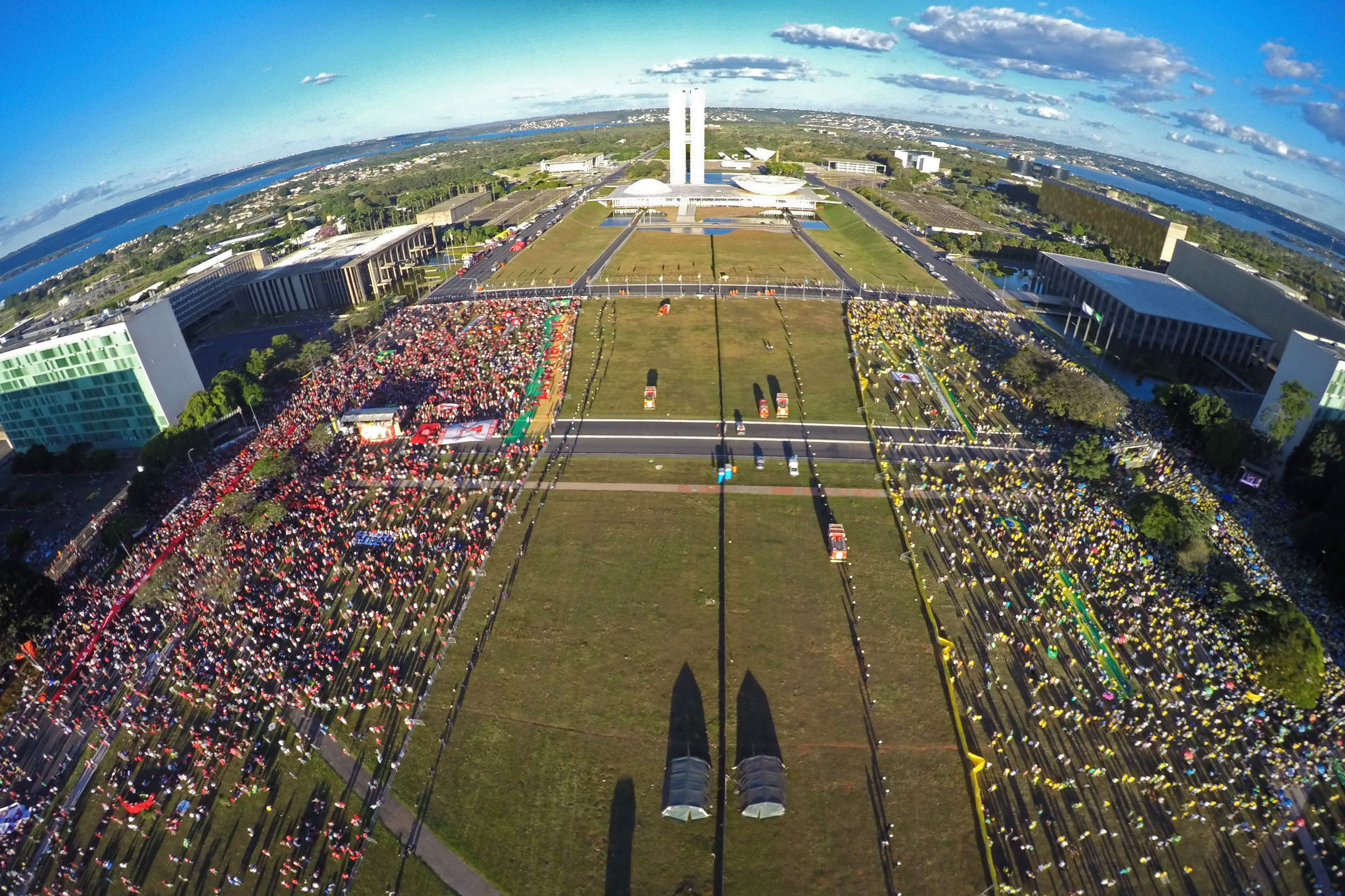
Protests in the Ministries Terrace of groups in favor and against the Impeachment of Dilma Rousseff

A political crisis began on 17 March 2014, when the Federal Police of Brazil began a series of investigations which would be known as Operation Car Wash, initially investigating a corruption scheme and money laundry of billions of reais involving many politicians of the largest parties of the country. The operation had direct impact in the country politics, contributing for the impopularity of Dilma's administration, just as, posteriorly, for Temer's administration, as long as many of their ministers and allies were targeted of the operation, such as Geddel Vieira Lima and Romero Jucá. The task force responsible for the operation was disbanded on February 1, 2021, and integrated into the Special Task Force to Combat Organized Crime (Portuguese: Grupo de Atuação Especial de Combate ao Crime Organizado, abbreviated GAECO), a division of Brazil's Federal Public Ministry (Portuguese: Ministério Público Federal, abbreviated MPF). This merger concluded the operation, which comprised 80 phases and generated multiple offshoots within and beyond Brazil.

The protests against Dilma Rousseff government, due to the results of Operation Car Wash, occurred in many regions of Brazil, having as one of the main goals the impeachment of the president. The movement brought together millions of people on 15 March, 12 April, 16 August and 13 December 2015 and, according to some estimates, were the largest popular mobilizations in the country. The protest of 13 March 2016 was considered the largest political act in the history of Brazil and occurred over all the country, overcoming also Diretas Já, which occurred during the transition period from the Military Dictatorship to the redemocratization.

==== Rousseff's impeachment ====
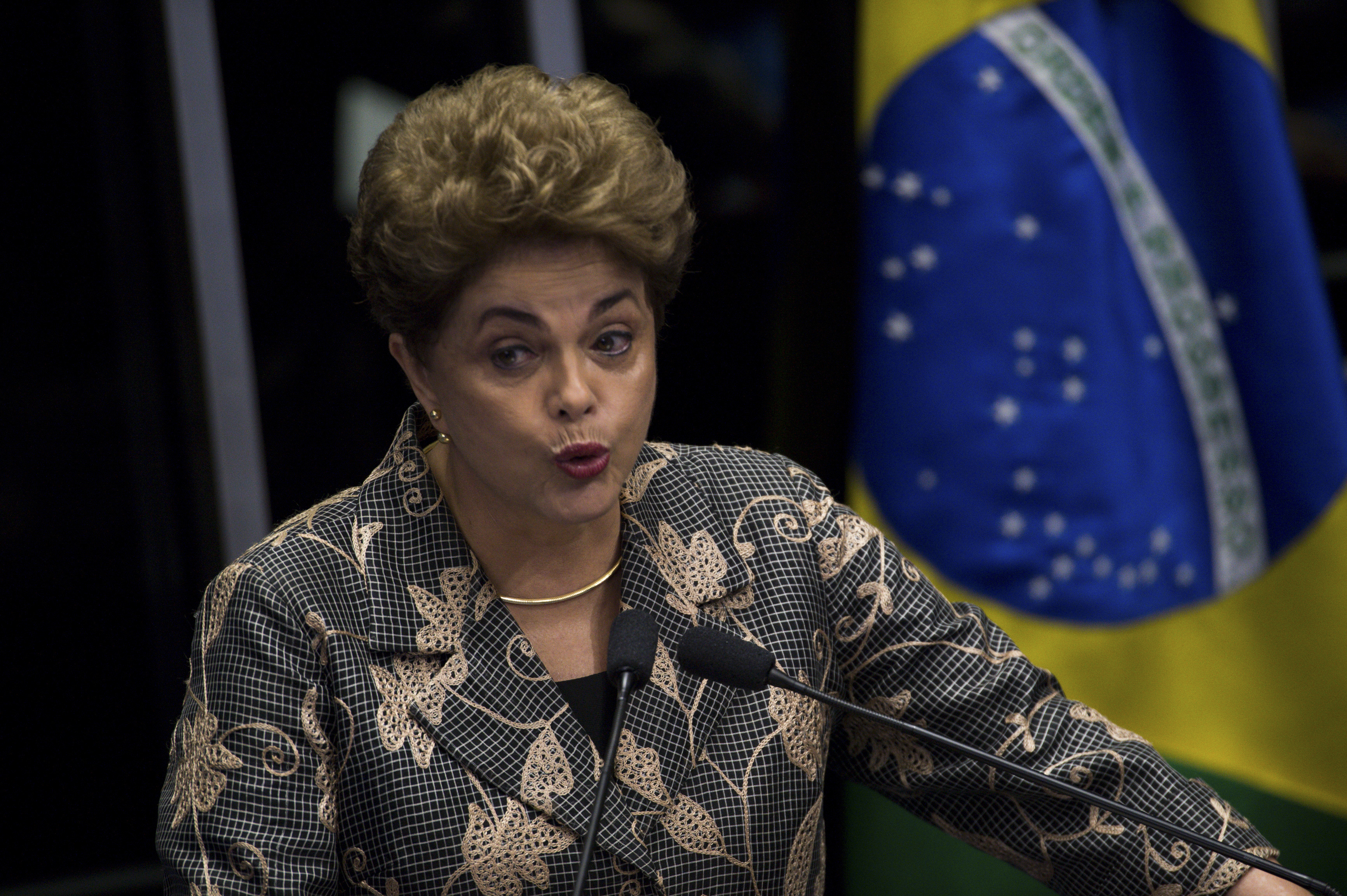
Dilma gives her defence speech during the impeachment session that ended in her removal from office.

On 2 December 2015, president of Chamber of Deputies, Eduardo Cunha, accepted one of the seven impeachment requests against Dilma, which was registered by jurists Hélio Bicudo, Miguel Reale Júnior and Janaína Paschoal, and delivered to Cunha 2 months before. In the original request, were included denounces of decrees signed by the president in 2015, to release R$ 2.5 billions (US$ 0.75 billion), without Congress approval, nor prevision on budget. This operation is known as fiscal pedaling (Pedalada fiscal), and it's characterized as administrative misconduct.

The acceptance of the impeachment request was considered by part of the press as a retaliation against the president's party, which deputies announced on that same day that they would vote against Cunha in the Chamber's Ethics Committee, where he was investigated for a supposed participation in the scheme denounced in Operation Car Wash. Cunha denied any "bargain" relation with the government, stating that "the decision to accept the impeachment is factual, is concrete, has clear tipification", but kept attributing to president Rousseff responsibilities about the investigations against him. According to Luiz Inácio Lula da Silva, Dilma didn't have "the will of doing politics" and didn't have any meeting with party caucuses to try to repeal the impeachment.

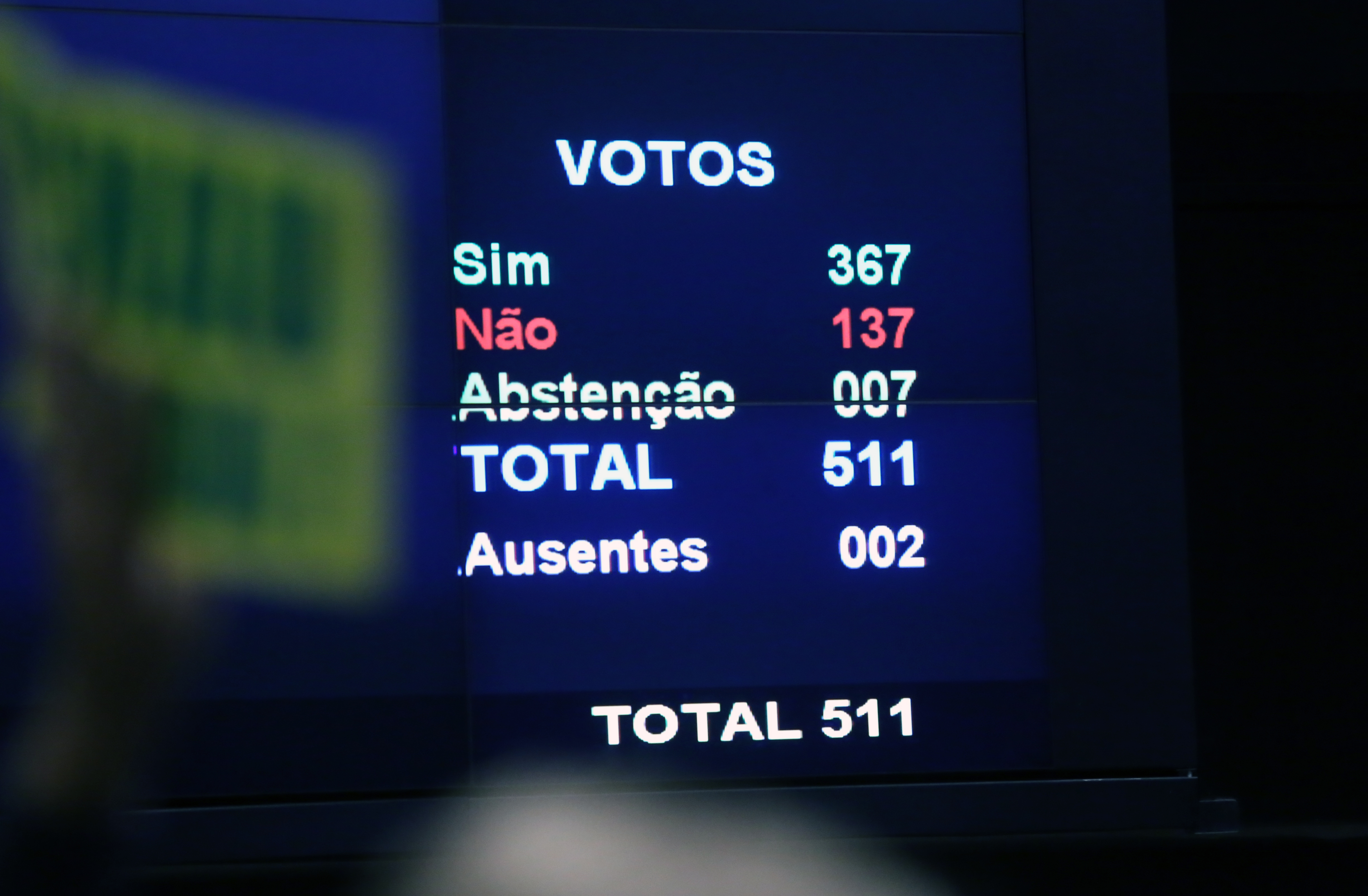
Result of the voting of the acceptance of the impeachment process in the Chamber of Deputies, which took the process to the Federal Senate.

Due to the parliamentary recess and the sues filed in the Supreme Federal Court with the objective to decide formally the rite of the process only on 17 March 2016, the Chamber elected, with open voting, the 65 members of the Special Committee which analyzed the impeachment request against Dilma Rousseff. There were 433 votes in favor of the committee membership and 1 against. On 11 April, the Special Committee, with 38 votes in favor and 27 against, approved the report, which defended the admissibility of the process. The report, made by deputy Jovair Arantes (PTB-GO), went for voting in the floor of the Chamber. On 17 April 2016, a Sunday, the Chamber of Deputies, with 367 votes in favor, 137 against, besides 7 abstentions and 2 absences, impeached Rousseff and authorized the Federal Senate to install the process against the president.

On 6 May 2016, the Senate Impeachment Special Committee approved, with 15 votes in favor and 5 against, the report of senator Antônio Anastasia (PSDB-MG), in favor of the impeachment. On 11 May, Justice Teori Zavascki denied a government request to null the process. With the decision, the Senate kept the voting that would decide the suspension of Rousseff from office.

On 12 May 2016, with 55 favorable votes, 22 contrary and 2 absences, the Federal Senate authorized the opening of the impeachment process, and determined her suspension from the Presidency of the Republic for up to 180 days. On 31 August, the Federal Senate, with a voting of 61 to 20, removed Rousseff from office of President, but kept her political rights. With the impeachment, Michel Temer, who was Vice President of Brazil and Acting President until that moment, took office as president until the end of the term.

== See also ==
- Odebrecht
- Operation Car Wash
- Sergio Moro
- Michel Temer
- Petrobras
- BTG Pactual
- Dilma Rousseff
- André Esteves
- Eduardo Cunha
