= Marina Silva =

Brazilian environmentalist and politician (born 1958)

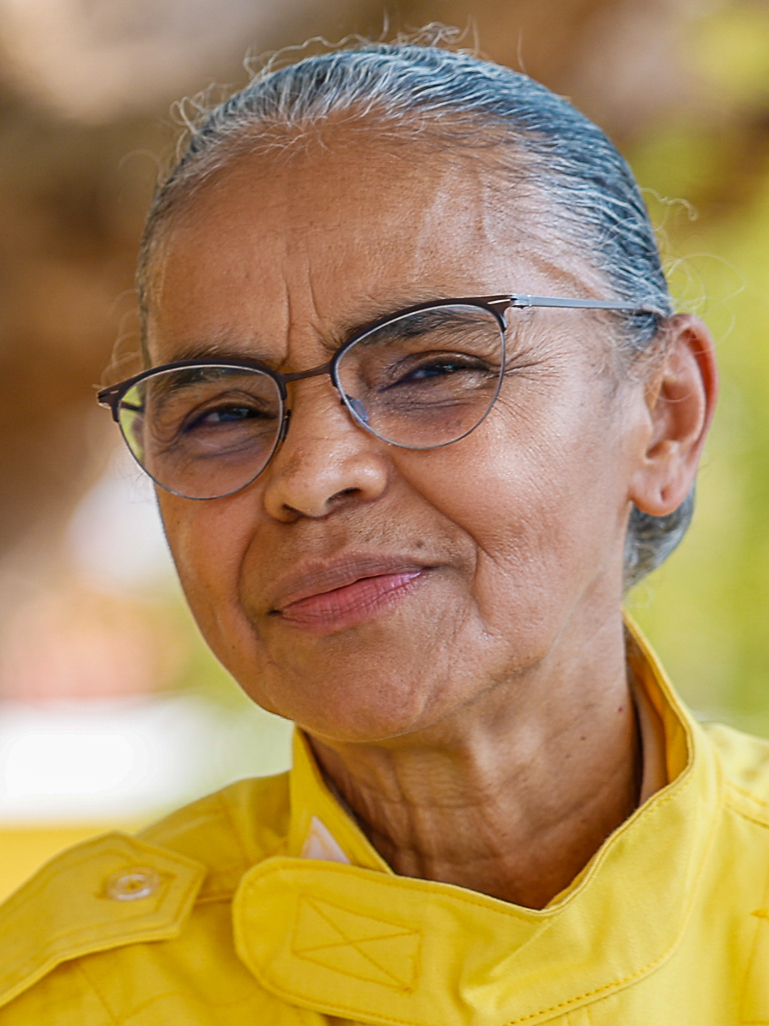
- Silva in 2024

Minister of the Environment and Climate Change (Note: Minister of the Environment (2003–2008).)
- In office 1 January 2023 – 31 March 2026
- President: Luiz Inácio Lula da Silva
- Preceded by: Joaquim Leite
- Succeeded by: João Paulo Capobianco
- In office 1 January 2003 – 13 May 2008
- President: Luiz Inácio Lula da Silva
- Preceded by: José Carlos Carvalho
- Succeeded by: Carlos Minc

Spokesperson of the Sustainability Network
- In office 22 September 2015 – 8 April 2018 Serving with Zé Gustavo
- Preceded by: Party established
- Succeeded by: Pedro Ivo Batista; Laís Garcia

Senator for Acre
- In office 15 May 2008 – 1 February 2011
- Preceded by: Sibá Machado
- Succeeded by: Jorge Viana
- In office 1 February 1995 – 2 February 2003
- Preceded by: Aluísio Bezerra
- Succeeded by: Sibá Machado

Member of the Chamber of Deputies
- Incumbent
- Assumed office 1 February 2023
- Constituency: São Paulo

State Deputy of Acre
- In office 1 February 1991 – 1 February 1995
- Constituency: At-large

Councillor of Rio Branco
- In office 1 January 1989 – 1 February 1991
- Constituency: At-large

Personal details
- Born: Maria Osmarina da Silva; 8 February 1958 (age 68) Rio Branco, Acre, Brazil
- Party: REDE (2015–present)
- Other political affiliations: PT (1986–2008); PV (2008–2011); PSB (2013–2015)
- Spouse: Fábio Vaz de Lima (m. 1986)
- Children: 4
- Education: Federal University of Acre
- Website: www.marinasilva.org.br

Maria Osmarina Marina da Silva Vaz de Lima (born Maria Osmarina da Silva; 8 February 1958), known as Marina Silva, is a Brazilian politician and environmentalist, currently serving as Minister of the Environment and Climate Change, a position she previously held from 2003 to 2008. She is the founder and former spokeswoman of the Sustainability Network (REDE). A former senator for the state of Acre between 1995 and 2011, she has been a federal deputy for the state of São Paulo since 2023. She ran unsuccessfully for president in 2010, 2014 and 2018.

Silva was a member of the PT until 2009, and served as a senator before becoming Minister of the Environment in 2003. She ran for president in the 2010 Brazilian elections as the candidate for the Green Party, coming in 3rd with 19% of the first-round vote. In April 2014, Eduardo Campos announced his candidacy for the 2014 presidential election, naming Marina Silva as his vice presidential candidate. After Campos's death in a plane crash on August, she was selected to run as the Socialist Party's candidate for the presidency, winning 21% of the vote and coming in 3rd. She again ran for president in the 2018 election, this time as the nominee for the Sustainability Network, finishing in 8th place with 1% of the vote.

Silva has won a number of awards from US and international organizations in recognition of her environmental activism. In 2010, she, along with Cécile Duflot, Monica Frassoni, Elizabeth May and Renate Künast, were named by Foreign Policy magazine to its list of top global thinkers for taking Green mainstream. She was one of eight people chosen to carry the Olympic flag for the opening ceremonies of the 2012 London Summer Olympics.

== Early life ==
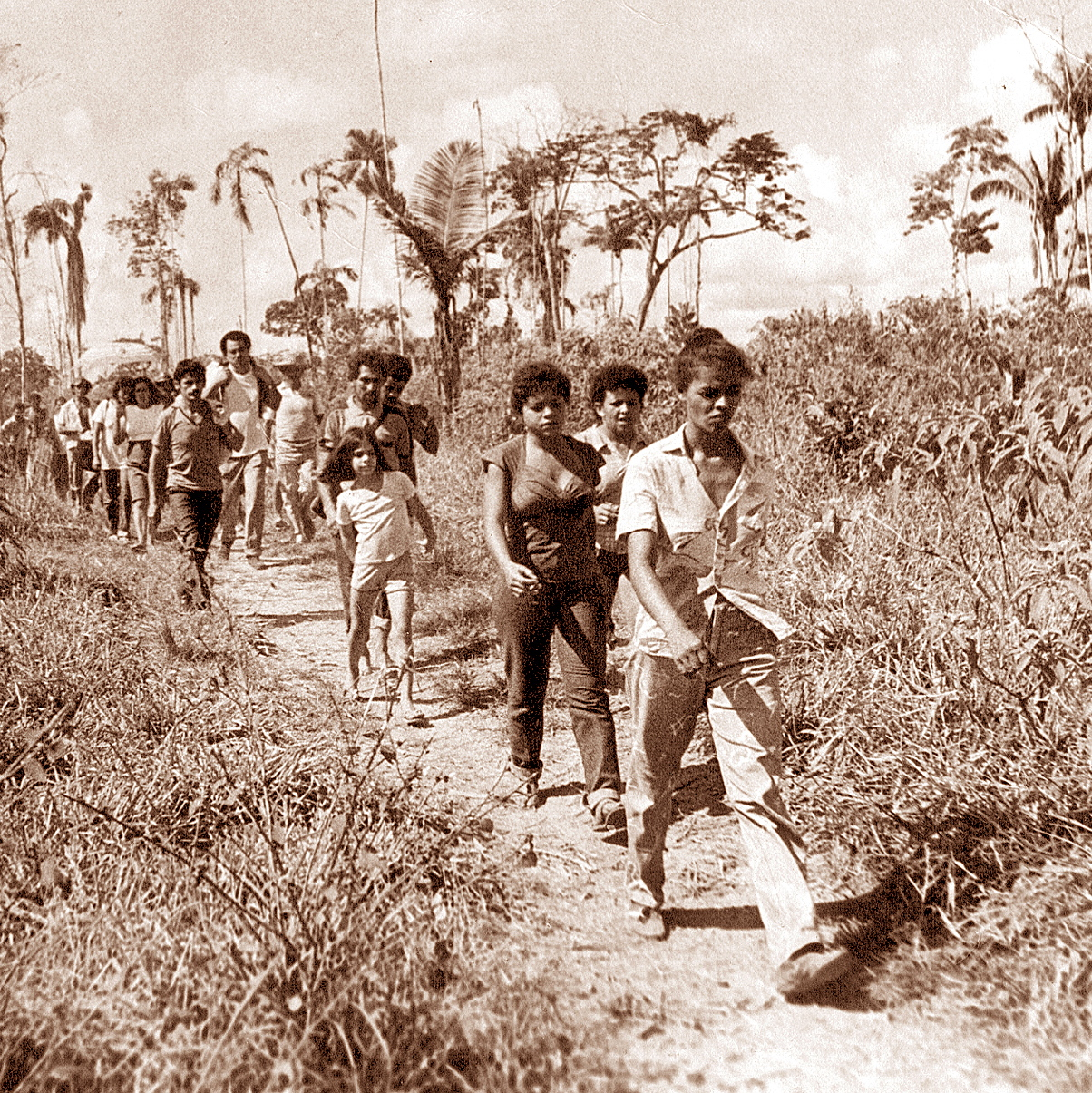
Marina Silva in Xapuri, Acre

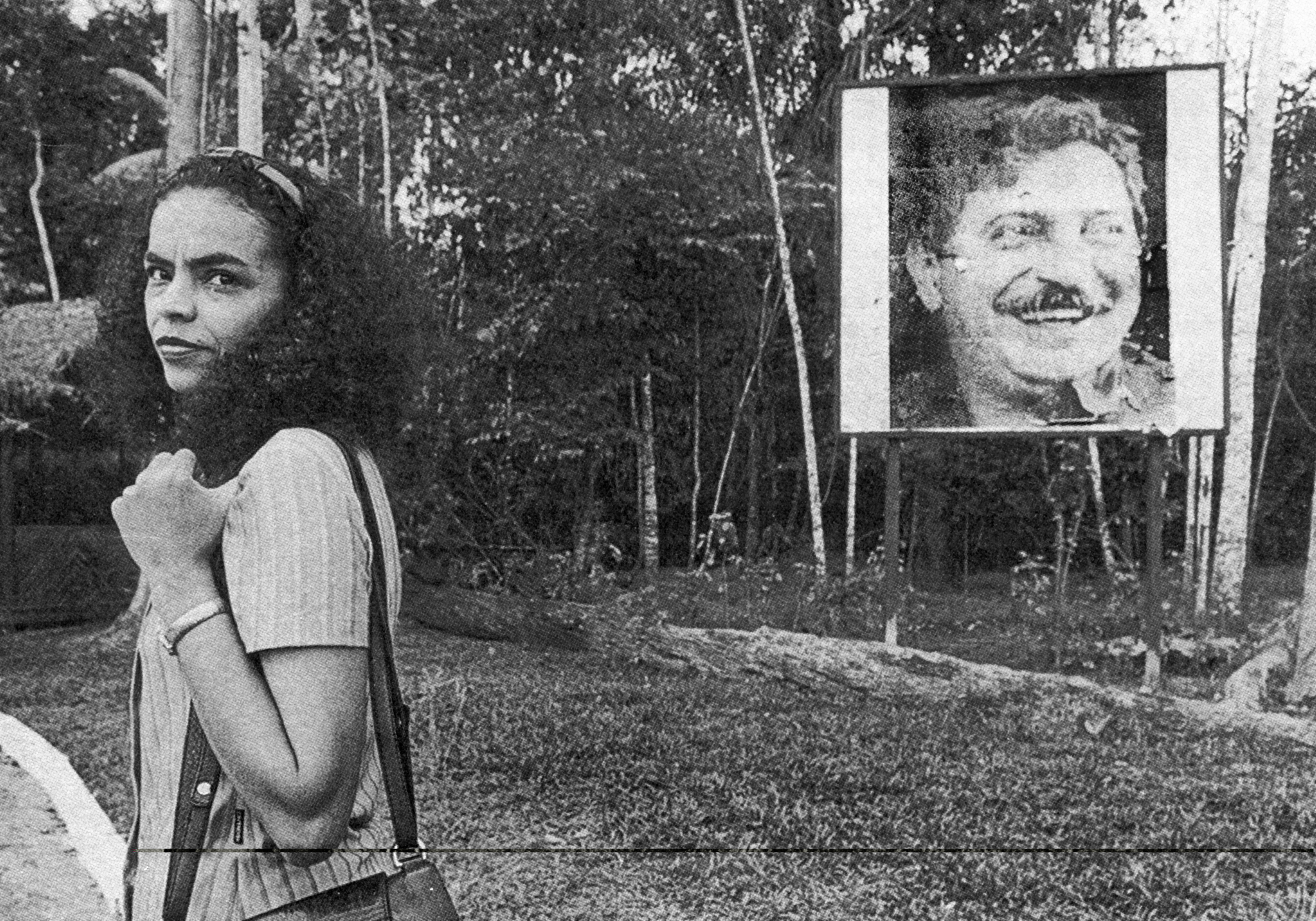
Silva in the Amazon rainforest, Acre, with a picture of Chico Mendes in the background

Marina Silva was born Maria Osmarina da Silva in the small village of Breu Velho, 70 km outside Rio Branco, Acre. Silva is a descendant of Portuguese and black African ancestors in both her maternal and paternal lines. She was one of eleven children in a community of rubber tappers on the Bagaço rubber tree plantation (Portuguese Seringal Bagaço), in the western state of Acre. Growing up, she survived five bouts of malaria in addition to cases of hepatitis and metal poisoning.

At age 16, young Marina moved to the state capital, Rio Branco, to study and receive treatment for hepatitis. She was taken in by nuns in a convent and received a Catholic education. There, she became the first person in her family to learn to read and write. After leaving the convent, she went to work as a housemaid in exchange for lodging. She completed her undergraduate degree in history from the Federal University of Acre at 26 and became increasingly politically active. In 1984 Silva helped create Acre's first workers' union.

== Early career ==
She led demonstrations called empates with Chico Mendes to warn against deforestation and the outplacement of forest communities from their traditional locations.

She helped Chico Mendes to lead the trade union movement, being elected as councillor of Rio Branco in 1988 for her first mandate in a public office.

=== Senate ===
In 1994, Silva was the first rubber tapper ever elected to the Federal Senate. As a native Amazonian and a senator, she built support for environmental protection of the reserves as well as for social justice and sustainable development in the Amazon region.

== First Lula government ==
A member of the Workers' Party, Marina Silva was appointed Environment Minister by Lula in his first term.

Also in 2005, Silva established her main lines of action for the next two years: social participation, sustainable development, creation of a National Environmental System, and an Integrated Environmental Policy. As she said, "Our ministry is new. It's only 13 years old, and it needs to be rebuilt".

=== Effect ===
Deforestation decreased by 59% from 2004 to 2007, during which she implemented an integrated government policy. The policy, also known as, "The Action Plan For The Prevention and Control of Deforestation in the Legal Amazon," It simultaneously fostered sustainable development, favored territorial zoning, and attached greater value to standing forests. It also incorporated elements from international conventions and documents. "All of this demonstrates that, when there is integrated planning and effort, it is truly possible to change the picture," Silva said in a statement to the Embassy of Brazil in London.

In 2005, Silva was confronted by Paulo Adário, coordinator of Greenpeace Brazil, over her environmental actions during her tenure in the ministry. Since her tenure began, Silva, together with the Federal Police, the Brazilian Army and the Federal Highway Police, performed 32 operations against illegal deforestation in the Amazon. However, Adário claims that his organization monitors the Amazon region and that only one such operation was conducted in October 2004, in the town of Itaituba, Pará. According to him, even if the 32 operations had actually been carried out, they would represent only half of what was anticipated in the National Plan to Combat Deforestation.

=== Resignation ===
She remained in office until 2008 and received several criticisms from entrepreneurs (mainly related to agribusiness) on account of delays in granting permits for projects with large environmental impact. In early 2005, however, she stated that she would not give up upon facing challenges even if they were imposed by the government to which she belonged, like the controversy over the São Francisco River Diversion Project, and the building of the BR-163 highway through the rainforest: "I don't admit defeat, just challenges that must be overcome".

Silva resigned from the Lula government in May 2008. She was replaced by Carlos Minc. Silva cited "the growing resistance found by our team in important sectors of the government and society" as the reason for her resignation. Tension between her and the rest of the Lula administration increased when President Lula da Silva chose Minister of Strategic Affairs Roberto Mangabeira Unger to coordinate a sustainable development plan for the Amazon, instead of her. She had become increasingly isolated in Lula da Silva's government due to her views against hydroelectric dams, biofuels, and genetically modified crops.

== 2010 presidential election ==
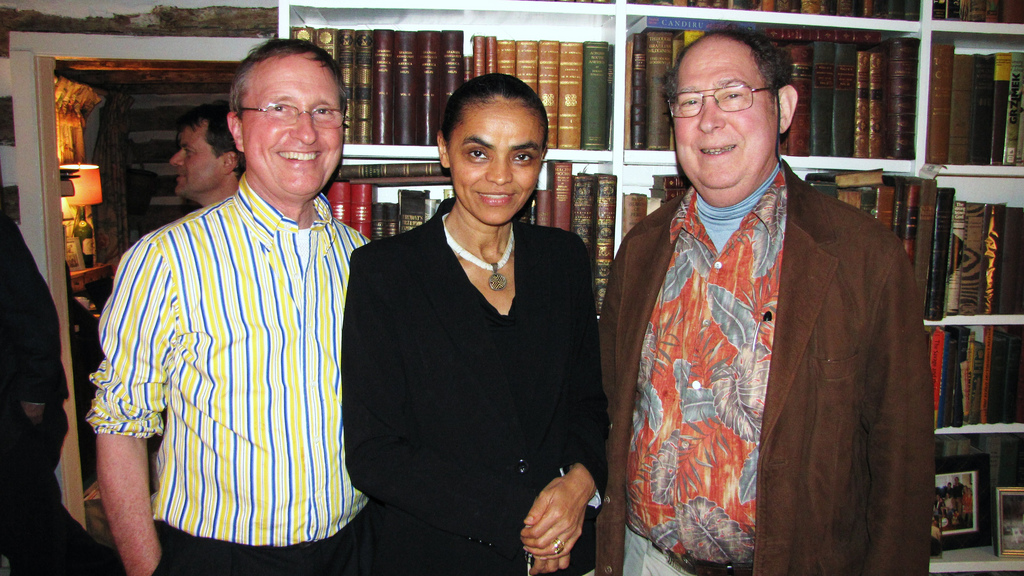
Silva (center) with Thomas Lovejoy and Stephen Schneider

=== Party switch ===
On 19 August 2009, Silva announced her switch from the Workers' Party to the Green Party, primarily in protest against the environmental policies endorsed by the PT. Confirming the expectations, Marina Silva launched her candidacy to the 2010 election under the Green Party ticket on 16 May 2010 in the city of Nova Iguaçu, state of Rio de Janeiro. Silva said she wanted to be "the first black woman of poor origin" to become president of Brazil.

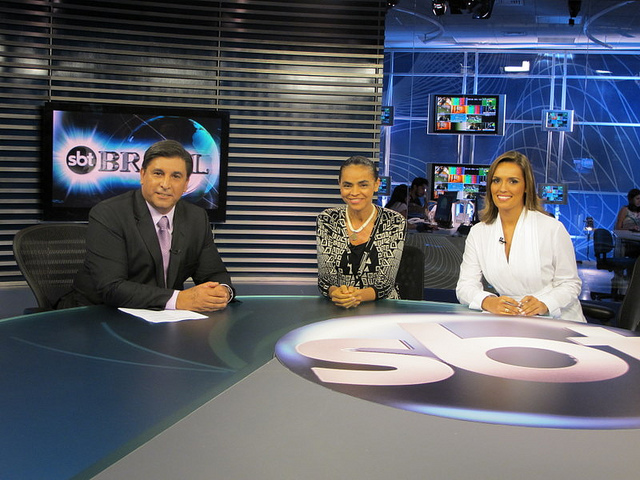
Silva on SBT

In her campaign, Silva defended the "exercise of citizen-based political principles and values", "education for the knowledge society", "economy applied to a sustainable society", "social protection, health, welfare and 3rd generation of social programs", "quality of life and safety for all Brazilians", and "strengthening of culture and diversity".

With her speech against the endemic corruption in Brazil (see A Privataria Tucana and Mensalão scandal), and in favor of sustainable development (with a due consideration to environmental issues), Silva managed to attract the middle class sectors disillusioned with the government of the Fernando Henrique Cardoso's PSDB and dissatisfied with the compensatory social policies of Lula da Silva's administration. As a result, she came to be seen as an alternative.

Marina Silva received strong support among young and highly educated voters. Running on a small-party ticket, she had about 1/20 of the TV time compared to the other two biggest party coalitions. Opinion polls notwithstanding, she received 19.4% of the votes cast. This number far exceeded earlier estimates (more than double), but not enough to join the runoff against Dilma Rousseff or José Serra.

== 2014 presidential election ==
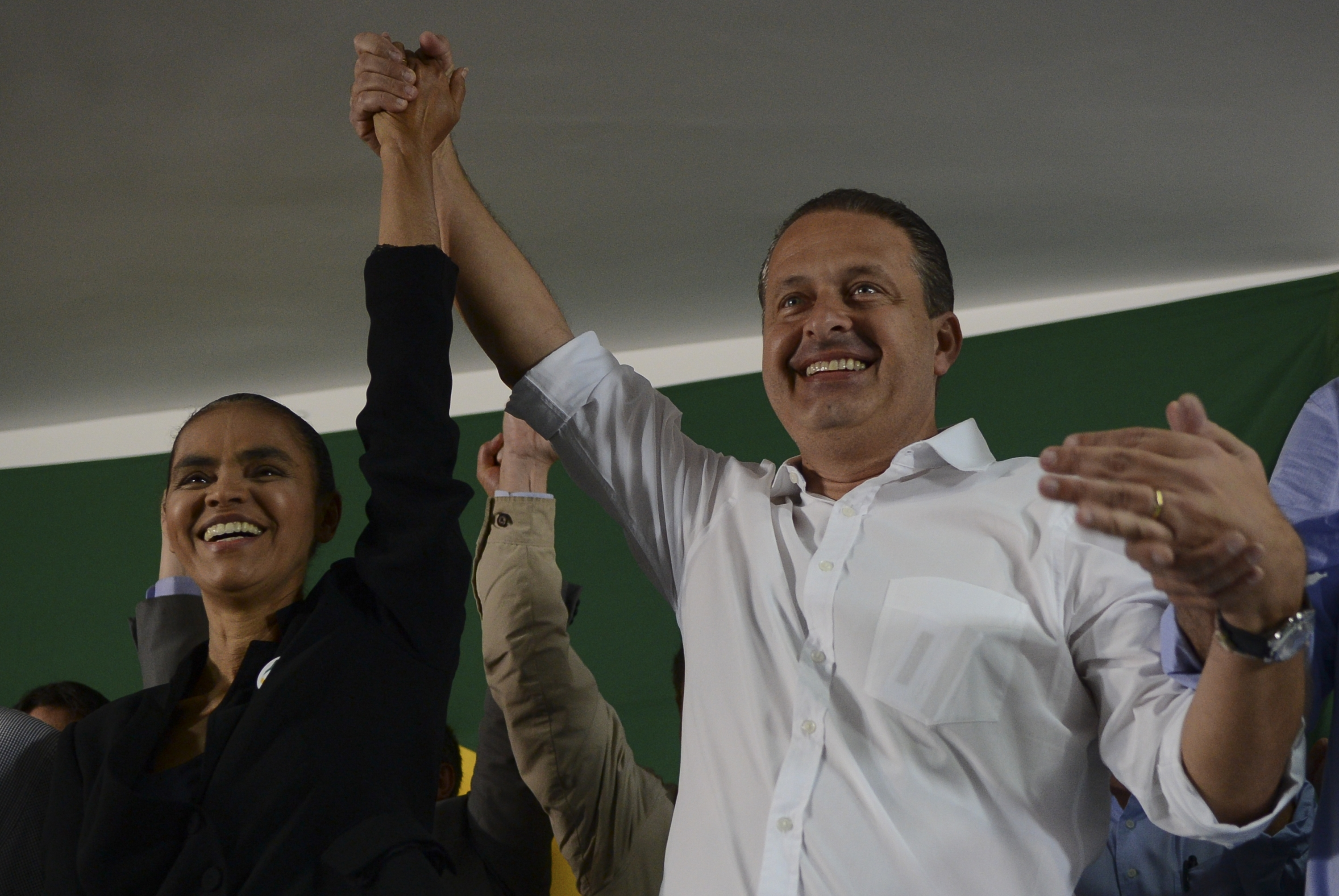
With Eduardo Campos.

In April 2014, Eduardo Campos announced his name for the October 2014 presidential election, naming Marina Silva as his candidate for vice president.

=== Sustainability Network ===
On 16 February 2013 a new party, Rede Sustentabilidade ("Sustainability Network"), was officially launched in Brasilia. According to its founders, the name to be used at the polls would be simply REDE ("NETWORK").

On 4 October 2013, the Superior Electoral Court blocked the party's creation, with there being insufficient signatures to register it. The following day, Marina announced her affiliation to the Brazilian Socialist Party.

=== Death of Campos ===
On Wednesday, 13 August 2014, Campos' private jet, with six others on board, crashed in bad weather as it was preparing to land in the coastal city of Santos, just south of São Paulo. After his death, Silva became the Brazilian Socialist Party's candidate for president of Brazil.

=== Campaign ===
Soon after taking the place of Campos in the bid, Marina polled 20% of the votes, 10% more than Campos was polling. She enjoyed strong support among young voters and evangelicals, but because of her pro-environmental stance she was largely distrusted by Brazil's powerful agribusiness sector. As an Evangelical Christian, she opposed abortion. On 30 August 2014, Silva generated considerable controversy when she renounced the party's support for same-sex marriage, which was supported by Campos and had been included in the party's manifesto, published a day earlier.

On Sunday, 5 October 2014, Silva received 21% of the vote in the first round of the election, to Rousseff's 41% and Neves's 34%. Although many observers had expected Silva to advance to a second round against Rousseff, Silva ultimately received a much lower share of the vote than most opinion polls had indicated in the lead-up to the election, and did not advance to the 26 October run-off. Some days after the election she endorsed Aecio Neves in the run-off against Dilma Rousseff.

== 2018 presidential election ==
On 4 August 2018, Marina Silva was officially nominated as the Sustainability Network's presidential candidate in the 2018 elections. Silva's running mate was Eduardo Jorge of the Green Party.

Until August 2018, Silva came in third in opinion polls for the presidency, behind Luiz Inácio Lula da Silva (before his candidacy was barred) and Jair Bolsonaro. However, she was later overtaken by Ciro Gomes, Fernando Haddad (Lula's replacement on the PT ticket), and Geraldo Alckmin, and was later polling fifth on average.

In the last few days before the election, her poll numbers dropped significantly, and in the end she polled around a single percentage point. She came out eight with 1.0% and 1,066,893 votes.

== Second Lula government ==
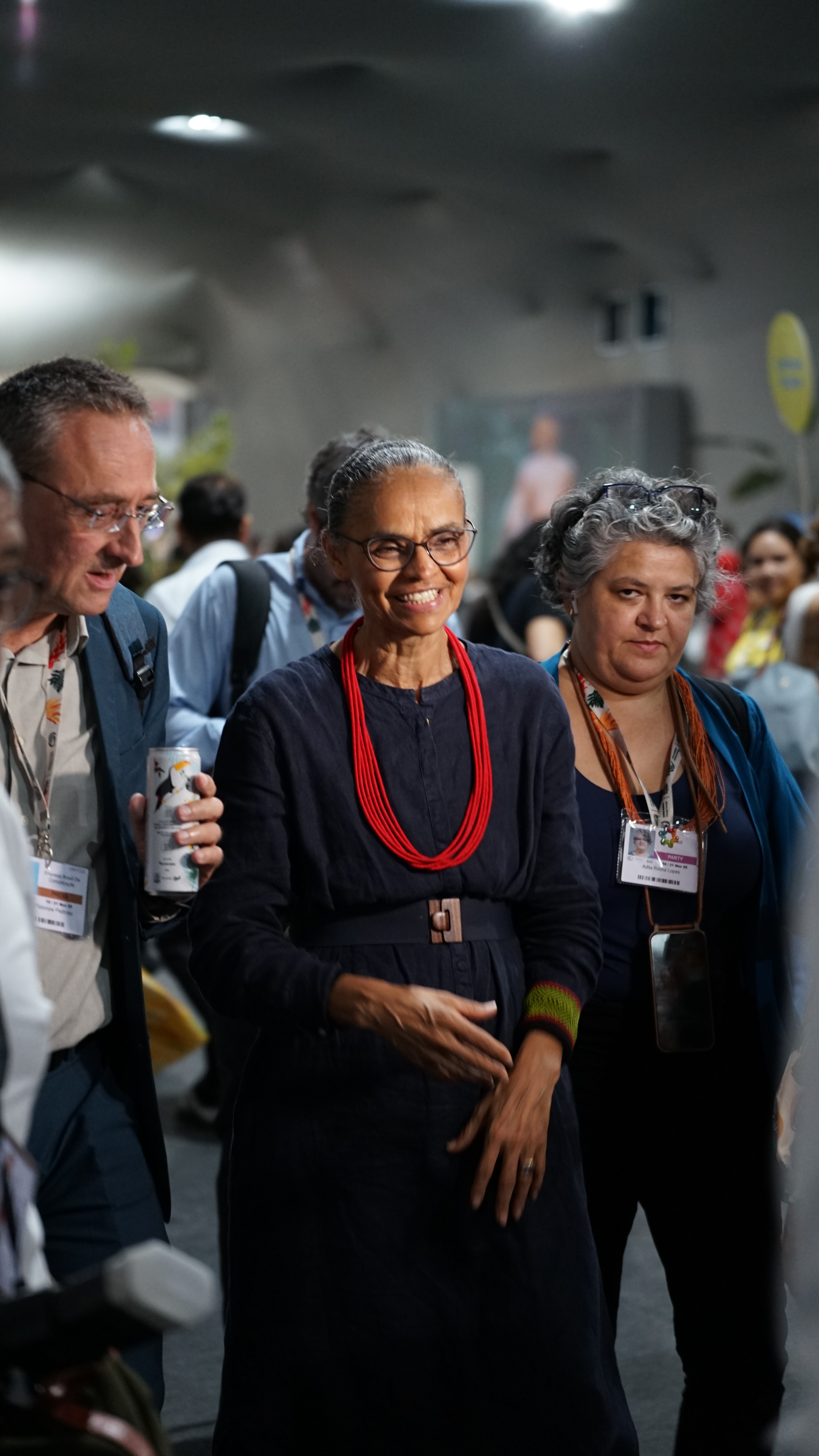
Silva at COP30, Belém, 2025

=== 2022 presidential election ===
On 12 September 2022 in an event open to the press, Silva publicly endorsed former President Luiz Inácio Lula da Silva for a third term as president ahead of the October general election, stating that it was necessary "to beat Bolsonaro and the evil seeds he is sowing in our society." Lula in turn vowed to enact a series of environmental proposals presented by Silva if he won the election. The turn of events has been described by commentators as a major step towards reconciliation between Silva and the Workers' Party.

=== Minister of the Environment (2023–present) ===
Following Lula's victory over Bolsonaro in the 31 October runoff, he announced Silva's return as Minister of the Environment on 29 December. In addition, Silva was elected to the Chamber of Deputies as a member of REDE for São Paulo. During her second term, deforestation rates in the Amazon have fallen to their lowest in over a decade through strengthened enforcement, Amazon Fund restoration and expanded protected areas. Silva has also advocated for zero deforestation by 2030 and shaped Brazil's COP30 position on forest finance and indigenous inclusion.

She stepped down from President Luiz Inácio Lula da Silva’s cabinet to launch a campaign for Congress. During her tenure, she oversaw environmental enforcement that cut Amazon deforestation by more than 50 percent. Time magazine quoted her as saying, “When we took office, we had deforestation on an ascending curve that was out of control. We had to rebuild institutions, command and control organizations, and increase public funding.”

== Views ==
=== Political ===
Marina Silva is generally considered to be a centrist and an environmentalist. She has campaigned on an anti-corruption platform. She opposes Brazil's nuclear energy program, and wants to redistribute the nuclear energy funds toward solar and wind power. Furthermore, she wants to initiate a national plebiscite on investments in nuclear energy. She is in favor of imposing presidential term limits.

=== Religious ===
Since 1996, Silva has been a Pentecostal Christian in the Assemblies of God, the second largest Christian denomination in Brazil after the declining but still mainstream Roman Catholic Church. Nevertheless, during her 2010 election campaign, she was criticized by one of the main leaders of the Brazilian Assemblies of God, Pastor Silas Malafaia, after having proposed a referendum on abortion and the decriminalization of marijuana. According to Malafaia, Marina Silva should be "more courageous and consistent" in defense of her religious convictions.

== Honors ==
In 1996, Silva won the Goldman Environmental Prize for South & Central America. In 2007, the United Nations Environment Program named her one of the Champions of the Earth and the 2009 Sophie Prize. In December 2014, Marina Silva was elected by the British Financial Times newspaper as one of its Women of the Year. Silva is also a member of Washington, D.C.–based think tank, the Inter-American Dialogue.

=== 2012 Summer Olympics ===
The participation of Marina Silva as one of the eight invited flag-bearers to carry the Olympic flag at the opening of the 2012 London Summer Olympics surprised the Brazilian government representatives present at the ceremony. In the Brazilian press, headlines like "Marina steals Dilma's attention" appeared. Commenting on the event, Aldo Rebelo, Brazilian Sports Minister from the PT, said that Silva "always had good relations with the European aristocracy" and that it was the responsibility of the Royal House to choose who would participate in the event. The Olympic Committee said it was aware of Silva's work as an activist in defense of the rainforest, but denied any political motivations regarding the choice. About her participation in the ceremony, Silva compared it to the feeling she got when passing, aged 16, her literacy course: "it was the same kind of happiness."

== Electoral history ==
Year	Election	Party	Office	Coalition	Partners	Votes	Percentage	Result	Ref.
1986	State Elections of Acre	PT	Federal Deputy	None		2,507	2.33%	Lost	
1988	Municipal Elections of Rio Branco	PT	Councillor	None		2,518	?	Elected	
1990	State Elections of Acre	PT	State Deputy	Popular Front of Acre (PT, PDT, PCB, PCdoB)	None	3,331	2.53%	Elected	
1994	State Elections of Acre	PT	Senator	Popular Front of Acre (PT, PCdoB, PSB, PPS, PMN, PL, PV, PSTU)	Júlio Eduardo Pereira (PPS)	64,436	21.39%	Elected	
2002	State Elections of Acre	PT	Senator	Popular Front of Acre (PT, PL, PCdoB, PV, PMN, PSDC, PTdoB)	Sibá Machado (PT)	157,588	32.29%	Elected	
2010	Brazilian Presidential Election	PV	President	None	Guilherme Leal (PV)	19,636,359	19.33%	Lost	
2014	Brazilian Presidential Election	PSB	President	United for Brazil (PSB, PPS, PSL, PHS, PPL, PRP)	Beto Albuquerque (PSB)	22,176,619	21.32%	Lost	
2018	Brazilian Presidential Election	REDE	President	United to Transform Brazil (REDE, PV)	Eduardo Jorge (PV)	1,069,578	1.00%	Lost	
2022	State Elections of São Paulo	REDE	Federal Deputy	Together for São Paulo (Brazil of Hope (PT, PCdoB and PV), PSOL–REDE Federation (PSOL and REDE), PSB, Act)	None	237,526	1.00%	Elected	
2026	State Elections of São Paulo	REDE	Senator	Wake up São Paulo! (Brazil of Hope (PT, PCdoB and PV), PSB, PSOL–REDE Federation (PSOL and REDE), PDT)	Djalma Nery (PSOL)	7,862,400	18.13%	Lost	
2026	State Elections of São Paulo	REDE	Senator	Wake up São Paulo! (Brazil of Hope (PT, PCdoB and PV), PSB, PSOL–REDE Federation (PSOL and REDE), PDT)	Antônio Neto (PDT)	7,862,400	18.13%	Lost	

== Notes ==
Political offices
Preceded by José Carlos Carvalho	Minister of the Environment; 2003–2008	Succeeded by Carlos Minc
Party political offices
Preceded by Alfredo Sirkis	Green Party nominee for President of Brazil; 2010	Succeeded by Eduardo Jorge
Preceded by Anthony Garotinho	Brazilian Socialist Party nominee for President of Brazil; 2014	Most recent
New political party	Sustainability Network nominee for President of Brazil; 2018	Most recent
New political party	Spokesperson of the Sustainability Network; 2015–2018; Served alongside: Zé Gustavo	Succeeded by Pedro Ivo Batista; Laís Garcia
