= José Luiz Penna =

Brazilian politician (born 1945)

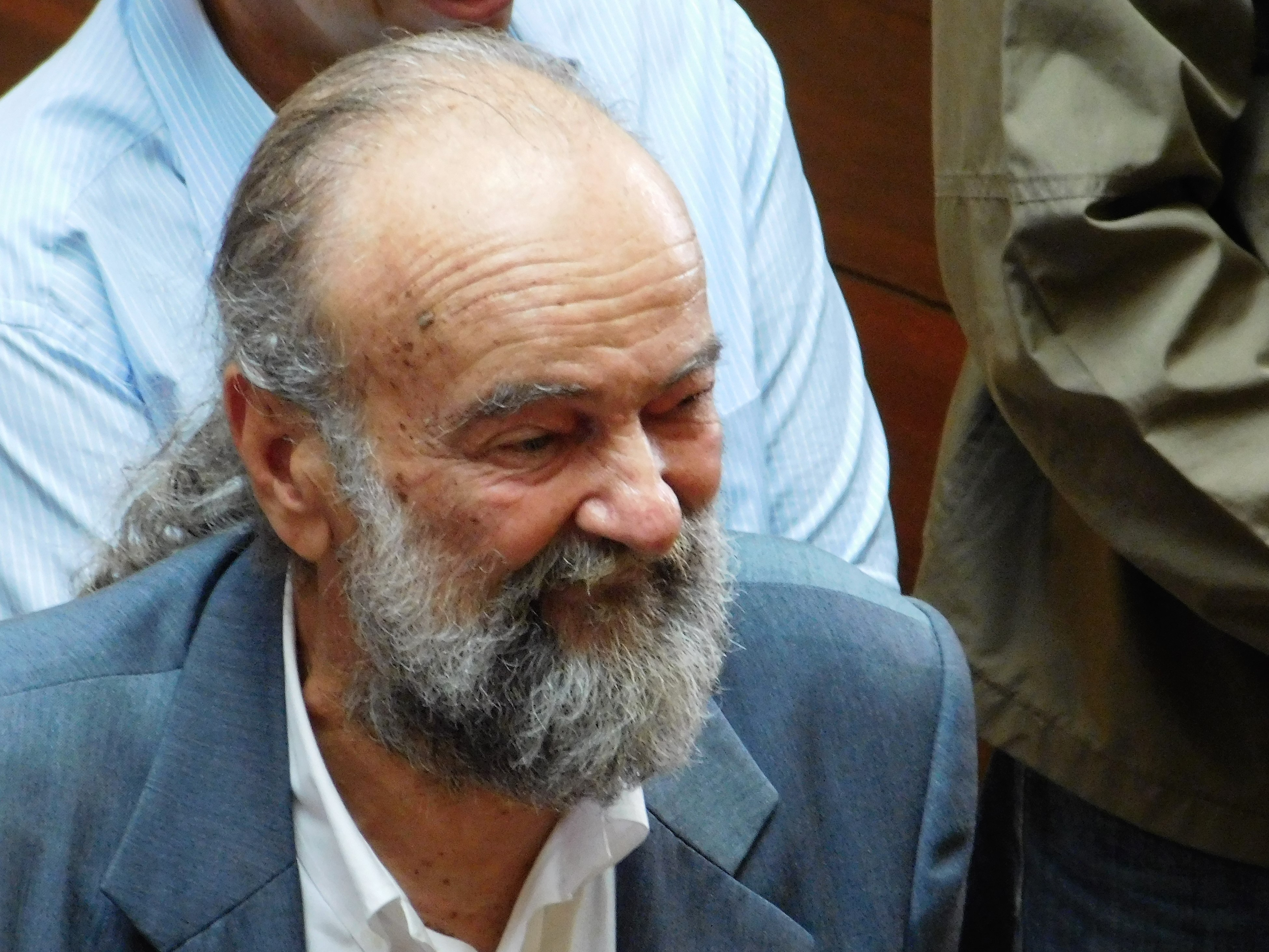

State Secretary of Culture of São Paulo
- In office 6 April 2017 – 6 April 2018
- Governor: Geraldo Alckmin
- Preceded by: José Roberto Sadek
- Succeeded by: Romildo Campello

Federal Deputy
- In office 1 February 2011 – 1 February 2015
- Constituency: São Paulo

Councillor of São Paulo
- In office 1 January 2009 – 1 February 2011
- Constituency: At-large

Personal details
- Born: José Luiz de França Penna; 27 December 1945 (age 80) Natal, Rio Grande do Norte, Brazil
- Party: PV (since 1986)
- Profession: Entrepreneur; musician; actor; filmmaker; politician

José Luiz de França Penna (born 27 December 1945) is a Brazilian businessman, musician and politician. He is a former member of the Chamber of Deputies and is the leader of the Green Party.

== Biography ==
José Luiz Penna was born in Natal, Brazil. He joined the Free Music Seminar at the Federal University of Bahia. He joined the Communist Party and, for a long time, made a living playing at night as a drummer in a rock band.
