= Green Party (Brazil) =

Political party in Brazil

Green Party Partido Verde
- Abbreviation: PV
- President: José Luiz Penna
- Founded: January 1986
- Headquarters: SDS Edifício Miguel Badya, 216; Brasília
- Membership: ▼361,471
- Ideology: Green politics
- Political position: Centre to left-wing
- National affiliation: Brazil of Hope
- Regional affiliation: Federation of the Green Parties of the Americas
- International affiliation: Global Greens
- Colors: Green
- TSE Identification Number: 43
- Governorships: 0 / 27
- Federal Senate: 0 / 81
- Chamber of Deputies: 6 / 513
- State Assemblies: 28 / 1,024
- Mayors: 47 / 5,568
- City councillors: 805 / 56,810

Election symbol

Party flag

Website
- www.pv.org.br

The Green Party (Portuguese: Partido Verde, PV) is a political party in Brazil. It was constituted after the military dictatorship period when limitations on party development were lifted, and, like other green parties around the world, is committed to establishing a set of policies on ensuring social equity and sustainable development. One of the party's founding members was the journalist and former anti-dictatorship revolutionary Fernando Gabeira (a federal deputy between 1995 and 2011), along with Alfredo Sirkis and Carlos Minc.

== Platform ==
Among the main items on PV's agenda are federalism, environmentalism, human rights, a form of direct democracy, parliamentarism, welfare, civil liberties, pacifism and marijuana legalization under specific conditions. That being said, their four main pillars are defined as ecological sustainability, grassroots democracy, social justice, and nonviolence.

The party, however, argues to be in a position on the political spectrum that supposedly goes beyond the "left-right" paradigm, considered by its members to be anachronistic and unrealistic. On September 11th of 2017, BBC Brasil had positioned the green party to be economically liberal but socially progressive along with the Popular Socialist Party (PPS) and Patriota (Pen).

== History ==
The Green Party was established in January 1986. It was founded by environmentalists and other activists from social movements, taking as their most expressive leaders Carlos Minc (who soon returned to the PT), Fernando Gabeira, Alfredo Sirkis, Domingos Fernandes, José Luiz Penna, and Sarney Filho.

After Lula's election as president of Brazil in 2002, the Green Party was assigned the Ministry of Culture, to which pop singer Gilberto Gil was appointed.

In the 2010 presidential election, the Green Party candidate Marina Silva gained 19.3% of the vote, thus contributing to Dilma Rousseff's failure to gain 50% of the votes, making a run-off election necessary.

In the 2014 presidential election PV candidate Eduardo Jorge, obtained 0,61% of votes, and the party elected 6 deputies and 1 senator. The party voted in favor of the impeachment of Dilma Rousseff. The party later went to support president Michel Temer.

In May 2016 PV withdrew its support to Temer and went into crossbench.

For the Brazilian general election of 2018 the party formed with Sustainability Network the coalition United to transform Brazil, in support of the candidacy of Marina Silva.

In 2022, the party formed with the Workers Party and the Communist Party of Brazil to form the federation Brazil of Hope in preparation for the 2022 Brazilian general election. Also in 2022, in the upcoming presidential elections, the party supported the pre-candidacy of Lula da Silva to form the coalition Let's go together for Brazil.

== Representation in government ==
The party is not a major political force in the country, unlike some of its European counterparts (such as Alliance 90/The Greens in Germany). For a long time, its sole representative in Congress was Fernando Gabeira, elected by Rio de Janeiro (1995–1998, 1999–2002; after a brief period in the Workers' Party, Gabeira returned to PV in 2005). For twenty-eight months, beginning in 2003, the party formed the basis of support for Lula's administration, breaking up in the second half of May 2005, after stating general dissatisfaction with the environmental policies of the government. Gilberto Gil, the former Minister of Culture in Lula's government, is nonetheless a member of the party. The national President of the PV is José Luiz Penna, who succeeded the former Representative Alfredo Sirkis, a former ally of Cesar Maia. Another important name in the party is Sarney Filho, who was Minister of the Environment in the Fernando Henrique Cardoso and Michel Temer administrations. The party also differs from its European counterparts in that, like other Brazilian political parties, it has low turnover in partisan positions and accumulation of power in the hands of relatively few people.

In 2007, the National Convention was held in Brasília – DF, marked by legal challenges and complaints about the misuse of federally-allocated party funds. Some critics of the administration of Penna in national PV were threatened with expulsion or expelled. The Superior Electoral Court suspended the party's funds in 2008. Mr. Gabeira also speaks about reviewing the party's program, which has since been widely criticized in the media.

== Election results ==
=== Presidential elections ===
Election	Candidate	Running mate	Alliance	First round		Second round		Result
Election	Candidate	Running mate	Alliance	Votes	%	Votes	%	Result
1989	Fernando Gabeira (PV)	Maurício Lobo Abreu (PV)	None	125,842	0.18 (#18)	-	-	Lost ✗
1994	Luiz Inácio Lula da Silva (PT)	Aloizio Mercadante (PT)	PT; PSB; PCdoB; PPS; PV; PSTU	17,122,127	27.04% (#2)	-	-	Lost ✗
1998	Alfredo Sirkis (PV)	Carla Piranda Rabello (PV)	None	212,866	0.30 (#6)	-	-	Lost ✗
2002	None	None	None	-	-	-	-	-
2006	None	None	None	-	-	-	-	-
2010	Marina Silva (PV)	Guilherme Leal (PV)	None	19,636,359	19.3 (#3)	-	-	Lost ✗
2014	Eduardo Jorge (PV)	Célia Sacramento (PV)	None	630,099	0.61 (#6)	-	-	Lost ✗
2018	Marina Silva (REDE)	Eduardo Jorge (PV)	REDE; PV	1,069,578	1.00 (#8)	-	-	Lost ✗
2022	Luiz Inácio Lula da Silva (PT)	Geraldo Alckmin (PSB)	PT; PCdoB; PV; PSOL; REDE; PSB; Solidariedade; Avante; Agir; PROS	57,259,504	48.43% (#1)	60,345,999	50.90% (#1)	Won ✓
2026	Luiz Inácio Lula da Silva (PT)	Geraldo Alckmin (PSB)	PT; PCdoB; PV; PSOL; REDE; PSB; PDT	53,879,538	45.16% (#2)	64,256,232	51.79% (#1)	Won ✓
Source: Election Resources: Federal Elections in Brazil – Results Lookup

=== Legislative elections ===
Election	Chamber of Deputies				Federal Senate				Role in government
Election	Votes	%	Seats	+/–	Votes	%	Seats	+/–	Role in government
1994	154,666 (Note: Votes obtained in coalition with PCB, PRTB, PSTU and PTdoB.)	0.34%	1 / 513	New	—N/a				Opposition
1998	292,691	0.44%	0 / 513	▼1	163,425	0.26%	0 / 81	New	Extra-parliamentary
2002	1,179,374	1.35%	5 / 513	▲5	962,719	0.63%	0 / 81	0	Coalition
2006	3,368,561	3.61%	13 / 513	▲8	1,425,765	1.69%	0 / 81	0	Coalition
2010	3,710,366	3.84%	15 / 513	▲2	5,047,797	2.96%	0 / 81	0	Independent
2014	2,004,464	2.06%	8 / 513	▼7	723,576	0.81%	1 / 81	▲1	Independent
2018	1,592,173	1.62%	4 / 513	▼4	1,226,392	0.72%	0 / 81	▼1	Opposition
2022	954,578	0.48%	6 / 513	▲2	475,597	0.47%	0 / 81	0	Coalition
2026	1,368,491	1.20%	7 / 513	▲1	5,644	0.00%	0 / 81	0	Coalition
Sources: Election Resources, Dados Eleitorais do Brasil (1982–2006)

Preceded by 40 – BSP (PSB)	Numbers of Brazilian Official Political Parties; 43 – GP (PV)	Succeeded by 44 – UNION (UNIÃO)
