= Eduardo Jorge =

Brazilian politician

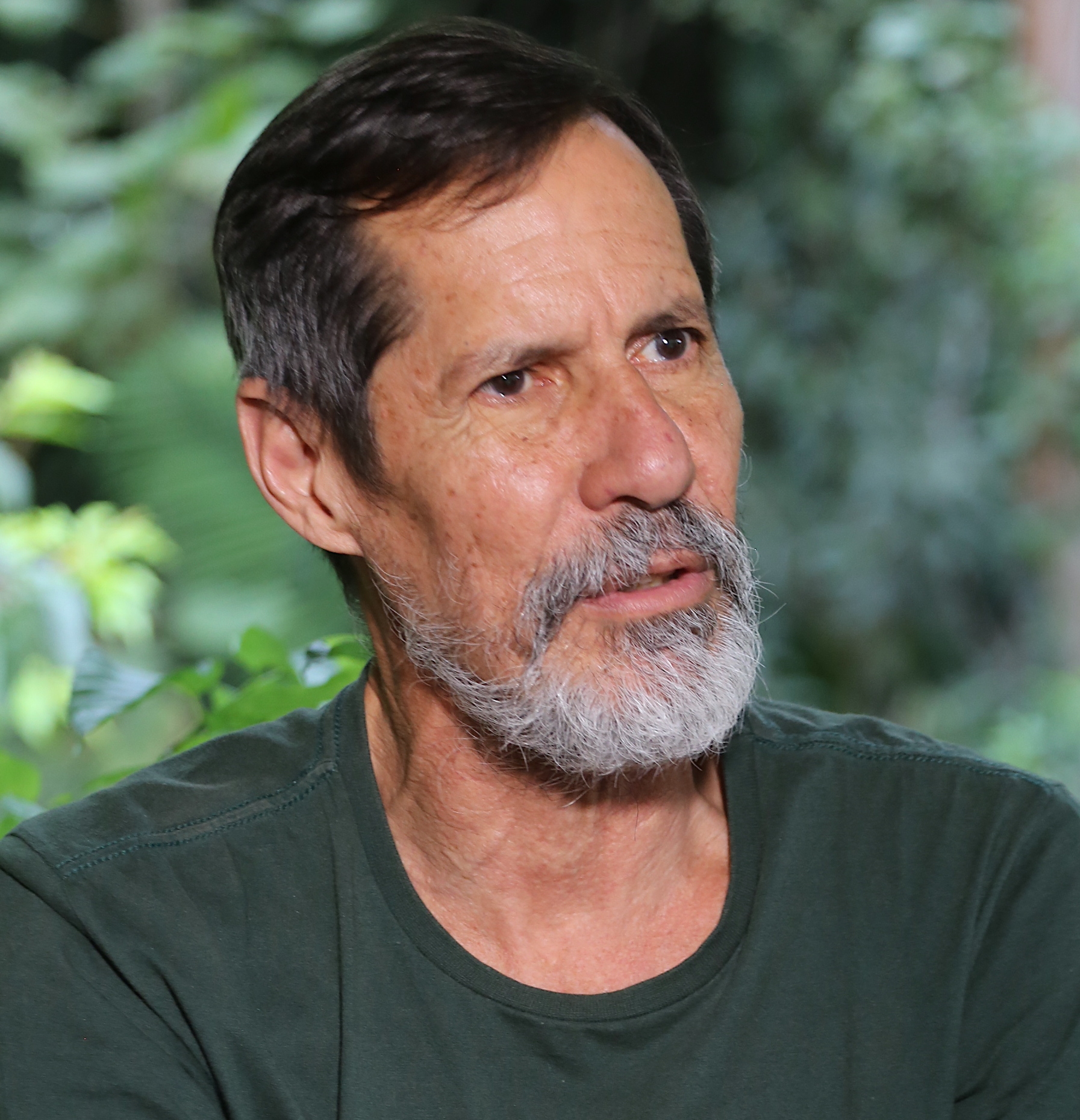
- Eduardo Jorge in 2018

Federal Deputy from São Paulo
- In office 1 February 1987 – 31 January 2003

State Deputy for São Paulo
- In office 1 February 1983 – 1 December 1986

Personal details
- Born: Eduardo Jorge Martins Alves Sobrinho; 26 October 1949 (age 76) Salvador, Brazil
- Party: PV (2003–present)
- Other political affiliations: PT (1980–2003)
- Education: Federal University of Paraíba
- Profession: Physician

Eduardo Jorge Martins Alves Sobrinho (born 26 October 1949) is a Brazilian public health physician and politician. He is best known for creating (or co-creating) federal laws on family planning, voluntary sterilization, the production of generic drugs, regulation of asbestos use, and linking budgetary resources for the Brazilian public health system.

== Biography ==
Born in Salvador, Bahia in Paraíba to Guilardo Martins Alves and Maria da Penha Gomes Martins, Jorge studied Medicine from 1967 to 1973, when he graduated from the Federal University of Paraíba. Following this, he obtained degrees in Preventive Medicine and Public Health from the University of São Paulo between 1974 and 1976. In addition, he engaged in politics as a militant activist for the Revolutionary Communist Party against the Brazilian military government. In 1976, he was hired to work as São Paulo's Department of Health as director of Itaquera's Health Center.

In 1980, he was one of the co-founders of the Brazilian Workers' Party, where he was a deputy for the state of São Paulo from 1983 to 1987. He was also Secretary of Health for the City of São Paulo in the governments of both Luiza Erundina (1989–1990) and Marta Suplicy's (2001–2002). Eduardo Jorge was a federal deputy from 1987 to 2003, when he left the Workers' Party and joined the Green Party. From 2005 to 2012, he was Secretary of the Environment for José Serra and Gilberto Kassab.

In 2014, Eduardo Jorge was announced as the Green Party's presidential candidate in the Brazilian general election of 2014. During his campaign, he advocated for the legalization of abortion as a public health issue, and for the legalization of drugs—which he had already defended as a Congressman in 1995—to end the war on drugs. In the end, he was the sixth most voted-for candidate, receiving 630,099 votes, corresponding to 0.61% of the total.

Party political offices
| Preceded by Marina Silva | PV nominee for President of Brazil; 2014 | Most recent |
| Preceded by Célia Sacramento | PV nominee for Vice President of Brazil; 2018 | Most recent |
