= Acir Gurgacz =

Brazilian politician and journalist

Acir Marcos Gurgacz
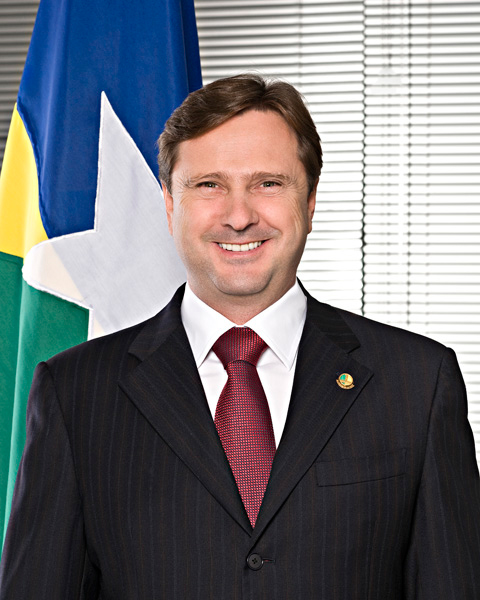

Senator for Rondônia
- In office November 5, 2009 – February 1, 2023

Personal details
- Born: February 5, 1962 (age 63); Cascavel, Paraná, Brazil
- Political party: PDT (1997–present)
- Spouse: Ana Maria Cardoso
- Profession: Businessman

Acir Marcos Gurgacz (born February 5, 1962) is a Brazilian politician and journalist. He has represented Rondônia in the Federal Senate since 2009. He is a member of the Democratic Labour Party.
