= 2014 Santos Cessna Citation crash =

Aircraft accident in Brazil

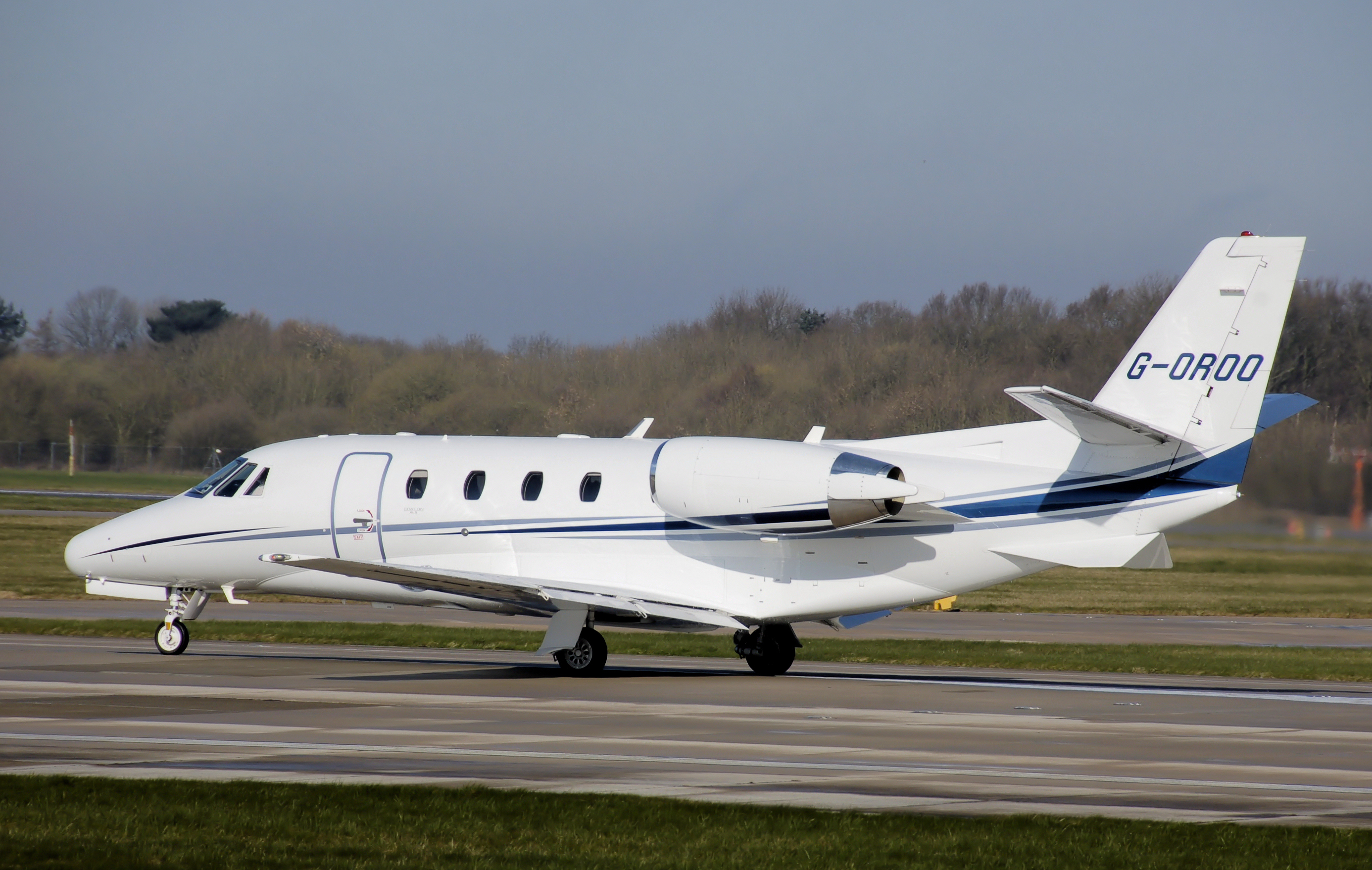
- A Cessna 560XL Citation XLS+ similar to the accident aircraft

Accident
- Date: 13 August 2014
- Summary: Loss of control following spatial disorientation on approach
- Site: Santos, São Paulo, Brazil; 23.9597°S 46.3269°W
- Total fatalities: 7
- Total injuries: 11

Aircraft
- Aircraft type: Cessna 560XL Citation XLS+
- Operator: Af Andrade Enterprises and Holdings Ltd
- Registration: PR-AFA
- Flight origin: Brasília International Airport, Brasília, Brazil
- Stopover: Santos Dumont Airport, Rio de Janeiro, Brazil
- Destination: Santos Air Force Base, Guarujá, Brazil
- Occupants: 7
- Passengers: 5
- Crew: 2
- Fatalities: 7
- Survivors: 0

Ground casualties
- Ground fatalities: 0
- Ground injuries: 11

On 13 August 2014, a Cessna Citation Excel business jet crashed while trying to land at Santos Air Force Base, near Santos, Brazil, killing all seven people on board. Among the victims was Brazilian Socialist Party presidential candidate Eduardo Campos. Eleven people on the ground were also injured. The accident investigation concluded that spatial disorientation in poor weather and pilot fatigue likely caused a low altitude loss of control of the aircraft, leading to the impact with the ground.

== Accident ==
Location of Santos within Brazil

The Cessna 560XL Citation XLS+ had taken off from Santos Dumont Airport, Rio de Janeiro, en route to Santos Air Force Base. Due to poor weather at the destination, the first landing attempt was abandoned, and contact was lost at 9:23 am local time. Around 10:00 am, the aircraft crashed into a densely populated area, about 4.3 km southwest of the Santos Air Force Base.

== Victims ==
Apart from Eduardo Campos, on board the aircraft were a pilot and a co-pilot, a camera operator, a photographer, one of Campos' campaign aides and one of his press aides. None of the passengers onboard including Campos survived the crash. Eleven people on the ground were injured.

== Investigation ==
Brazil's Aeronautical Accidents Investigation and Prevention Center performed the investigation into the accident. The report identified several factors that contributed to the accident.

Despite an annual maintenance inspection on 14 February 2014 which found that all maintenance was up-to-date, the aircraft's cockpit voice recorder had been inoperable since January 2013. By law, the aircraft could only fly without a functioning CVR if maintenance on it was scheduled within 15 days, or 30 in exceptional circumstances. The final report on the accident noted that the pilots' schedule complied with legal duty time and rest requirements, but that "expert examination of voice, speech and language parameters on the day of the accident...indicated...fatigue and somnolence on the part of the copilot in his communications with the ATS units."

The conditions at Santos Dumont Airport had deteriorated since the last meteorological report the pilots had received. The ceiling was 300 feet (91 m) below the safe ceiling for a circle-to-land approach, but allowed an approach using the ECHO 1 route. Despite informing air traffic control that they would use the ECHO 1 approach to Runway 35, the aircraft was far to the right of the ECHO 1 approach. After reviewing other approaches the captain had made using the flight management system on visual approaches, the investigators hypothesized that the captain was using a visual approach, aided by the FMS, with the intention of joining the ECHO 1 trajectory on final approach. The report notes that the captain used a similar approach in previous landings and that "it is possible that the captain’s experience of landing in runways of other countries with precarious infrastructure conditions, in addition to his mistaken assumption of the real meteorological conditions in the aerodrome, may have contributed to his feeling safe upon adopting such procedure." However, such an approach, which saved five minutes, was not permissible in the meteorological conditions at the time of the crash, when aircraft could only use instrument only (IFR) approaches.

The reason for abandoning the approach is unknown. Since the meteorological conditions were close to the minimum permitted for an IFR approach, the aircraft would need to approach close to the ECHO 1 approach trajectory. On the aircraft's improper approach, the investigation noted that there was a low probability that the aircraft could have stabilized its approach in order to land safely. With a wet runway and if the aircraft crossed the threshold at the reference speed, the aircraft would have a 385-metre (1,263 ft) safety margin to land on the wet runway. There was a 2 kn (3.7 km/h) tailwind at the time of the attempted landing. Additionally, a non-directional radio beacon (NDB) just before the runway (RR NDB) was non-functional on the day of the accident. Because the aircraft did not follow the ECHO 1 approach, it did not pass the only NDB available for determining the missed approach point, which was SAT NDB. The report concluded that "the fact that the crew did not follow the profile of the ECHO 1 [approach], along with their difficulty stabilizing the aircraft on a final approach, and the tail wind component condition may have contributed to their decision to discontinue the approach."

The proper missed approach procedure was to make a left turn at the missed approach point—the RR NDB, which was inoperable, or one minute and fifteen seconds past SAT NDB, which the aircraft didn't cross—and climb to 4,000 feet (1,200 m). However, the pilots made a low pass over the runway and began a gentle left turn at the end of the runway. Witnesses state that the aircraft made a low pass over the port before disappearing into the clouds. On this trajectory, the aircraft made a "tight" turn, with a bank angle up to 60° and g-force up to 2.0 G. The investigation hypothesized that the pilots were flying manually, therefore leading to a large workload for the pilot-in-command. The missed approach procedure required a significant amount of work that had to be performed in a short time. Investigators noted that "[t]he captain’s personal characteristics, indicating a person with a more impositive and confident posture, in opposition to the more passive posture of the copilot, in addition to the more limited knowledge of the equipment on the part of the latter and the possibility that he (the copilot) was fatigued, may also have hindered the dynamics of the crew in the management of the flight." Investigators believe the combination of the meteorological conditions, the effect of the high g-forces on the pilots' sense of spatial perception, and that the pilot-in-command would have been rapidly switching his focus between the instrument panel and exterior caused "incapacitating" spatial disorientation, which led to an "abnormal attitude."

The aircraft did not respond to multiple calls from air traffic control after initiating the missed approach, suggesting the pilots were under a heavy workload managing the aircraft. Two images of the aircraft from different cameras moments before the crash show the aircraft at 35° (± 5°) and 22.4° dive angles. The report notes that "the aircraft could only have reached such speed and fly that trajectory[] if it had climbed considerably" after entering the clouds and that, in normal conditions, the pilots would not have deliberately placed the aircraft in such a steep dive.

Of fracture surfaces examined, none showed signs of fatigue but were caused by stress overload at the moment of impact. There was no abnormality with engine function in the moments before the crash and no evidence of failure of any aircraft system.

It also emerged that the on-board cockpit voice recorder did not record any of the conversations during the flight before it crashed. Unlike bigger airplanes, the Citation Excel was not required by regulations to have a flight data recorder.

== See also ==
- List of fatalities from aviation accidents
