= List of ministers of natural environment of Brazil =

This is a list of the ministers of the natural environment and their preceding offices.

== Secretary of Natural Environment (Ministry of the Interior) ==
- Paulo Nogueira Neto (1973–1985)
- Roberto Messias Franco (1985–1985)

== Ministry of Urban Development and Natural Environment ==
- Flávio Rios Peixoto da Silveira (1985–1986)
- Deni Lineu Schwartz (1986–1987)
- Prisco Viana (1987–1988)

== Secretary of Natural Environment for the President ==
- Ben-hur Luttembarck Batalha (1988–1989)
- José Lutzenberger (1990–1992)
- José Goldemberg (1992–1992)
- Flávio Miragaia Perri (1992–1992)

== Minister of Natural Environment ==
- Fernando Coutinho Jorge (1992–1993)

== Minister of Natural Environment and the Legal Amazon ==
- Rubens Ricupero (1993–1994)
- Henrique Brandão Cavalcanti (1994–1994)

== Minister of Natural Environment, Water Resources and the Legal Amazon ==
- Gustavo Krause (1995–1998)

== Minister of Natural Environment ==
No.	Image	Name	Term of office		Political Party	President	Ref.
1		Sarney Filho	1999	2002	Liberal Front Party	Fernando Henrique Cardoso	
2		José Carlos Carvalho	2002	2002		Fernando Henrique Cardoso	
3		Marina Silva	2003	2008	Green Party	Luiz Inácio Lula da Silva	
4		Carlos Minc	2008	2010	Green Party	Luiz Inácio Lula da Silva	
5		Izabella Teixeira	2010	2016		Dilma Rousseff	
6		Sarney Filho	2016	2018	Green Party	Michel Temer	
7		Edson Duarte	2018	2019		Michel Temer	
8		Ricardo Salles	2019	2021		Jair Bolsonaro	
9		Joaquim Alvaro Pereira Leite	2021	2022		Jair Bolsonaro	
10		Marina Silva	2023	present	Sustainability Network	Luiz Inácio Lula da Silva	
