= Post-2015 Development Agenda =

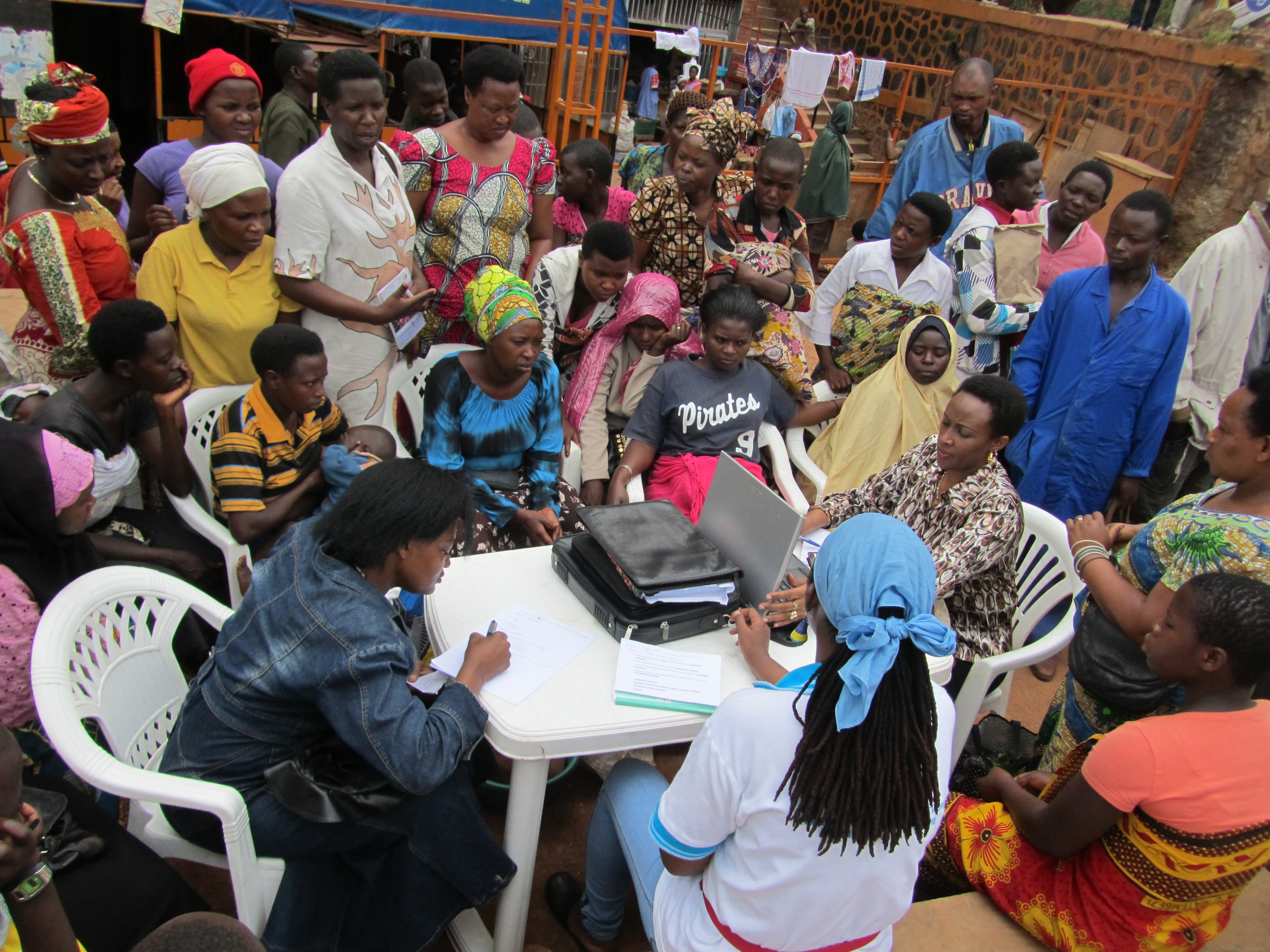
Global conversation on the Post-2015 sustainable development agenda.

In the United Nations, the Post-2015 Development Agenda was a set of talks and discussions that led to the creation of the 2030 Agenda for Sustainable Development, encompassing the 17 Sustainable Development Goals. This replaced the Millennium Development Goals which ended in 2015.

In January 2013, the 30-member UN General Assembly Open Working Group on Sustainable Development Goals was established to identify specific goals for the SDGs. The Open Working Group (OWG) was tasked with preparing a proposal on the SDGs for consideration during the 68th session of the General Assembly, September 2013 – September 2014. On 19 July 2014, the OWG forwarded a proposal for the SDGs to the Assembly. After 13 sessions, the OWG submitted their proposal of 8 SDGs and 169 targets to the 68th session of the General Assembly in September 2014. On 5 December 2014, the UN General Assembly accepted the secretary general's Synthesis Report, which stated that the agenda for the post-2015 SDG process would be based on the OWG proposals.

== Background ==
In 1972, governments met in Stockholm, Sweden, for the United Nations Conference on the Human Environment to consider the rights of the family to a healthy and productive environment.

The current UN development agenda is centred on the Millennium Development Goals (MDGs) that were officially established following the Millennium Summit of the UN in 2000. The MDGs encapsulate eight globally agreed goals in the areas of poverty alleviation, education, gender equality and empowerment of women, child and maternal health, environmental sustainability, reducing HIV/AIDS and communicable diseases, and building a global partnership for development. The MDG's overall target date is 2015.

At the 2010 High-Level Plenary Meeting of the UN General Assembly to review progress towards the MDGs, governments called for accelerating progress and for thinking on ways to advance the development agenda beyond 2015. After the 2010 High-Level Plenary Meeting, the UN secretary-general Ban Ki-moon has taken several initiatives. He has established a UN System Task Team, launched a High-Level Panel of Eminent Persons and appointed Amina J. Mohammed as his own Special Advisor on Post-2015 Development Planning. These processes are complemented by a set of eleven global thematic consultations and national consultations in 88 countries] facilitated by the United Nations Development Group (UNDG).

The Rio+20 outcome document mentioned that "at the outset, the OWG [Open Working Group] will decide on its methods of work, including developing modalities to ensure the full involvement of relevant stakeholders and expertise from civil society, Indigenous Peoples, the scientific community and the United Nations system in its work, in order to provide a diversity of perspectives and experience".

The gaps and shortcomings of MDG Goal 8 (To develop a global partnership for development) led to identifying a problematic "donor-recipient" relationship. Instead, the new SDGs favor collective action by all countries.

Negotiations on the Post-2015 Development Agenda began in January 2015 and ended in August 2015. The negotiations ran in parallel to United Nations negotiations on financing for development, which determined the financial means of implementing the Post-2015 Development Agenda; those negotiations resulted in the adoption of the Addis Ababa Action Agenda in July 2015.

== The United Nations Task Team ==
The UN System Task Team was established by the Secretary-General Ban Ki-moon to support UN system-wide preparations for the Post-2015 UN Development Agenda. It comprises 60 UN agencies, as well as the World Bank and the International Monetary Fund. In June 2012, it published the report "Realizing the Future We Want for All" which serves as an input to the work of the High-Level Panel.

== High-level panel of eminent persons ==
On 31 July 2012, Secretary-General Ban Ki-moon appointed 27 civil society, private sector, and government leaders from all regions of the world to a High-Level Panel (HLP) to advise him on the Post-2015 Development Agenda. Members of the panel include:

- Susilo Bambang Yudhoyono (co-chair), President of Indonesia
- Ellen Johnson Sirleaf (co-chair), President of Liberia
- David Cameron (co-chair), Prime Minister of United Kingdom
- Fulbert Gero Amoussouga, economic advisor of the president of Benin
- Izabella Teixeira, Minister for the Environment of Brazil
- Yingfan Wang, Member of the Secretary-General's MDG Advocacy Group, China
- María Ángela Holguín, Foreign Minister of Colombia
- Gisela Alonso, president of the Agency of Environment of Cuba
- Jean-Michel Severino, former director general of the French Development Agency
- Horst Köhler, Former IMF managing director and former president of Germany
- Naoto Kan, Former prime minister of Japan
- Queen Rania Al Abdullah, Queen of Jordan
- Betty Maina, chief executive of the Association of Manufacturers of Kenya
- Abhijit Banerjee, Ford Foundation International Professor of Economics, from India
- Andris Piebalgs, European Commissioner for Development from Latvia
- Patricia Espinosa, Foreign Minister of Mexico
- Paul Polman, CEO of Unilever, from the Netherlands
- Ngozi Okonjo-Iweala, Finance Minister of Nigeria
- Elvira Nabiullina, economic advisor to the Russian president
- Graça Machel, Member of The Elders, South Africa
- Sung Hwan Kim, Minister of Foreign Affairs and Trade, Republic of Korea
- Gunilla Carlsson, Minister for International Development Cooperation, Sweden
- Emília Pires, Minister of Finance of Timor-Leste
- Kadir Topbas, Mayor of Istanbul, Turkey
- John Podesta, chair of the Center for American Progress, United States of America
- Tawakkol Karman, journalist, Nobel Peace Prize laureate, Yemen
- Amina J. Mohammed, Nigeria (ex officio, special adviser of Ban Ki-moon)

The HLP's work is guided by 24 framing questions. It held its first meeting on 25 September 2012 on the margins of the annual high level debate of the UN General Assembly and it submitted its recommendations on how to arrive at an agreement on the post-2015 agenda to the Secretary-General in May 2013. The terms of reference of the HLP include the consideration of the findings of the national and thematic consultations at regional and national levels.

== High-level panel's report ==
On 30 May 2013, the High-Level Panel on the Post-2015 Development Agenda released "A New Global Partnership: Eradicate Poverty and Transform Economies through Sustainable Development," a report which sets out a universal agenda to eradicate extreme poverty from the face of the earth by 2030, and deliver on the promise of sustainable development. The report calls upon the world to rally around a new Global Partnership that offers hope and a role to every person in the world.

In the report, the Panel calls for the new post-2015 goals to drive five big transformation shifts:

1. Leave No One Behind. After 2015 we should move from reducing to ending extreme poverty, in all its forms. We should ensure that no person – regardless of ethnicity, gender, geography, disability, race or other status – is denied basic economic opportunities and human rights.
2. Put Sustainable Development at the Core. We have to integrate the social, economic and environmental dimensions of sustainability. We must act now to slow the alarming pace of climate change and environmental degradation, which pose unprecedented threats to humanity.
3. Transform Economies for Jobs and inclusive growth. A profound economic transformation can end extreme poverty and improve livelihoods, by harnessing innovation, technology, and the potential of business. More diversified economies, with equal opportunities for all, can drive social inclusion, especially for young people, and foster sustainable consumption and production patterns.
4. Build Peace and Effective, Open and Accountable Institutions for All. Freedom from conflict and violence is the most fundamental human entitlement, and the essential foundation for building peaceful and prosperous societies. At the same time, people the world over expect their governments to be honest, accountable, and responsive to their needs. We are calling for a fundamental shift – to recognize peace and good governance as a core element of well-being, not an optional extra.
5. Forge a New Global Partnership. A new spirit of solidarity, cooperation, and mutual accountability must underpin the post-2015 agenda. This new partnership should be based on a common understanding of our shared humanity, based on mutual respect and mutual benefit. It should be centered on people, including those affected by poverty and exclusion, women, youth, the aged, disabled persons, and indigenous peoples. It should include civil society organizations, multilateral institutions, local and national governments, the scientific and academic community, businesses, and private philanthropy.

== Regional consultations ==
Regional organizations are conducting consultations to formulate regional positions on the Post-2015 Development Agenda. Notably, the African Union has mandated the African Union Commission, the United Nations Economic Commission for Africa, the African Development Bank and UNDP Regional Bureau for Africa, to come up with an African Common Position on the Post 2015 Development Agenda. This Common Position will be a result of multiple sub-regional and regional consultations with African policy makers (national and regional), civil society organizations, academia, the private sector and other relevant stakeholders.

In May 2014 the Planet Earth Institute hosted an event at the United Nations in New York where the panel (including Alvaro Sobrinho, Paul Boateng & Christopher Edwards) spoke on Delivering the Post 2015 applied science and skills agenda for Africa: the role of business.

== National consultations ==
National consultations on the Post-2015 Development Agenda are designed to open to crowd-sourcing the usually closed multilateral negotiation process. The consultations generate inputs into global policy making from individuals and groups in 88 countries through meetings and conferences, online discussions, and larger public debates. The consultations are organized by UN teams in the participating 88 countries and will conclude by the end of March 2013. They form an integral part in the elaboration of the Post-2015 Development Agenda. National consultations follow several objectives:

- They help countries build a national position, which can later on facilitate the negotiation for the future framework.
- They increase countries' empowerment of the future framework. It took several years before the current MDGs, which were not designed in an inclusive way, were recognized by advanced and developing countries.
- They help build national and international consensus on a range of issues.
- They will bring to the UN General Assembly an overall perspective of national and regional priorities on the post-2015 framework, thus facilitating the negotiation between the member states.

The consultations include different stakeholders including civil society organizations, disadvantaged and minority groups, the private sector, academia, women organizations and youth, and other constituencies according to particular national contexts. The countries selected to participate are a representative sample across several dimensions: regional, country typology, and different types of development challenges. Countries are determining how they want to take the consultations forward, but UNDG provided guidelines in support.

== Global thematic consultations ==
Starting in May 2012, the objective of the global thematic consultations is to organize formal and informal meetings with different stakeholders around current and emerging challenges. The consultations focus on eleven themes identified by UNDG: inequalities, health, education, growth and employment, environmental sustainability, governance, conflict and fragility, population dynamics, hunger, food and nutrition security, energy, and water.

Several thematic meetings have already taken place. The first thematic meeting on growth, structural change and employment was held in Tokyo, Japan, on 15–16 May 2012.

== Post-2015 dialogue ==
Researchers have discussed that the post-2015 dialogue is an opportunity to develop a practical agenda to ensure the principle of 'leaving no one behind' translates into real changes to deliver essential services to those in poverty. They called for a potential agenda which must recognise that both institutional capacity and politics matter for the more equitable delivery of these services. They found no blueprint for this, but evidence from the Overseas Development Institute and others points to the need to adopt frameworks which are more flexible, grounded, and innovative in service delivery, which also requires changes to donors' models.

== "A Million Voices: The World We Want" report from the global consultations ==
This report by the United Nations Development Group (UNDG) collects the perspectives on the 'world we want' from over 1 million people around the globe. For almost one year, people engaged in 88 national consultations, 11 thematic dialogues, and through the MY World global survey. As member states consult on the shape and content of a successor framework to the Millennium Development Goals (MDGs) beyond 2015, it is hoped that the opportunity to listen to these voices will contribute to reaching consensus on what is needed to move towards a common sustainable future.

The report was launched at a press conference by the Secretary-General Ban Ki-moon and Helen Clark, UNDP Administrator and chair of UNDG on 10 September 2013 in New York.

Paragraph 246 of the "Future We Want" outcome document forms the link between the Rio+20 agreement and the Millennium Development Goals: "We recognize that the development of goals could also be useful for pursuing focused and coherent action on sustainable development. The goals should address and incorporate in a balanced way all three dimensions of sustainable development (environment, economics, and society) and their interlinkages. The development of these goals should not divert focus or effort from the achievement of the Millennium Development Goals". Paragraph 249 states that "the process needs to be coordinated and coherent with the processes to consider the post-2015 development agenda".

Taken together, paragraph 246 and 249 paved the way for the Millennium Development Goals (MDGs). The MDGs were officially established following the Millennium Summit of the United Nations in 2000 and the agreement in the Future We Want outcome document. The Rio+20 summit also agreed that the process of designing sustainable development goals, should be "action-oriented, concise and easy to communicate, limited in number, aspirational, global in nature and universally applicable to all countries while taking into account different national realities, capacities and levels of development and respecting national policies and priorities".

Because the MDGs were to be achieved by 2015, a further process was needed. Discussion of the post-2015 framework for international development began well in advance, with the United Nations System Task Team on Post 2015 Development Agenda releasing the first report known as Realizing The Future We Want. The Report was the first attempt to achieve the requirements under paragraph 246 and 249 of the Future We Want document. It identified four dimensions as part of a global vision for sustainable development: Inclusive Social Development, Environmental Sustainability, Inclusive Economic Development, and Peace and Security. Other processes included the UN Secretary General's High Level Panel on the Post 2015 Development Agenda, whose report was submitted to the Secretary General in 2013.

== "Delivering the Post-2015 Development Agenda" report from the dialogues on implementation ==
This United Nations Development Group (UNDG) report picks up from where the "A Million Voices" report left off by looking more in depth at factors within a specific country that will either support or impede implementation. The findings of this report derive from six Dialogues revealing several main principles in order to support the successful implementation of the new development agenda: participation, inclusion, and the need for strengthened capacities and partnerships.

=== Dialogues on Localizing the post-2015 development agenda ===
Lessons learned from the MDGs show the key role of local government in defining and delivering the MDGs, and in communicating them to citizens. Evidence for this includes the multiplication of decentralized development cooperation initiatives and the use of city-to-city cooperation as a cost-effective mechanism for implementation.

In February 2014, UNDP and the United Nations Human Settlements Programme (UN-Habitat), on behalf of UNDG, together with the Global Taskforce of Local and Regional Governments for the Post- 2015 Development were appointed to lead the dialogue on the means of implementation of the Post-2015 agenda at the local level. The process was implemented jointly with national governments, local government and their associations, citizens and communities. The results included valuable contributions from the local level, voicing local issues at national and international levels.

The dialogue's main objective has been to identify and propose ways of implementing the new development agenda successfully. The results of the national and local dialogues have also informed regional and international events and policy discussions, and have been presented to key decision-makers of the Post-2015 framework.

At the end of the UNDG mandated Dialogue on Localizing the Post-2015 Development Agenda, several of the institutions that led the process expressed an interest in continuing to advocate for the full involvement of LRGs and local stakeholders in the coming weeks and months.

- PRELIMINARY KEY MESSAGES FROM THE DIALOGUE ON LOCALIZING THE POST-2015 DEVELOPMENT AGENDA:
  1. Local and Regional Governments (LRGs) are essential for promoting inclusive sustainable development within their territories and, therefore, are necessary partners in the implementation of the Post-2015 agenda.
  2. Effective local governance can ensure the inclusion of a diversity of local stakeholders, thereby creating broad-based ownership, commitment and accountability.
  3. An integrated multi-level and multi-stakeholder approach is needed to promote transformative agendas at the local level.
  4. Strong national commitment to provide adequate legal frameworks and institutional and financial capacity to local and regional governments is required.
  5. Call upon national governments and the UN to strongly advocate for the localization of the agenda at the intergovernmental negotiations and to support the involvement of local and regional governments and local stakeholders in the intergovernmental negotiation through their representative networks, including in the Third International Conference on Financing for Development;
  6. Encourage the Post-2015 agenda to stress the importance of establishing environments that unlock the development potential of local and regional governments and local stakeholders by creating an enabling institutional framework at all levels and by localizing resources and ensuring territorial approach for sustainable development.
  7. Further call for the redoubling of efforts to include reliable targets and indicators for the SDGs that respond to local contexts, needs and concerns, in order to foster transparency and accountability.

=== Capacities and institutions ===
To achieve a transformation agenda, we need transformed institutions that highlight the importance of national-level actors. This new agenda takes into account a diversity of stakeholders with policies and actions derived from a specific national context. When strengthening capacities we should concentrate on existing institutions and national development plans.

=== Participatory monitoring and accountability ===
We need to actively engage with individuals by embedding participation as a principle for the realization of a new post-2015 development agenda. This new development agenda will be aligned with a human rights approach that will improve the quality of and refine policies over time.

=== Culture ===
Utilizing cultural values and culturally sensitive approaches can mediate and improve development outcomes by providing a space where opportunities for education, gender equality and women's and girls' empowerment, environmental sustainability, and durable urbanization can be realized.

=== Private Sector ===
Partnerships with the private sector will prove to be useful due to its ability to create an environment favourable to social and environmental impacts. By reinforcing the nature of ethical business practices, businesses can move beyond financial contributions and move towards poverty eradication and sustainability.

=== Civil Society ===
The diversity of civil society can create an enabling environment that will strengthen the impact and trust of multiple stakeholders. By partnering with civil society, a space will be created that is more inclusive and responsive towards the local and global voices of stakeholders. Civil society will also create strong accountability mechanisms that can be used to measure implementation.

The report was launched at a General Assemybly side event with the Secretary-General Ban Ki-moon and Helen Clark, UNDP Administrator and chair of UNDG on 25 September 2014 in New York.

== Governance ==
Fragile and conflict affected states have been left behind and unchanged in the rapid decline in global poverty since 2000 says a February 2013 paper from the Overseas Development Institute. The researchers report that the outcome statement of the recent Monrovia meeting of the high level panel said - 'Economic growth alone is not sufficient to ensure social justice, equity and sustained prosperity for all people...The protection and empowerment of people is crucial.'

They write that the 'global MyWorld citizen survey also show the extent that people see 'an honest and responsive government' as a top priority. This emerged as the second highest of a range of sixteen factors' ... 'second only to 'a good education' globally (and within the top five priorities for Low-Human Development Index countries).'

Researchers found that areas gaining traction in the post 2015 conversation include -

- Building accountability for goals into the heart of a new framework
- Ensuring there is transparency for how resources are used
- Commitments on civil and political freedoms
- Supporting effective institutions of the state

They warn against the polarisation of the debate around the strength of the post-2015 goals.

They found that 'some political, governance and accountability features do seem to shape whether and how MDG commitments have been achieved (alongside important issues of resourcing, technical capacities and others)' and identified key factors:

- Credible political commitments between politicians and citizens are essential.
- More inclusive institutions matter, as well as the ability to work together
- States effectiveness is a determinant of development progress, so state capacities and functions do need more attention.

Their findings focus on national level governance 'because of the growing body of evidence relevant to development progress available at this level.'

Global governance is also important to the authors of the report. They recognise a strong interest in bringing on-board multilateral institutions, the private sector and non-governmental organisations in a future framework, based on the 'recognition that they can help or hinder future development outcomes.'

They called for further work on global governance, including the identification of viable options for improving its effectiveness. They also highlighted the need for ambitious goals in the global consultation on governance and post-2015 goals, as well as open discussion and debate involving new actors.

== Global web platforms ==
Launched in September 2012, the web platform, is a repository for both the thematic and the national consultations. It allows people from all over the world to participate in the global conversation on the issue they want to highlight in the post-2015 development debate. Moreover, the website hosts a complementary global survey, which asks people to submit their six priorities for a better world.

In February 2014, the UN Special Envoy for Youth and the president of the General Assembly launched the Global Partnership for Youth in the Post-2015 Development Agenda, with a Crowdsourcing platform to consolidate concrete language for youth priorities in the post-2015 goals.

== Open working group proposal ==
At the UN Conference on Sustainable Development (Rio+20), held in Rio de Janeiro in June 2012, 192 UN member states agreed to establish an intergovernmental working group to design Sustainable Development Goals (SDGs) as a successor of the MDGs. The HLP's work will be closely coordinated with this working group in order to bring together the processes around the Post-2015 Development Agenda and the SDGs. The working group has presented an 'Outcome Document' of 19. July 2014, comprising 17 goals and 169 targets. Activities of the Open Working Group, leading to the Outcome Document, are rendered at its website, the new goals for Sustainable development were announced on Seventieth anniversary of the United Nations, as marked by the Secretary-General Ban Ki-moon with a name "UN70".
