= Sopho Kiladze =

Georgian lawyer and politician

Prof. Dr. Sophie (Sopio) Kiladze
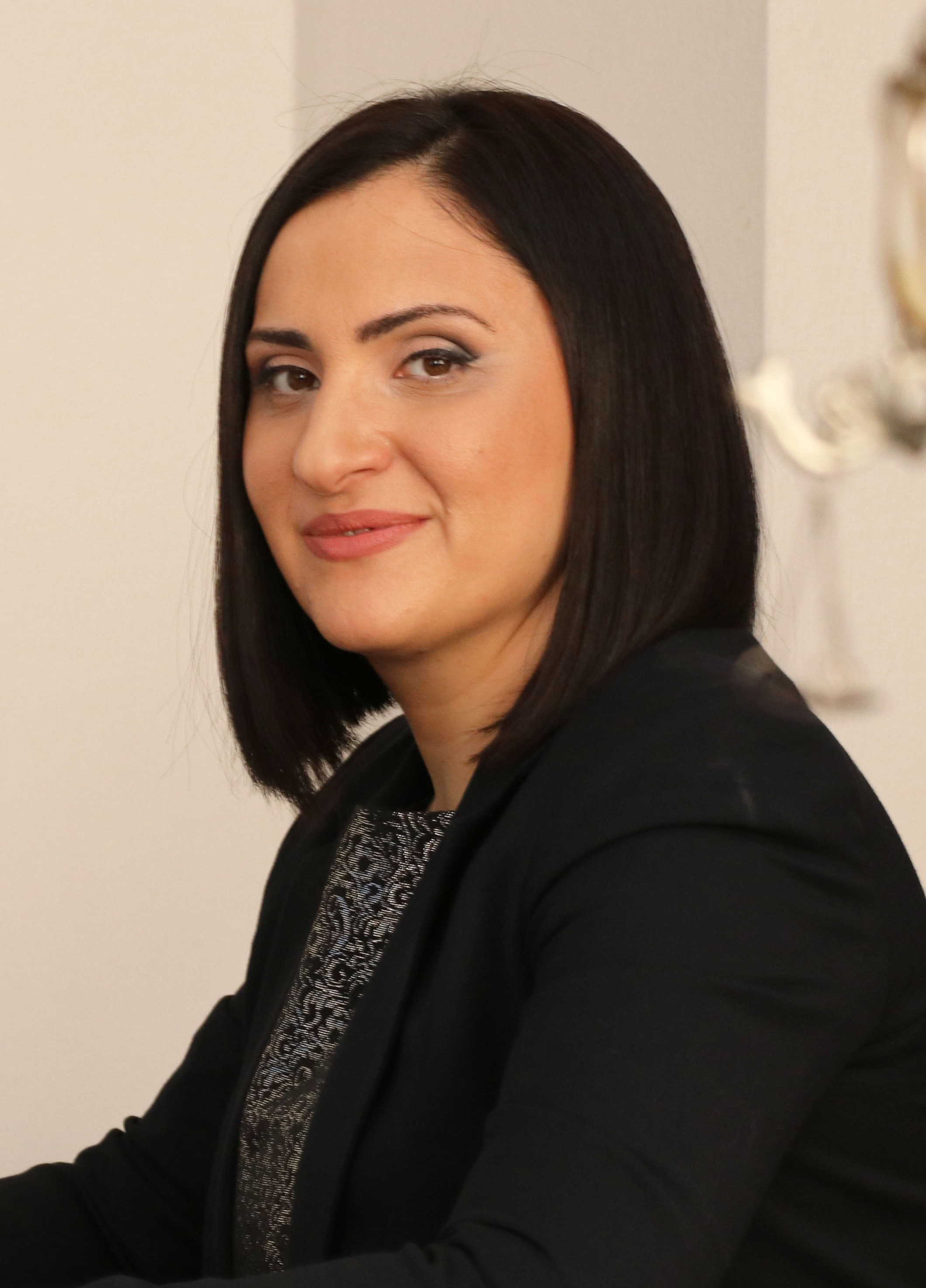

Chair of the UN Committee on the Rights of the Child; former Member of the Parliament of Georgia (2016-2020)
- In office 2025–2027

Personal details
- Born: January 16, 1984 (age 42) Kutaisi, Georgian Soviet Socialist Republic, Soviet Union
- Party: Georgian Dream
- Education: Heidelberg University
- Occupation: Lawyer, politician
- Awards: Presidential Medal of Honor (Georgia)

Sophie (Sopio) Kiladze (Georgian: სოფიო (სოფო) კილაძე: ; born 16 January 1984) is a Georgian lawyer and politician.

== Biography ==
She was born in the city of Kutaisi. She graduated from the Joseb Otskheli Gymnasium in Kutaisi.

From 2003 to 2011, she lived in Germany, where she studied law at the Ruprecht Karl University of Heidelberg. She did an internship in 2008 at SAP in Walldorf, Germany at Global Legal. From 2008 to 2011, she worked on the Max Planck Institute for Comparative Public Law and International Law’s Encyclopedia of Public International Law project. During this period, she also worked for one year at the law firm Bau, Becky & Collegen in Heidelberg. In 2011, she returned to Georgia and began teaching. From 2011 to 2013, she lectured in the LL.M. program at the University of Cologne (LLM zu Köln). Since 2012, she has lectured at Grigol Robakidze University. She holds Dr.iuris academic degree since 2024.

From 2012 to 2014, she headed the Department of International Cooperation at the Ministry of Internal Affairs of Georgia. Between 2014 and 2016, she served as Vice-Rector of the Ministry's Academy. She was leading the drafting group of the Law of Georgia on Police. In this period she has elaborated several legislative amendments to combat drug crime and a new Law of Georgia on New Psychoactive Substances which resulted in decrease of the use of so-called "crocodile" "vint" and "Jeff" by 99% as well as new psychoactive substances by around 90%.

Since 2015, she has been a member and analyst at "Society 2030." That same year, she was awarded the Presidential Medal of Honor by the President of Georgia.

From 2016 to 2020, Kiladze was a member of the 9th convocation of the Parliament of Georgia as a majoritarian representative, elected through the electoral bloc "Georgian Dream – Democratic Georgia."She is the author and initiator of several legislative initiatives. Among them—in cooperation with UNICEF Georgia, the Parliament of Georgia adopted the Code on the Rights of the Child—a unified state policy document containing mechanisms to ensure child welfare. She also authored the Law on Social Work, adopted by the Parliament of Georgia in cooperation with the Friedrich Ebert Foundation South Caucasus.

For the 2023–2028 term, she was elected a member of the European Commission against Racism and Intolerance (ECRI) under the Council of Europe.

In 2021, she was elected as a member of the United Nations Committee on the Rights of the Child for the term 2021–2025, and serves as the official liaison of the Committee with the Inter-Parliamentary Union (IPU). In 2023, she was elected Vice-Chair of the same committee.

2023-2025 she served as a Vice-Chair of the same Committee.

She was elected as a Chair of the UN Committee on the Rights of the Child for the term 2025-2027.

At the UN Committee on the Rights of the Child Kiladze initiated enhancement of the role of Parliament in child rights protection and is the Focal Point for Inter-Parliamentary Union of the Committee on the Rights of the Child. In this capacity Kiladze has elaborated the CRC-IPU Joint Statement in a close collaboration with the Secretary General of Inter-Parliamentary Union Martin Chungong.

In 2024 she has initiated the topic on Artificial Intelligence and Child Rights. For focused work on AI she established partnership with the UNICRI Center for AI and Robotics as well as the International Telecommunications Union. The process led to the enhanced work of the Committee on AI, creating a dedicated Working Group and addressing various AI-related topics in the Concluding Observations.

She initiated the Joint Statement on AI and the Rights of the Child, the first international document of international organizations focused specifically on child rights in the context of Artificial Intelligence. High-Level signing ceremony took place in Geneva, on the 19th of January 2026. It is intended to support and guide States, international organizations and all other relevant stakeholders how to use opportunities of the AI for children to realize their rights, but also how to prevent and mitigate risks from AI.

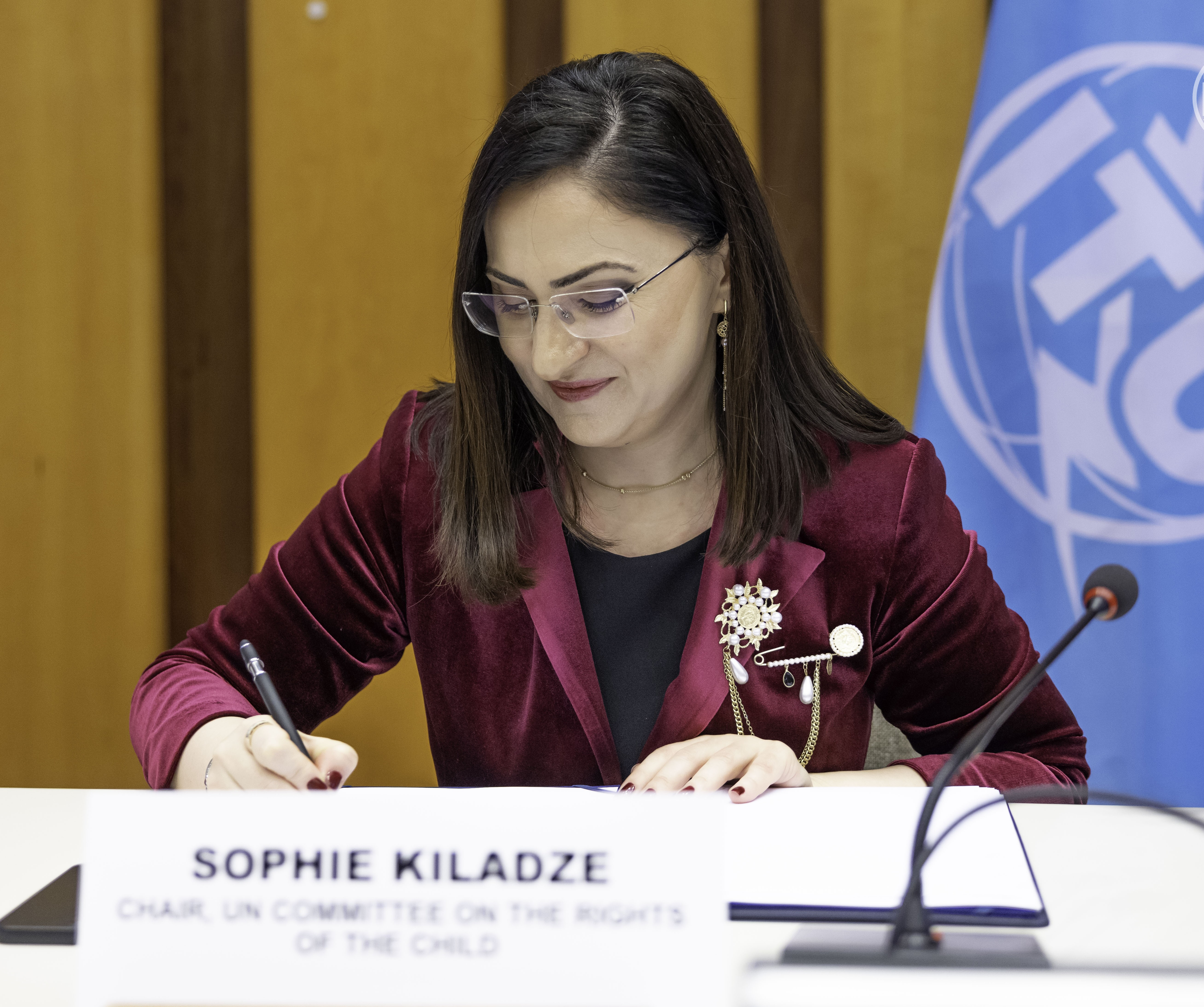

The process is coordinated by International Telecommunication Union (ITU), and following international organizations were involved in the elaboration process: CRC, UNICRI Centre for AI and Robotics, Inter-Parliamentary Union(IPU), UNESCO, United Nations Office on Drugs and Crime, Council of Europe, SRSG Violence against Children, SRSG Children in Armed Conflict, SRSG against sexual exploitation and abuse of children, ILO, United Nations Office for Disarmament Affairs and different CSOs and academia representatives.

== Honors and membership ==
In 2015 she became a holder of Medaille of Honour of the President of Georgia. She was the member of 2017 State Constitutional Commission of Georgia working on the revision of the Constitution of Georgia. She became holder of scholarship of 2013-2014 Carl Friedrich von Goerderler-Kolleg for Good Governance, together with Robert Bosch Stiftung (Berlin, Germany) as well as of the Open World Fellowship in 2017 (Washington, the United States of America) and of 2022 German Academic Exchange Service (DAAD) Scholarship, Academy of Human Rights, University of Cologne.

== Academic work ==
2008-2011 Kiladze worked at Max-Planck Institute for Comparative Public Law and International Law, on the Max Planck Encyclopedia of Public International Law.

2011-2013 she gave lectures at the Master Program LLM zu Köln in Constitutional Law of Germany.

Since 2012 she gives lectures and since 2025 is a full professor in public law at Grigol Robakidze University

Author and co-author of various books, articles and publications. Participated in various international Conferences.

She organized the hybrid Conference on AI and Child Rights dedicated to the 35th Anniversary of the Convention on the Rights of the Child at the Grigol Robakidze University. The Conference brought together over 1200 children and adults from around 60 countries, various international organization, leading Universities, business representatives, CSOs and experts to discuss unprecedented opportunities for realization of child rights, at the same time imposing enormous threats on children.

The Conference facilitated the discussion on the draft Joint Statement on AI and Child Rights. There was a closed session for the discussion and exchange of views dedicated to the draft Joint Statement together with all relevant stakeholders, sharing comments and views, bringing inputs and different perspectives. The Conference has ensured participation of children from all 5 regions of the United Nations both in person and online. Three different units were dedicated to children. Children from different parts of the world opened the conference bringing their messages to the audience. On the Panel dedicated to AI for Good: Children’s Inputs, children could bring their creative projects to share with others, how AI can be used for positive outcomes serving to good purposes. The third panel for children ensured meaningful child participation in the Joint Statement on AI and Child Rights. Children answered three questions bringing to decision-makers what points they would like to see in the Joint Statement and how they see shaping of its content.

== Publications ==
S Kiladze Best Interests of the Child (Universal 2025 Tbilisi)

S. Kiladze ‘Effectivity of Public International Law: A Need for Paradigm Change’1 Torun International Studies 15 2022, pp. 5–23.

S Kiladze and P. Turava Guiding Commentaries of the Code on the Rights of the Child (Iuristebis Samkaro 2021 Tbilisi).

S Kiladze ‘Realization of Child Rights in Municipalities: according to the Code on the Rights of the Child’ Academic Digest 2021. pp. 60–80.

S. Kiladze and A. Pirtskhalashvili Manual on Social Work Law (Friedrich-EbertStiftung 2018 Tbilisi).

I. Beraia, Q. Giorgishvili, L. Izoria, S. Kiladze, D. Muzashvili, P. Turava Police Law (Police Academy 2015 Tbilisi)

S. Kiladze Fallloesung im Jurastudium, Internationale Tagung Fachsprache 2012 (2014) pp. 44–50
