= Izabella Teixeira =

Environment Minister of Brazil

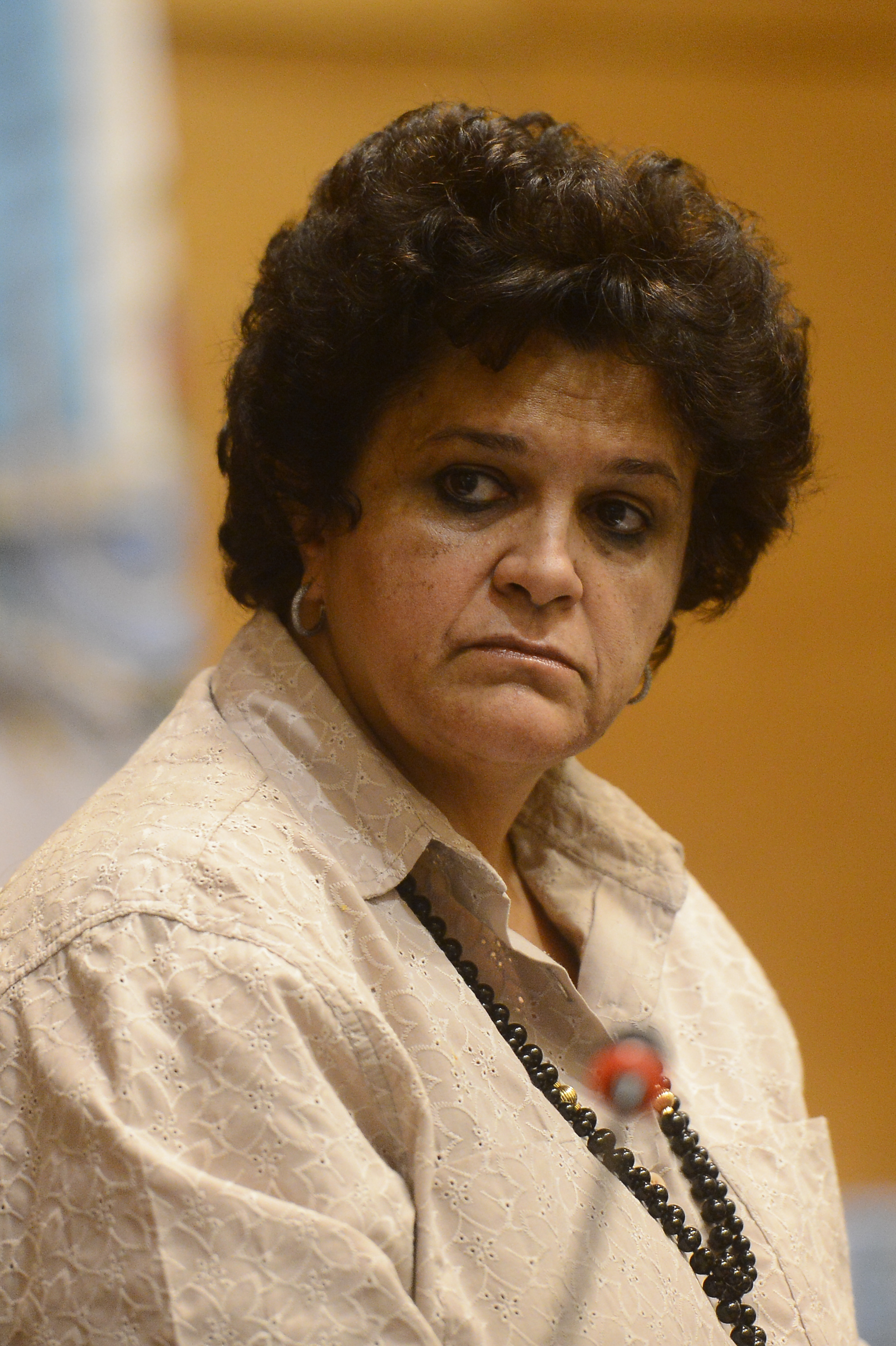

Minister of Environment
- In office 30 March 2010 – 12 May 2016
- President: Luiz Inácio Lula da Silva; Dilma Rousseff
- Preceded by: Carlos Minc
- Succeeded by: Sarney Filho

Personal details
- Born: Izabella Mônica Vieira Teixeira; 9 October 1961 (age 64) Brasília, Federal District, Brazil
- Education: University of Brasília (BS)
- Profession: Biologist, public servant

Izabella Mônica Vieira Teixeira (born 9 October 1961) was the Brazilian Minister of the Environment. She is the recipient of the Lifetime Achievement Award (Champions of the Earth) in 2013.

== Education ==
She was born in Brasília, and has a master's degree in energy planning and a Ph.D. in environmental planning from COPPE/UFRJ (Federal University of Rio de Janeiro).

== Early career ==
In May 2010 she was appointed Minister of the Environment, and, in January 2011 she was reappointed to the position by Dilma Rousseff, Brazil's new President.

== Minister of the Environment ==
In October 2010 Teixeira made a statement on behalf of Brazil at the 10th conference on the Convention on Biological Diversity in Nagoya, Japan, in which she outlined Brazil's view that the time for talking had stopped and that compromise may be required among the various nations in order to achieve actions. She also spoke at the 2010 United Nations Climate Change Conference in Cancún, Mexico.

At home in Brazil, she successfully hosted the Rio+20 (UN Conference on Sustainable Development) and the 2012 World Environment Day.

On 24 September 2012, Teixeira was appointed by UN Secretary-General Ban Ki-moon to serve on the High-Level Panel of Eminent Persons on the Post-2015 Development Agenda.

== Issues ==
=== Deforestation ===
Teixeira is devoted to reversing the deforestation of the Amazon Rainforest, and achieved an 84% reduction in deforestation from 2004 to 2012, a "remarkable feat that is a tribute to her courage to push against the tide of destruction and is a significant initiative from Brazil on climate change mitigation". Her land-use planning policies saved 250,000 km^{2} of conservation areas—the equivalent of 75 percent of protected forests in the world.

From August 2012 to July 2013, the rate of deforestation increased by 29% in the Amazônia Legal (Legal Amazon), and from 2013 to 2014, it rose by 358%. With Teixeira as Environment Minister, Brazil has also refused to sign the anti-deforestation pledge that aims to reduce deforestation by 2030, dealing a blow to the Climate Change summit that took place in New York in October 2014. “Unfortunately, we were not consulted,” Brazil’s Environment Minister Izabella Teixeira told the Associated Press.

=== 2014 FIFA World Cup ===
On 24 May 2014, Teixeira announced a pollution-reducing initiative aimed at making the 2014 FIFA World Cup the most environmentally friendly ever by allowing companies to buy carbon credits in exchange for the right to advertise themselves as official “green seal” World Cup sponsors. In addition, along with the United Nations Environment Program, Teixeira launched a project called “green passport” that promoted sustainable tourism.

Political offices
Preceded by Carlos Minc	Minister of Environment; 2010–2016	Succeeded by Sarney Filho
