= Priscila Krause =

Brazilian journalist and politician

Priscila Krause Branco
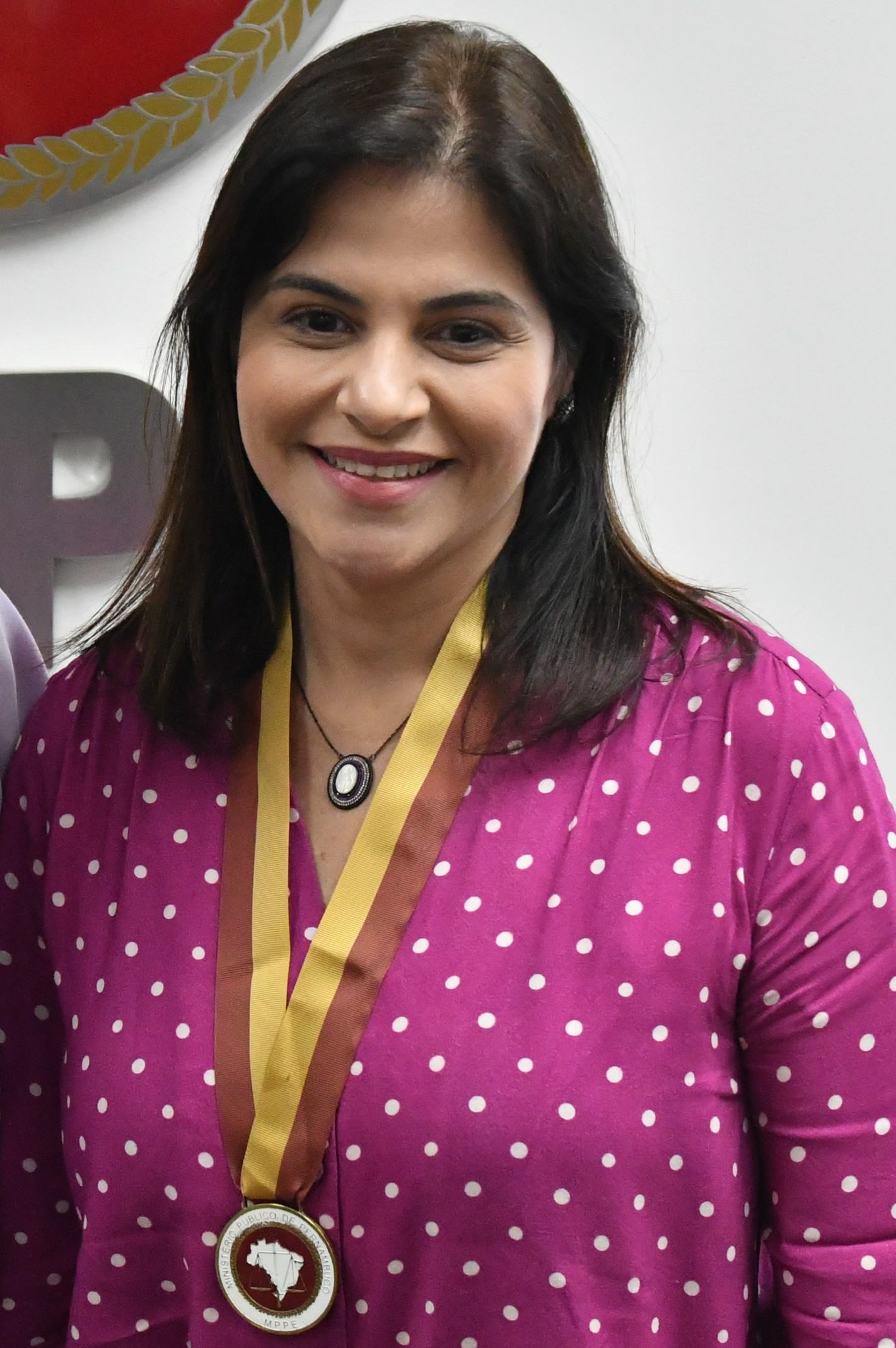
- Priscila in 2022.

16th Vice-Governor of Pernambuco
- Incumbent
- Assumed office January 1, 2023
- Governor: Raquel Lyra
- Preceded by: Luciana Santos

State Deputy of Pernambuco
- In office February 1, 2015 – January 1, 2023

Councillor of Recife
- In office January 1, 2005 – February 1, 2015

Personal details
- Born: April 15, 1978 (age 48) Recife
- Citizenship: Brazil
- Party: Cidadania (2022–present)
- Other political affiliations: PFL (1994–2007); EM (2007–2021)
- Education: Catholic University of Pernambuco
- Profession: Journalist
- Website: www.blogdepriscila.com.br

Priscila Krause Branco (Recife, April 15, 1978) is a Brazilian journalist and politician affiliated with Cidadania. She is the current vice-governor of Pernambuco, having previously been a state deputy and city councilor of Recife. She is the daughter of Gustavo Krause, also a politician, former governor of Pernambuco and former mayor of Recife.

== Personal life ==
Daughter of Gustavo Krause and Clea Borges, Priscila has four siblings – Daniela, Manoela, Arthur, and Lara – and is the only one of her generation to have followed a political career, like her father, who was governor of Pernambuco, mayor of Recife, Minister of Finance, Minister of Environment, Water Resources, and the Legal Amazon, federal deputy, and city councillor of Recife. She was elected councillor in 2004 while attending the second year of Journalism at the Catholic University of Pernambuco, graduating in 2008.

== Career ==
She has been a Democrats (DEM) member since she was 16 years old, when the party was still called the PFL. Priscila Krause was elected councillor of Recife in 2004 with 8,376 votes, for the PFL party. Her first term of office was focused on human rights policies, winning the presidency of the Human Rights Commission in the City Council.

In 2007, she became president of the municipal directory of the DEM in Recife. In 2008, she was re-elected councilwoman for the party with 10,270 votes, being the 7th most voted candidate. She was leader of the opposition to the government of Mayor João da Costa (PT) in 2010 and 2011, and was active in demanding more transparency in the municipal government.

In 2012, she was again elected councilwoman, being the 3rd most voted candidate with 13,386 votes and the only one from the coalition Por um Recife Melhor (For a Better Recife) (DEM/PMN) to be elected.

== See also ==
- Legislative Assembly of Pernambuco
