= Luciana Santos =

Luciana Santos may refer to:

- Luciana dos Santos, Brazilian long jumper, triple jumper and sprinter.
- Luciana Santos (politician), Brazilian engineer and politician
