= Ministry of Environment and Climate Change (Brazil) =

Federal ministry in Brazil

- Portuguese: Ministério do Meio Ambiente e Mudança do Clima
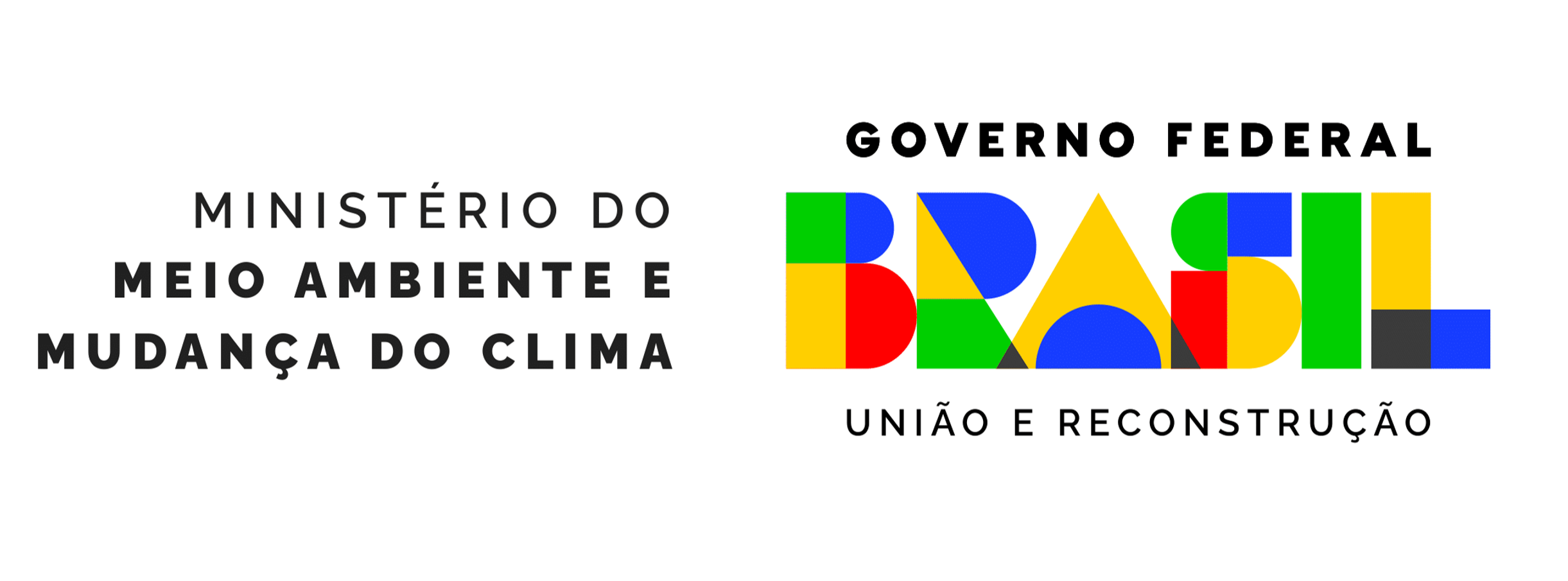

Agency overview
- Formed: 14 January 1974; 51 years ago
- Type: Ministry
- Jurisdiction: Federal government of Brazil
- Headquarters: Esplanada dos Ministérios, Bloco B Brasília, Federal District
- Annual budget: $3.63 b BRL (2023)
- Agency executives: Marina Silva, Minister; João Paulo Capobianco, Executive-Secretary; Rita Guimarães Mesquita, Secretary of Biodiversity, Forests and Animal Rights; Adalberto Maluf Filho, Secretary of Urban Environment and Environmental Quality; Ana Toni, Secretary of Climate Change; Carina Mendonça, Secretary of Bioeconomy; Edel Santiago, Secretary of Traditional People and Communities and Sustainable Rural Development
- Website: www.gov.br/mma/

The Ministry of Environment and Climate Change (Portuguese: Ministério do Meio Ambiente e Mudança do Clima, abbreviated MMA) is a cabinet-level federal ministry in Brazil. The ministry emerged from the Special Secretariat for the Environment within the now-extinct Ministry of the Interior from 1974 to 1985. It has gone through several name changes since its inception.

== Responsibilities ==
- National Environmental Policy
- Environmental policies and programs for the Amazon and other Brazilian biomes
- Water resources policy
- National water security policy
- Policies for the preservation, conservation and sustainable use of ecosystems, biodiversity and forests
- Policies for integrating environmental protection with economic production
- Regulatory and economic strategies, mechanisms and instruments for improving environmental quality and the sustainable use of natural resources
- National policy on climate change
- Ecological-economic zoning and other territorial planning instruments, including marine spatial planning, in articulation with other competent Ministries
- Management of public forests for sustainable production
- Management of the Rural Environmental Registry (CAR) at the federal level
- Policies for the integration between environmental policy and energy policy
- Policies for the protection and recovery of native vegetation
- Environmental quality of human settlements, in conjunction with the Ministry of Cities
- National environmental education policy, in conjunction with the Ministry of Education
- Shared management of fisheries resources, in conjunction with the Ministry of Fisheries and Aquaculture

== Structure ==
=== Councils ===
- National Council for the Environment (CONAMA);
- National Water Resources Council (CNRH);
- Genetic Heritage Management Council (CGen);
- National Council for the Legal Amazon (CONAMAZ);
- National Rubber Council (CNB);
- National Commission to Combat Desertification (CNCD);
- Steering Committee of the National Fund on Climate Change;
- Deliberative Council of the National Environment Fund
- National Council of Traditional Peoples and Communities (CNPCT)

=== Secretariats ===
- Executive Secretary
- National Secretariat for Biodiversity, Forests and Animal Rights
- National Secretariat for Urban Environment and Environmental Quality
- National Secretariat for Climate Change
- National Bioeconomy Secretariat
- National Secretariat of Traditional Peoples and Communities and Sustainable Rural Development
- Extraordinary Secretariat for Deforestation Control and Territorial Environmental Planning
- National Secretariat for Biodiversity, Forests and Animal Rights
- Brazilian Forest Service

=== Linked Entities ===
- Brazilian Institute of Environment and Renewable Natural Resources (IBAMA)
- Chico Mendes Institute for Biodiversity Conservation (ICMBio)
- Rio de Janeiro Botanical Garden
- National Water Agency

== List of Environmental Ministers ==
No.	Portrait	Minister	Took office	Left office	Time in office	Party	President
1	Paulo Nogueira Neto	Paulo Nogueira Neto (1922–2019)	14 January 1974	15 March 1985	11 years, 60 days	Independent	Emílio Garrastazu Médici (ARENA); Ernesto Geisel (ARENA); João Figueiredo (ARENA)
2	Flávio Rios Peixoto da Silveira	Flávio Rios Peixoto da Silveira (born 1945)	15 March 1985	14 February 1986	336 days	Independent	José Sarney (MDB)
–	Deni Liney Schwartz	Deni Liney Schwartz (born 1938); Acting	14 February 1986	23 October 1987	1 year, 251 days	Independent	José Sarney (MDB)
3	Prisco Viana	Prisco Viana (1932–2015)	23 October 1987	15 February 1989	1 year, 115 days	MDB	José Sarney (MDB)
4	Ben-hur Luttembarck Batalha	Ben-hur Luttembarck Batalha (1943–2000)	15 February 1989	15 March 1990	1 year, 28 days	Independent	José Sarney (MDB)
5	José Lutzenberger	José Lutzenberger (1926–2002)	15 March 1990	23 March 1992	2 years, 8 days	Independent	Fernando Collor (PRN)
–	José Goldemberg	José Goldemberg (born 1928); Acting	23 March 1992	14 July 1992	113 days	Independent	Fernando Collor (PRN)
6	Flávio Miragaia Perri	Flávio Miragaia Perri (born 1940)	14 July 1992	2 October 1992	80 days	Independent	Fernando Collor (PRN)
7	Fernando Coutinho Jorge	Fernando Coutinho Jorge (1939–2019)	19 October 1992	16 September 1993	332 days	PSDB	Itamar Franco (MDB)
8	Rubens Ricupero	Rubens Ricupero (born 1937)	14 September 1993	5 April 1994	203 days	Independent	Itamar Franco (MDB)
–	Henrique Brandão Cavalcanti	Henrique Brandão Cavalcanti (1929–2020); Acting	5 April 1994	1 January 1995	271 days	Independent	Itamar Franco (MDB)
9	Gustavo Krause	Gustavo Krause (born 1946)	1 January 1995	1 January 1999	4 years, 0 days	PFL	Fernando Henrique Cardoso (PSDB)
10	Sarney Filho	Sarney Filho (born 1957)	1 January 1999	5 March 2002	3 years, 63 days	PFL	Fernando Henrique Cardoso (PSDB)
11	José Carlos Carvalho	José Carlos Carvalho (born 1952)	5 March 2002	1 January 2003	302 days	Independent	Fernando Henrique Cardoso (PSDB)
12	Marina Silva	Marina Silva (born 1958)	1 January 2003	13 May 2008	5 years, 133 days	PT	Luiz Inácio Lula da Silva (PT)
13	Carlos Minc	Carlos Minc (born 1951)	13 May 2008	31 March 2010	1 year, 322 days	PT	Luiz Inácio Lula da Silva (PT)
14	Izabella Teixeira	Izabella Teixeira (born 1961)	31 March 2010	12 May 2016	6 years, 42 days	Independent	Luiz Inácio Lula da Silva (PT); Dilma Rousseff
15	Sarney Filho	Sarney Filho (born 1957)	12 May 2016	6 April 2018	1 year, 329 days	PV	Michel Temer (MDB)
16	Edson Duarte	Edson Duarte (born 1965)	6 April 2018	1 January 2019	270 days	PV	Michel Temer (MDB)
17	Ricardo Salles	Ricardo Salles (born 1975)	1 January 2019	23 June 2021	2 years, 173 days	NOVO; Independent	Jair Bolsonaro (PSL)
18	Joaquim Leite	Joaquim Leite (born 1967)	23 June 2021	1 January 2023	1 year, 192 days	Independent	Jair Bolsonaro (PL)
19	Marina Silva	Marina Silva (born 1958)	1 January 2023	Incumbent	2 years, 326 days	REDE	Luiz Inácio Lula da Silva (PT)

== See also ==
- Environment of Brazil
- Environmental governance in Brazil
- List of environmental ministries
