= Adriano Sarney =

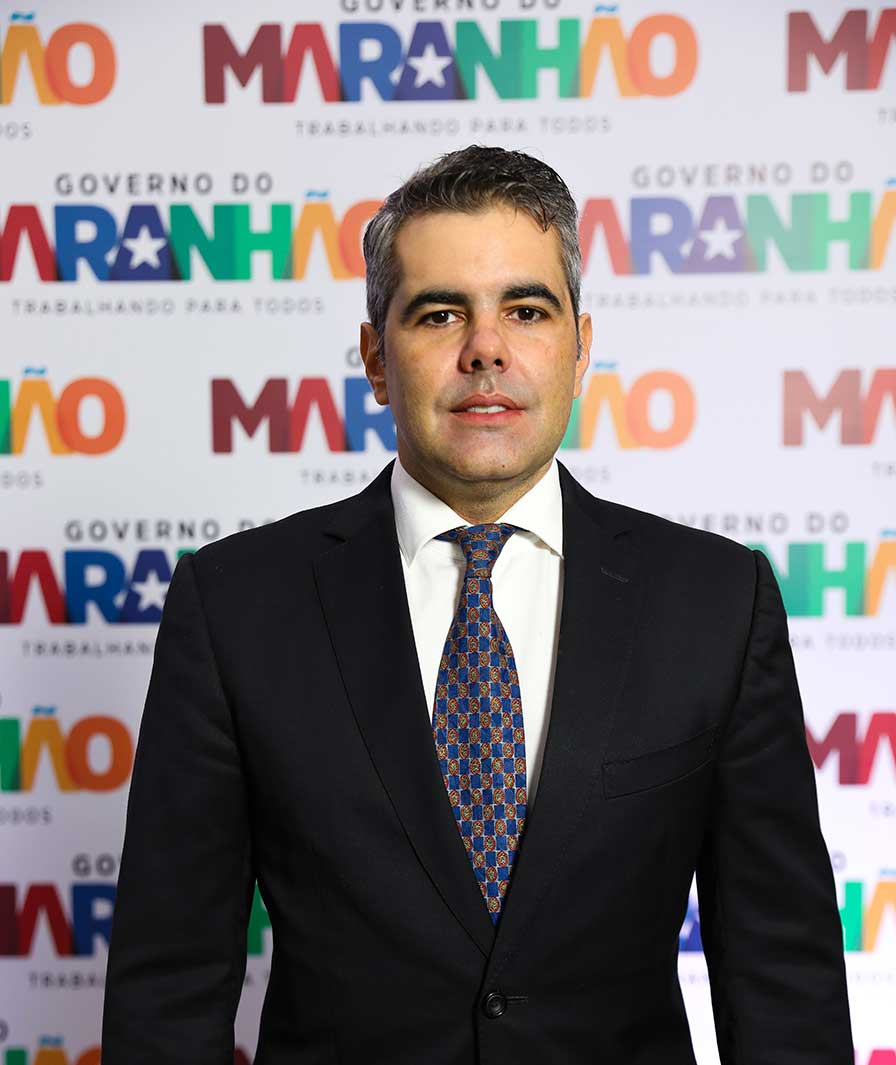

State Representative of Maranhão
- Incumbent
- Assumed office 1 February 2015

Personal details
- Born: June 20, 1980 (age 45) São Luís, Maranhão, Brazil
- Party: PV
- Spouse: Fernanda Sarney
- Parent(s): Sarney Filho; Lucialice Cordeiro
- Profession: Economist

José Adriano Cordeiro Sarney (born 20 June 1980), better known as Adriano Sarney, is an economist, administrator and Brazilian politician affiliated with the Green Party (PV). He is the grandson of the former President of the Republic, José Sarney, and son of the environment minister, Sarney Filho. José Adriano exercises his first term of state deputy.

== Biography ==
Sarney was born in São Luís. He holds a degree in economics from the Université Paris I Panthéon-Sorbonne, France, and a degree from Harvard University, Faculty of Arts and Sciences, Cambridge, USA. He is a columnist for the newspaper O Estado do Maranhão.

In 2014, he was elected state deputy. In 2016 he was leader of the Green Party bench in the Legislative Assembly. He chaired the Committee on Economic Affairs in 2015 and the Committee on Municipal Affairs and Regional Development in 2016. He was elected to the Presiding Board for the period 2017-2018. He is president of the Parliamentary Front of the Micro and Small Business.

He is one of the deputies of opposition to the government of Flávio Dino.
