= Paulo Câmara =

Brazilian politician

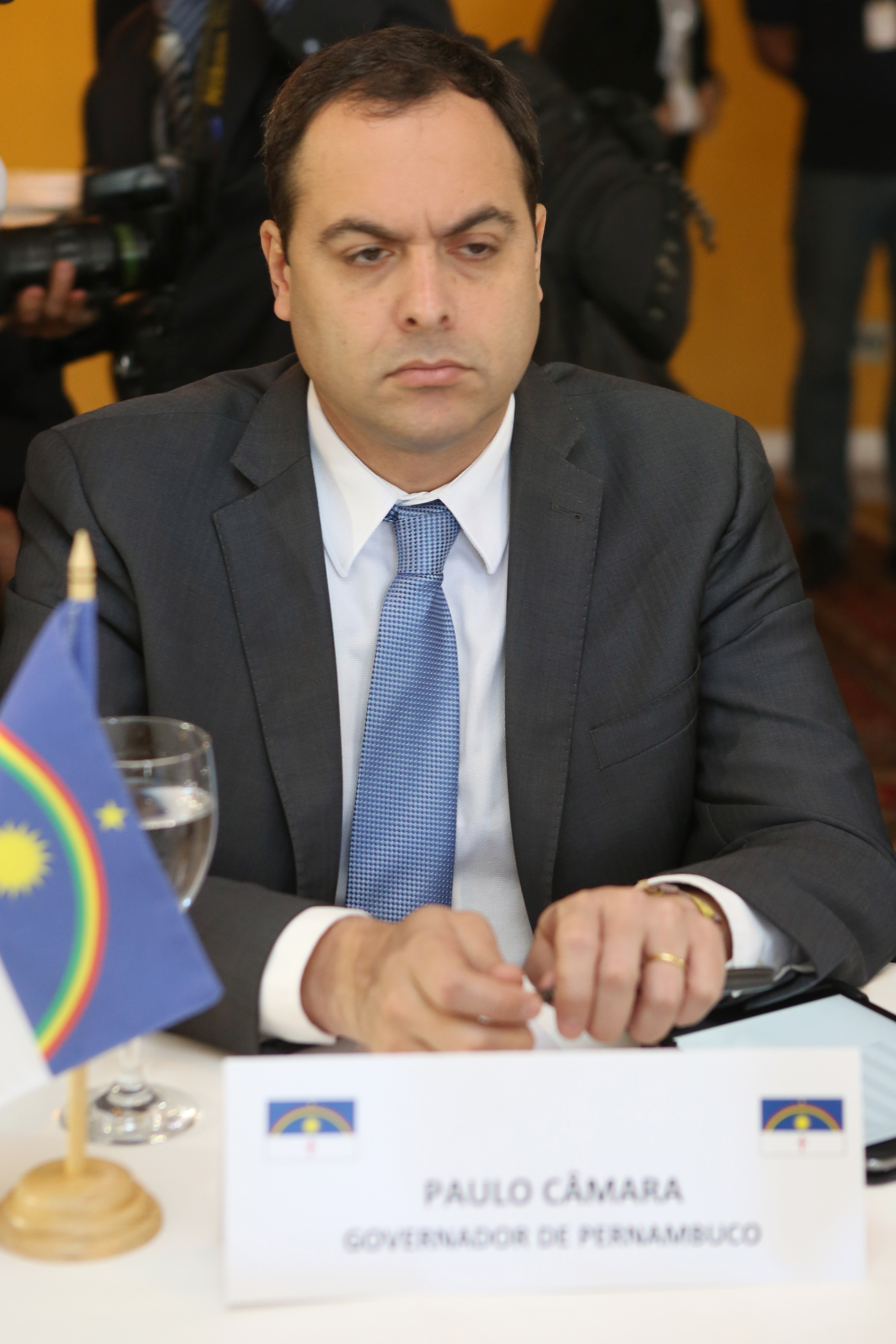

CEO of Banco do Nordeste
- Incumbent
- Assumed office 29 March 2023
- Nominated by: Luiz Inácio Lula da Silva
- Preceded by: José Gomes da Costa

Governor of Pernambuco
- In office 1 January 2015 – 1 January 2023
- Lieutenant: Raul Henry (2015–19); Luciana Santos (2019–23)
- Preceded by: João Lyra Neto
- Succeeded by: Raquel Lyra

First Vice President of the Brazilian Socialist Party
- In office 13 October 2014 – 26 January 2023
- Preceded by: Roberto Amaral
- Succeeded by: Geraldo Alckmin

Secretary of Finance of Pernambuco
- In office 2 January 2011 – 3 April 2014
- Governor: Eduardo Campos
- Preceded by: Djalmo Leão
- Succeeded by: Décio Padilha

Secretary of Tourism of Pernambuco
- In office 5 April 2010 – 1 January 2011
- Governor: Eduardo Campos
- Preceded by: Silvio Costa Filho
- Succeeded by: Alberto Feitosa

Secretary of Administration of Pernambuco
- In office 2 January 2007 – 31 March 2010
- Governor: Eduardo Campos
- Preceded by: Maurício Romão
- Succeeded by: José Francisco Neto

Personal details
- Born: Paulo Henrique Saraiva Câmara; August 8, 1972 (age 54) Recife, PE
- Party: PSB (1990–2023)
- Spouse: Ana Luiza Saraiva
- Children: 2
- Education: Federal University of Pernambuco
- Profession: Economist

Paulo Henrique Saraiva Câmara (born August 8, 1972, in Recife) is a Brazilian politician who served as governor of Pernambuco from 2015 to 2023. He became Governor of Pernambuco on January 1, 2015.

== Political career ==
In 2014, he was elected governor of Pernambuco. Câmara endorsed Marina Silva in first round and Aécio Neves in second round.
