= Gustavo Krause =

Brazilian lawyer and politician

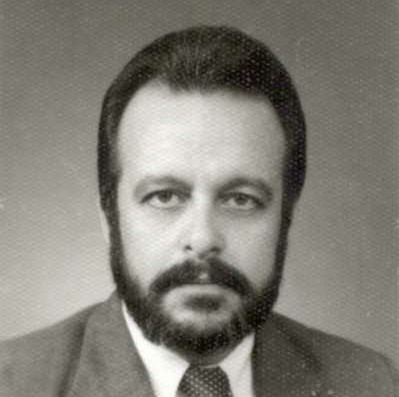

9th Minister of the Environment, Water Resources, and Amazônia Legal of Brazil
- In office 1 January 1995 – 1 January 1999
- President: Fernando Henrique Cardoso
- Preceded by: Henrique Brandão Cavalcanti (as Minister of the Environment and the Amazônia Legal)
- Succeeded by: Sarney Filho (as Minister of the Environment)

Federal Deputy for Pernambuco
- In office 1 February 1991 – 1 January 1995

141st Minister of Finance of Brazil
- In office 2 October 1992 – 16 December 1992
- President: Itamar Franco
- Preceded by: Marcílio Marques Moreira
- Succeeded by: Paulo Roberto Haddad

City Councilor of Recife
- In office 1 January 1989 – 1 February 1991

48th Governor of Pernambuco
- In office 14 May 1986 – 15 March 1987
- Preceded by: Roberto Magalhães
- Succeeded by: Miguel Arraes

8th Vice-Governor of Pernambuco
- In office 15 March 1983 – 14 May 1986
- Governor: Roberto Magalhães
- Preceded by: Roberto Magalhães
- Succeeded by: Carlos de Queirós Campos

36th Mayor of Recife
- In office 15 March 1979 – 14 May 1982
- Preceded by: Antônio Farias
- Succeeded by: Jorge Cavalcante

State Secretary of Finance of Pernambuco
- In office 1975–1979
- Governor: Moura Cavalcanti

Personal details
- Born: Gustavo Krause Gonçalves Sobrinho; 19 June 1946 (age 80) Vitória de Santo Antão, Pernambuco, Brazil
- Party: ARENA (1965–1979); PDS (1980–1985); PFL (1985–2007); DEM (2007–2022); UNIÃO (2022–present)
- Children: Priscila Krause
- Education: Federal University of Pernambuco (UFPE)
- Profession: Lawyer, politician
- Awards: Order of Military Merit

Gustavo Krause Gonçalves Sobrinho (born 19 June 1946) is a Brazilian lawyer and politician affiliated with the Brazil Union (UNIÃO). He served as the Minister of Finance and Minister of the Environment during the administrations of Itamar Franco and Fernando Henrique Cardoso. For Pernambuco, he was the governor, a federal deputy, and the state Secretary of Finance, as well as the mayor and a city councilor of the capital Recife.

He is the father of Priscila Krause, Vice-Governor of Pernambuco in 2022.

== Biography ==
Krause was born in Vitória de Santo Antão. In 1979 he was appointed by then-Governor Marco Maciel as the mayor of Recife, a position he held until 1982.

He was elected vice-governor of Pernambuco in 1986 on the ticket led by former Vice-Governor Roberto Magalhães (PDS), assuming the governorship from 1986 to 1987 due to Magalhães's resignation to run for the Senate. In 1988, he was elected a city councilor of Recife.

In 1990 he was elected a federal deputy for the state of Pernambuco. He served as the Minister of Finance of Brazil during Itamar Franco's administration, taking office on 5 October and leaving on 20 December 1992, serving only two months.

During Fernando Henrique Cardoso's first term as president (1995–1999), he served as the Minister of Urban Development and the Environment. Admitted to the Order of Military Merit in 1994 at the rank of special Commander by Itamar Franco, Krause was promoted in the following year by FHC to the rank of Grand Officer.

Currently, he is a political advisor for the DEM. He served as a substitute for Senator Marco Maciel from Pernambuco from 2003 to 2011. Since then, he has not run for political office.
