= 127th Assembly of the Inter-Parliamentary Union =

The 127th Assembly of the Inter-Parliamentary Union (IPU) was hosted in Quebec City, Canada from October 21 to 26, 2012. Approximately 1,500 delegates from 162 member parliaments, 10 associate members and observing organizations were invited to attend the event.

The Assembly's overall theme was: Citizenship, identity, and linguistic and cultural diversity in a globalized world. It included different discussion panels on issues such as: multilateralism and parliamentary diplomacy, peak oil and the prospects for energy security, peace consolidation after conflict, youth participation in today's global economy, and gender sensitive parliaments.

The 127th Assembly was the fourth IPU Assembly hosted by the Parliament of Canada since it was formally affiliated with the IPU in 1912.
