= Third World Conference of Speakers of Parliament =

The Third World Conference of Speakers of Parliament held at Geneva between 19 and 21 July 2010. The 3rd World Conference of Speakers of Parliament closed with the adoption of a declaration on the need to secure global democratic accountability. Over 130 Speakers of Parliament gave their assent to a text that affirmed how accountability and representation lie at the heart of democracy.
