= Ricardo Salles =

Brazilian politician

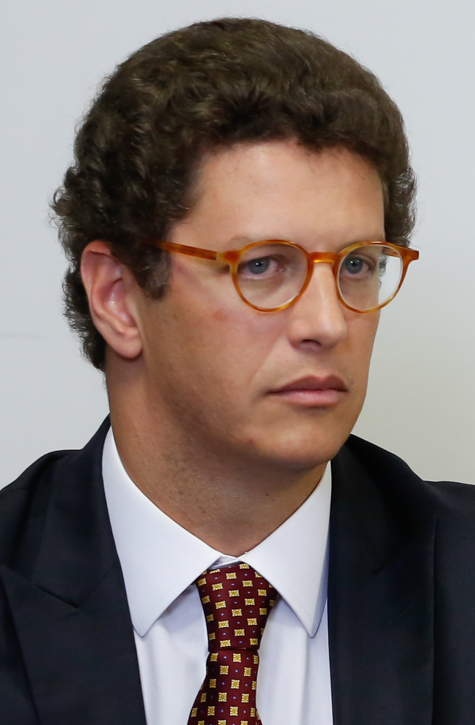

Member of the Chamber of Deputies
- Incumbent
- Assumed office 1 February 2023
- Constituency: São Paulo

State Secretary of Justice and Citizenship of São Paulo
- Assuming office 6 January 2027
- Governor: Tarcísio de Freitas
- Succeeding: Arthur Lima

Minister of Environment
- In office 1 January 2019 – 23 June 2021
- President: Jair Bolsonaro
- Preceded by: Edson Duarte
- Succeeded by: Joaquim Alvaro Pereira Leite

State Secretary of the Environment of São Paulo
- In office 18 July 2016 – 28 August 2017
- Governor: Geraldo Alckmin
- Preceded by: Patricia Iglecias
- Succeeded by: Mauricio Brusadin

Personal details
- Born: Ricardo de Aquino Salles; 8 June 1975 (age 51) São Paulo, Brazil
- Party: NOVO (2024–present)
- Other political affiliations: DEM (2006–2011); PSDB (2011–2016); PSL (2016–2017); PP (2017–2018); NOVO (2018–2020); PL (2022–2024)
- Education: Mackenzie Presbyterian University

Ricardo de Aquino Salles (Brazilian Portuguese: [ʁiˈkaʁdu d͡ʒi aˈkinu ˈsalis]; born 8 June 1975) is a Brazilian politician who has served as Minister of the Environment from 1 January 2019 to 23 June 2021, under President Jair Bolsonaro.

Salles previously served as a secretary to São Paulo Governor Geraldo Alckmin and the state's secretary of the environment.

== Biography ==
Ricardo Salles was born in Morumbi, São Paulo to a family of lawyers. He received his law degree from the Mackenzie Presbyterian University, did postgraduate studies at the universities of Coimbra and Lisbon, and studied business administration at Fundação Getúlio Vargas. For almost seven years, it was believed that Salles held a master's degree from Yale. In 2019, after Yale confirmed that Salles never studied there, he then alleged that the information was incorrectly provided by an aide.

In 2006 Salles co-founded the Movimento Endireita Brasil (literally "Straighten Brazil Movement" and a pun for “Become more Right-Wingy Brazil”). The movement opposed the presidencies of Luiz Inácio Lula da Silva and Dilma Rousseff, and supports economic liberalism. Salles was a candidate for state deputy in 2010 as a member of the Democrats (DEM), receiving 25,000 votes but failing to be elected. He was a candidate for federal deputy in the 2018 elections, but was once again not elected, receiving 36,603 votes (0.17% of all valid votes).

Since 2017, Salles is the subject of a probe by São Paulo state prosecutors for violating environmental laws. He is accused of altering the management plan for a protected area in the Tietê River with the "clear intention of benefiting economic sectors"; Salles has maintained his innocence and said that the evidence of the case "corroborates his position". He is also being investigated for possible administrative misconduct for ordering the removal of a bust of Carlos Lamarca from the Rio Turvo State Park in São Paulo, during his tenure as state environmental secretary.

Despite President Bolsonaro's critical statements on the Paris Agreement, Salles defended that Brazil should remain in the accord, while adding that the country "must be allowed to retain its autonomy when making environmental decisions". Salles has been criticized both in Brazil and internationally for relaxing regulations in favor of economic interests of the country's agribusiness, increasing deforestation of the Amazon rainforest and aggravating its consequences, like the 2019 wildfires, which prompted many calls for his resignation.

In June 2021, Salles resigned amid multiple investigations regarding allegations that he obstructed a police probe into illegal loggings.

Political offices
Preceded by Patricia Iglecias	State Secretary of the Environment of São Paulo; 2016–2017	Succeeded by Mauricio Brusadin
Preceded by Edson Duarte	Minister of the Environment; 2019–2021	Succeeded by Joaquim Alvaro Pereira Leite
