= Martin Chungong =

Cameroonian politician (born 1957)

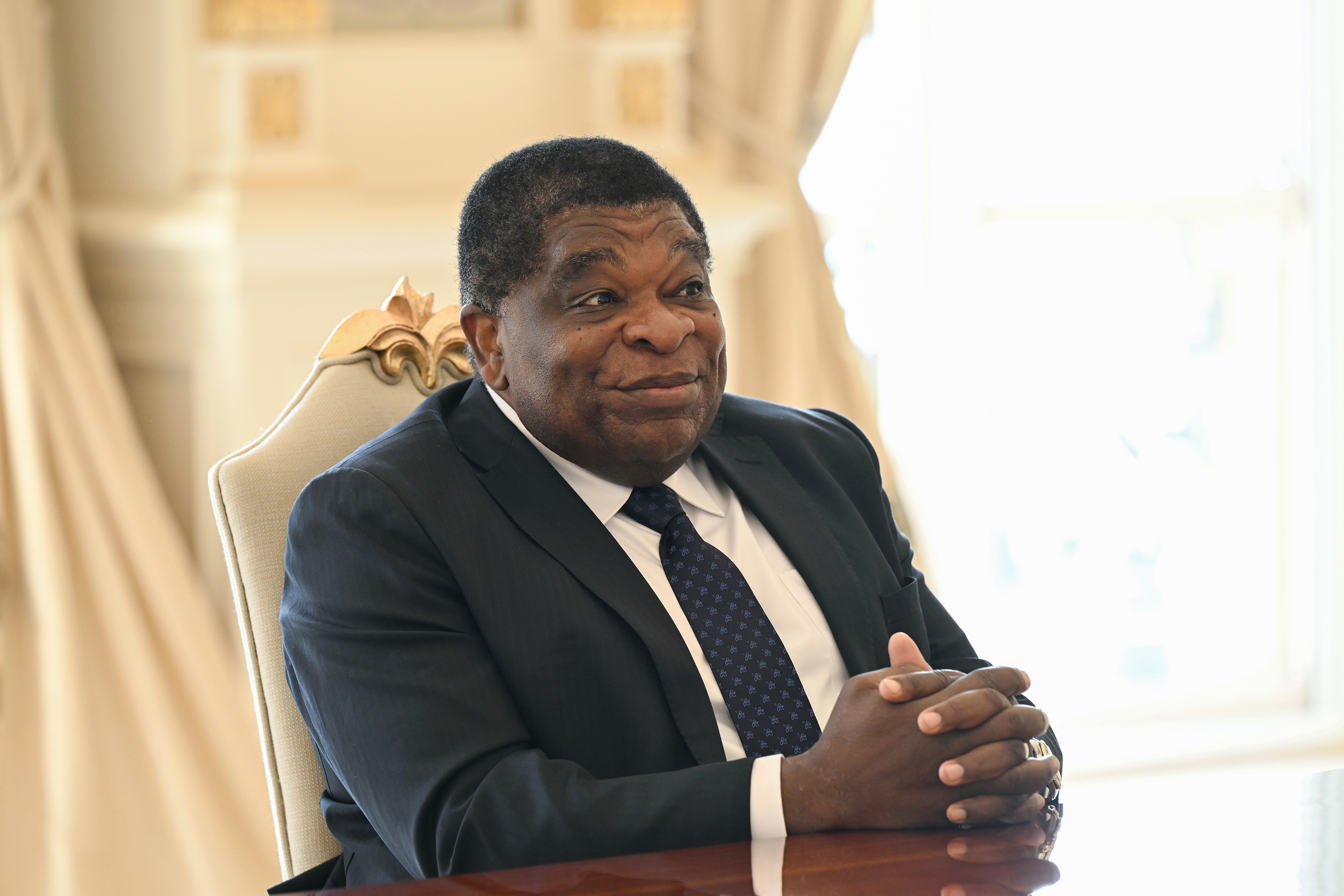

8th Secretary-General of the Inter-Parliamentary Union
- Incumbent
- Assumed office 1 July 2014

Martin Chungong (born 17 February 1957) is the eighth Secretary-General of the Inter-Parliamentary Union (IPU). As a Cameroonian, he is the first non-European and first African to be elected IPU Secretary-General. He assumed this post on 1 July 2014.

== Early life and education ==
Martin Chungong attended the University of Yaoundé, where he earned a post-graduate degree. He then attended the University of Ottawa, where he obtained a master's degree in Applied Linguistics in 1982. He also holds a post-graduate diploma from the Polytechnic of Central London (now the University of Westminster). He is fluent in English, French and Spanish.

== Career ==
Chungong has worked at the National Assembly of Cameroon for 14 years, including as the Administrative Secretary for Cameroon's representation to the IPU. He also taught linguistics and translation in the Universities of Buea and Yaoundé in Cameroon.

Joining the IPU in 1993, Chungong worked on parliamentary capacity-building in countries in transition or emerging from conflict, serving as Director for the Promotion of Democracy (2005–2011) and Director of the Division of Programmes (2011–2014). He also served as Secretary of the IPU Standing Committee on Democracy and Human Rights for eight years.

In 2012, Chungong became Deputy Secretary-General of the IPU.

== Secretary-General ==
In 2014, Martin Chungong became the first non-European and first African to be elected Secretary-General of the IPU in 125 years of the organization's existence. He was re-elected for a second term at the IPU Assembly in Dhaka in 2017.

As the head of the IPU, Chungong focuses on issues such as gender equality and proper representation in parliaments, and is a member of the High-Level Commission on the ICPD25. As chair of the Management Committee on Accountability of the Organisation for Economic Co-operation and Development (OECD) Governance Network, he has introduced governance guidelines which are meant to help "strengthen democracy".

Chungong is the Parliamentary Representative on the Steering Committee of the Global Partnership for Effective Development Cooperation, a multi-stakeholder group that works towards Sustainable Development Goals through cooperation between various sectors, such as governments, parliaments, private sector, multilateral organizations, civil society and trade unions.

As part of his work on gender equality, Chungong is the Chair of the Global Board of the International Gender Champions organization. He is also a Champion of the UN programme of Fight Against Sexual Violence in Conflict.

Chungong was appointed by then UN Secretary-General Ban Ki-moon to shape the efforts of the Scaling Up Nutrition (SUN) movement, whose goal is to make healthy diets available to all and further the efforts towards SDG2.

He sits on the Board of the Partnership for Maternal, Newborn and Child Health (PMNCH).

== Personal life ==
Martin is married to Stella Chungong, a medical doctor. They are parents to Cindy and Martin Jr.

== Awards ==
- Chevalier de l’Ordre de la Pléiade (International Organisation of La Francophonie)
- Friendship Order (National Assembly of Vietnam)
- Officer of the National Order of 27 June 1977 (Djibouti)
- Distinction from the Council of the Federation: 25 years by the Federal Assembly of Russia
- Doʻstlik Order (Uzbekistan) (2025)
