= Municipal Chamber of Recife =

Municipal Chamber of Recife Câmara Municipal do Recife

Type
- Type: Unicameral
- Seats: 39

Website
- www.recife.pe.leg.br

The Municipal Chamber of Recife (Portuguese: Câmara Municipal do Recife) is the legislative body of the government of Recife, the capital of the state of Pernambuco in Brazil.

It is unicameral and is composed of 39 councilors.
