= Carlos Minc =

Brazilian geographer, professor, environmentalist and politician

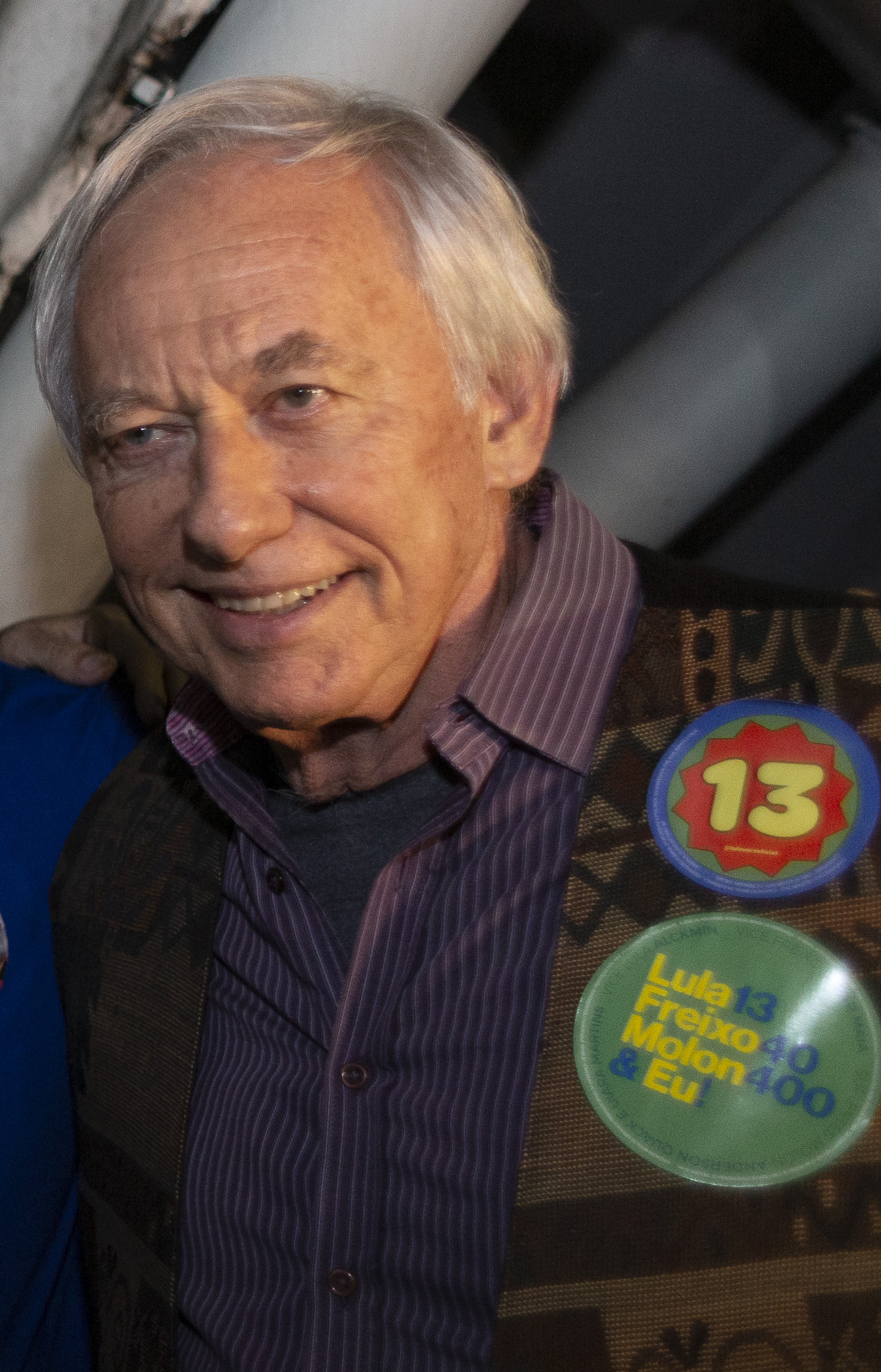

Minister of Environment
- In office 27 May 2008 – 30 March 2010
- President: Luiz Inácio Lula da Silva
- Preceded by: Marina Silva
- Succeeded by: Izabella Teixeira

State Deputy of Rio de Janeiro
- Incumbent
- Assumed office 1 January 1986
- Constituency: At-large

Personal details
- Born: Carlos Minc Baumfeld; 12 July 1951 (age 74) Rio de Janeiro, Brazil
- Party: PSB (since 2016)
- Other political affiliations: PV (1986–1989); PT (1989–2016)
- Profession: Economist, politician

Carlos Minc Baumfeld (born July 12, 1951) is a Brazilian geographer, professor, environmentalist, politician and Minister of Environment in Luiz Inácio Lula da Silva's second term as president of Brazil.

== Personal life ==
Minc was born on July 12, 1951. He studied at Universidade Federal do Rio de Janeiro. He was a student leader and participated in resistance against the military dictatorship. He was arrested in 1969 and exiled. In 1979, with the help from Amnesty, he returned to Brazil.

In 1978, Minc completed his master's degree from the Technical University of Lisbon. He completed his doctorate from the University of Paris in 1984.

Minc is married and has two children.

== Political career ==
Minc was one of the founding members of the Green Party, together with Fernando Gabeira, Alfredo Sirkis, and others.

Minc was elected Member state for the first time in 1986, in coalition with Workers' Party. He was re-elected in 1994, 1998, and 2002.

On November 22, 2006, Sérgio Cabral Filho, governor of the state of Rio de Janeiro, appointed Minc for the post of Secretary of Environment.

On May 13, 2008, Marina Silva resigned from the post of Minister of Environment. Minc became the new Minister of Environment on May 14, 2008.

On March 31, 2010 resigned from Ministry to run as State Congressman (Deputado Estadual) in Rio de Janeiro by Workers' Party and was elected with 87.210 votes.

In January 2011, was invited again to be Secretary of Environment in the Rio de Janeiro State Government where he is until now.

== Awards ==
In 1989, Minc received the Global Award 500, granted by the United Nations to those who stand out in the defence of the environment in the world.

== Books ==
Minc is also a writer. He is the author of the following books:

- Como Fazer Movimento Ecológico (Vozes, 1985)
- A Reconquista da Terra (Zahar, 1986)
- Ecologia e Política no Brasil (Espaço e Tempo/Iuperj, 1987), co-authored with Fernando Gabeira and others
- Despoluindo a Política (Relume Dumará, 1994)

Political offices
Preceded by Marina Silva	Minister of Environment; 2008–2010	Succeeded by Izabella Teixeira
