= Joaquim Leite =

Brazilian politician

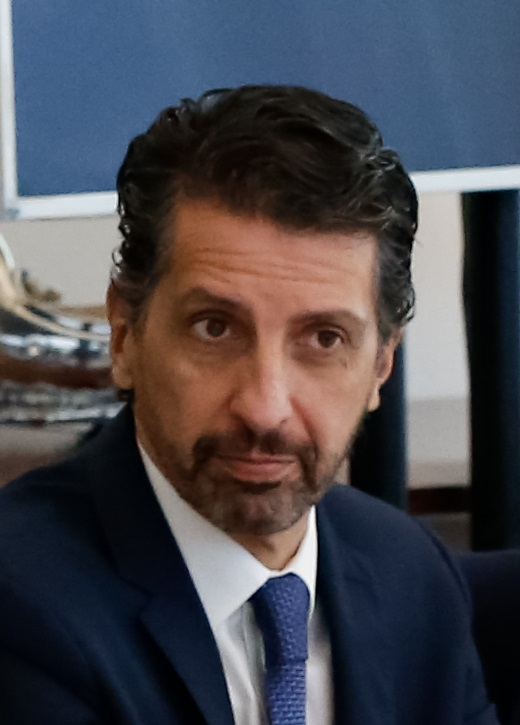

Minister of the Environment
- In office 23 June 2021 – 31 December 2022
- President: Jair Bolsonaro
- Preceded by: Ricardo Salles
- Succeeded by: Marina Silva

Personal details
- Born: Joaquim Alvaro Pereira Leite; 8 December 1967 (age 58) São Paulo, Brazil
- Education: University of Marília (BBA); Teaching and Research Institute (MBA)
- Profession: Administrator

Joaquim Alvaro Pereira Leite (born December 8, 1967) is a Brazilian politician who served as Brazil's Environment Minister in the Jair Bolsonaro Government.

Prior to his appointment, Joaquim Alvaro Pereira Leite was responsible for the Amazon and Environmental Services Secretariat at the Ministry of the Environment.

Political offices
Preceded by Ricardo Salles	Minister of the Environment; 2021–2023	Succeeded by Marina Silva
