= Seventieth anniversary of the United Nations =

The 70th anniversary ("UN70") of the founding of the United Nations (UN) fell in 2015. (Note: The UN officially came into being on 24 October 1945, when sufficient nations had ratified the UN Charter.) Around the time of the launch on 1 October by UN Secretary-General Ban Ki-moon, celebratory events took place in various locations. Several international conferences were held, including one to approve a new set of Sustainable Development Goals. A "treaty event" was held to encourage more nations to join multilateral treaties, and steps were taken towards agreement on reform of the Security Council.

== Launch by Ban Ki-Moon ==
On 1 October 2015, Ban Ki-Moon announced the beginning of celebrations to mark the anniversary when he was attending the African Union Summit in Malabo, Guinea. He said the occasion would recognise the UN's achievements, including those of the UN task forces, and its work for humanity since its foundation. Ban Ki-Moon called for further unification of the international community in order to make the UN more powerful to better handle international issues.

== Presidency of the General Assembly ==
The United Nations General Assembly unanimously elected Mogens Lykketoft, Denmark's former parliament speaker, as its new president for the 70th anniversary session. He took office in September after replacing Sam Kutesa of Uganda, the former president of the UN general assembly.

== Events and planning ==
The United Nations Academic Impact (UNAI) undertook the planning of events and other activities to mark the anniversary over a period of 16 months. These included the celebrations of the International day of Peace on 21 September and others.

=== Tree planting on Kilimanjaro ===
Over 2000 trees were planted on the slopes of Mount Kilimanjaro in Tanzania as an event to mark the UN's role in environmental protection.

=== Multilingual essay contest ===
United Nations Academic Impact invited entries from university students across the world and almost 70 students won prizes.

=== Commemorative art exhibition ===
On 29 June 2015, an exhibition to mark UN70 was organised by the Norman Rockwell Museum in Massachusetts, together with the United Nations Foundation and the Department of Public Information. The exhibition had on display the 33 original artworks of Norman Rockwell and other paintings. The name of the exhibition was "We the Peoples: Norman Rockwell's United Nations".

== Sustainable Development Goals ==
Pope Francis and heads of about 150 nations assembled at the United Nations and approved a new set of 17 Sustainable Development Goals (SDGs) which were finalised after intense discussions over three years. They emphasize more social development and environment protection. On September 25, 2015, a resolution named "Transforming Our World: the 2030 Agenda" for Sustainable Development was adopted, which included new global goals. The resolution also included 169 targets to fight inequality and end poverty, and to tackle the effects of climate change over the next fifteen years.

== Treaty event ==
The UN treaty office organised an event in New York City, at which Santiago Villalpando, the Chief of the UN Office of Legal Affairs Treaty Section, called on all the signatories to sign, ratify or accede to multilateral treaties in line with earlier undertakings they had made. About 560 multilateral treaties were deposited with the UN Secretary-General.

== Adoption of draft on UN reforms ==
The General Assembly resolved to begin text-based negotiations on a pending bill on reform of the Security Council. The efforts made were attributed to all the countries, and especially to UN General Assembly former President Sam Kutesa, who supported the action on the draft decision and took the process one step forward.

== Fourth World Conference of Speakers of Parliament ==
The theme of the Conference of Speakers of all Inter-Parliamentary Union member parliaments and of non-member parliaments from across the world, was on peace, democracy, and development.
