= Luciana Santos (politician) =

Brazilian politician

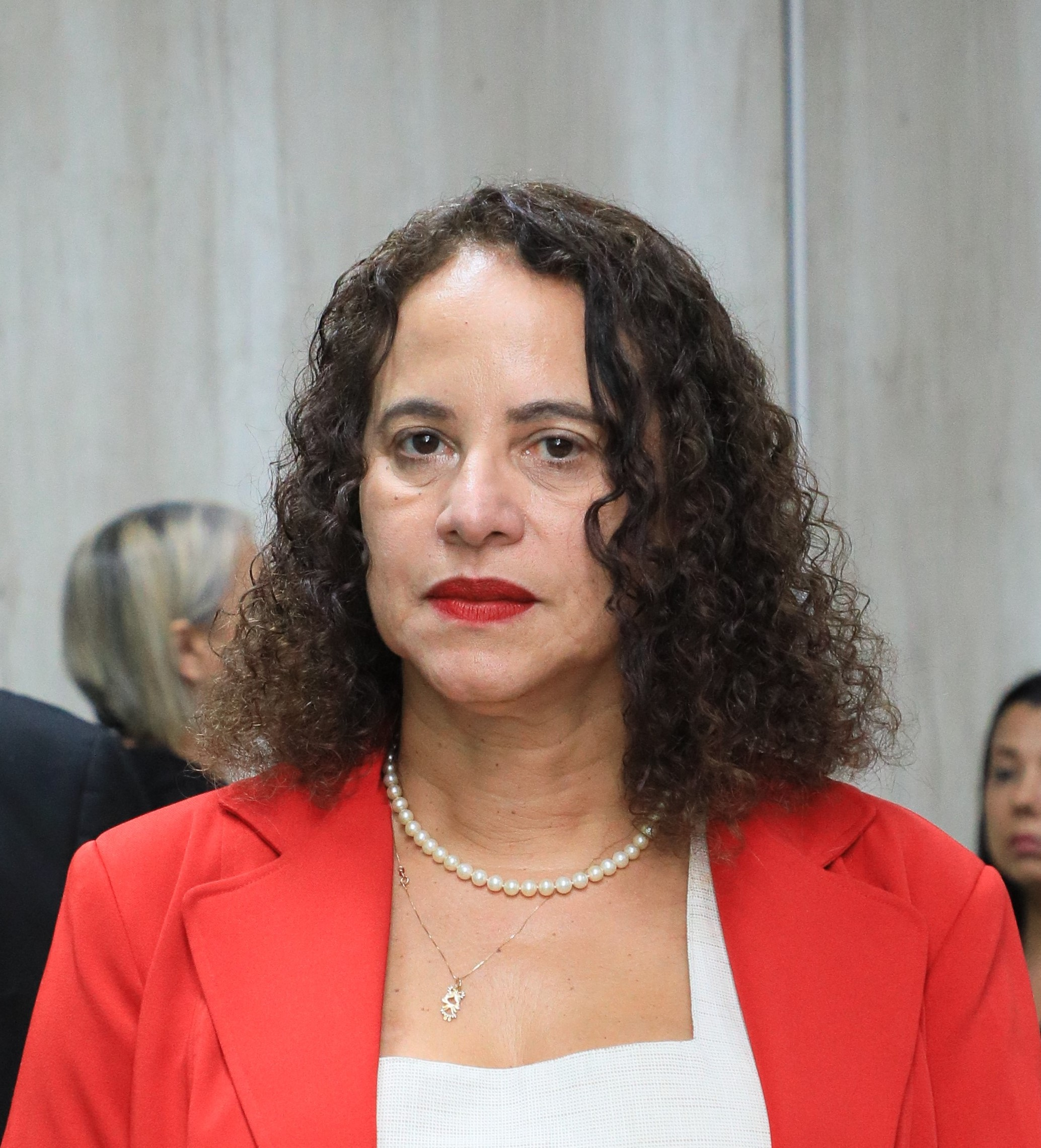
- Santos in 2023

Minister of Science, Technology and Innovation
- Incumbent
- Assumed office 1 January 2023
- President: Luiz Inácio Lula da Silva
- Preceded by: Paulo César Alvim

National President of PCdoB
- Incumbent
- Assumed office 1 June 2015
- Preceded by: Renato Rabelo

Vice Governor of Pernambuco
- In office 1 January 2019 – 1 January 2023
- Governor: Paulo Câmara
- Preceded by: Raul Henry
- Succeeded by: Priscila Krause

Federal Deputy
- In office 1 February 2011 – 31 December 2018
- Constituency: Pernambuco

Mayor of Olinda
- In office 1 January 2001 – 31 December 2008
- Preceded by: Jacilda Urquisa
- Succeeded by: Renildo Calheiros

State Deputy of Pernambuco
- In office 1 February 1997 – 31 December 2000
- Constituency: At-large

Personal details
- Born: Luciana Barbosa de Oliveira Santos; 29 December 1965 (age 60) Recife, Pernambuco, Brazil
- Party: PCdoB (since 1987)

Luciana Barbosa de Oliveira Santos (born 29 December 1965) is a Brazilian engineer and politician. Santos has served as Minister of Science, Technology and Innovation in the cabinet of President Luiz Inácio Lula da Silva since 2023. She is the first woman to head the ministry.

Santos has served as leader of the Communist Party of Brazil (PCdoB) since 2015. From 2019 to 2023, she served as vice governor of Pernambuco under PSB governor Paulo Câmara. Prior to this, she served as mayor of Olinda.

== Electoral history ==
Year	Election	Party	Office	Coalition	Partners	Party	Votes	Percent	Result
1994	State Elections of Pernambuco	State Deputy	PCdoB	Pernambuco Popular Front (PSB, PT, PDT, PPS, PV, PCdoB, PMN)	—N/a		14,126	—N/a	Not elected
1998	State Elections of Pernambuco	State Deputy	PCdoB	Pernambuco Popular Front (PSB, PT, PDT, PCdoB, PCB, PTB, PSD, PGT, PMN, PRTB)	—N/a		26,594	0.89%	Elected
2000	Municipal Election of Olinda	Mayor	PCdoB	Olinda Popular Opposition (PCdoB, PT, PSB, PGT, PHS, PCB)	Paulo Valença	PCdoB	59,066	30.72%	Runoff
2000	Municipal Election of Olinda	Mayor	PCdoB	Olinda Popular Opposition (PCdoB, PT, PSB, PGT, PHS, PCB)	Paulo Valença	PCdoB	107,739	52.34%	Elected
2004	Municipal Election of Olinda	Mayor	PCdoB	Olinda Popular Front (PCdoB, PP, PDT, PT, PTN, PCB, PL)	Paulo Valença	PCdoB	121,483	55.78%	Elected
2010	State Elections of Pernambuco	Federal Deputy	PCdoB	Pernambuco Popular Front for Federal and State Deputy (PRB, PP, PDT, PT, PTB, PSC, PR, PSB, PCdoB)	—N/a		105,253	2.39%	Elected
2014	State Elections of Pernambucp	Federal Deputy	PCdoB	Pernambuco Popular Front for Federal Deputy (PSB, PMDB, PCdoB, PV, PR, PSD, PPS, PSDB, SD, PPL, DEM, PROS, PP, PEN, PTC)	—N/a		85,053	1.90%	Elected
2016	Municipal Election of Olinda	Mayor	PCdoB	Olinda Popular Front (PCdoB, PSD, PP, PRTB, PDT)	Alvaro Ribeiro	PCdoB	32,929	16.57%	Not elected
2018	State Elections of Pernambuco	Vice Governor	PCdoB	Pernambuco Popular Front (PSB, PCdoB, PT, MDB, PP, PR, PMN, PTC, PRP, PATRI, PSD, PPL, SD)	Paulo Câmara	PSB	1,918,219	50.70%	Elected
2022	State Elections of Pernambuco	Vice Governor	PCdoB	Pernambuco Popular Front (PSB, FE Brasil, MDB, Republicanos, PDT, PP)	Danilo Cabral	PSB	885,994	18.06%	Not elected

Political offices
Preceded by Jacilda Urquisa	Mayor of Olinda; 2001–2009	Succeeded by Renildo Calheiros
Preceded by Raul Henry	Vice Governor of Pernambuco; 2019–2023	Succeeded by Priscila Krause
Preceded by Paulo César Alvim	Minister of Science, Technology and Innovation; 2023–present	Incumbent
Party political offices
Preceded by Renato Rabelo	National President of the Communist Party of Brazil; 2015–present	Incumbent
