= Inter-Parliamentary Union =

International organization of national parliaments

- Founded: 30 June 1889
- Founder: Frédéric Passy, William Randal Cremer
- Legal status: International organization
- Headquarters: Geneva, Switzerland
- Members: 183 Members; 15 Associate Members
- President: Milton Dick
- Secretary General: Martin Chungong
- Website: www.ipu.org

The Inter-Parliamentary Union (IPU; French: Union Interparlementaire, UIP) is an international organization of national parliaments. Its primary purpose is to promote democratic governance, accountability, and cooperation among its members; other initiatives include advancing gender parity among legislatures, empowering youth participation in politics, and sustainable development.

The organization was established in 1889 as the Inter-Parliamentary Conference. Its founders were statesmen Frédéric Passy of France and William Randal Cremer of the United Kingdom, who sought to create the first permanent forum for political multilateral negotiations. Initially, IPU membership was reserved for individual parliamentarians, but has since transformed to include the legislatures of sovereign states. As of 2025, the national parliaments of 183 countries are members of the IPU, while 15 are associated members, most of whom are regional parliaments. Some of the organization's member states are not democratic by indexes.

The IPU facilitates the development of international law and institutions, strengthening the foundations and enhancing the vision for peace and the common good, including the Permanent Court of Arbitration, the League of Nations, and the United Nations. It also sponsors and takes part in international conferences and forums, and has permanent observer status at the United Nations General Assembly. Consequently, eight individuals associated with the organization are Nobel Peace Prize laureates.

== History ==
The organisation's initial objective was the arbitration of conflicts. The IPU played an important part in setting up the Permanent Court of Arbitration in The Hague. Over time, its mission has evolved towards the promotion of democracy and inter-parliamentary dialogue. The IPU has worked for establishment of institutions at the inter-governmental level, including the United Nations, an organization with which it cooperates and with which it has permanent observer status.

The headquarters of the union have been moved several times since its inception. Locations:

- 1892–1911: Bern (Switzerland)
- 1911–1914: Brussels (Belgium)
- 1914–1920: Oslo (Norway)
- 1921–present: Geneva (Switzerland)

Eight leading personalities of the IPU have received Nobel Peace Prizes:

- 1901: Frédéric Passy (France)
- 1902: Charles Albert Gobat (Switzerland)
- 1903: Randal Cremer (United Kingdom)
- 1908: Fredrik Bajer (Denmark)
- 1909: Auguste Marie François Beernaert (Belgium)
- 1913: Henri La Fontaine (Belgium)
- 1921: Christian Lange (Norway)
- 1927: Ferdinand Buisson (France)

== Members and organization ==
=== Members ===
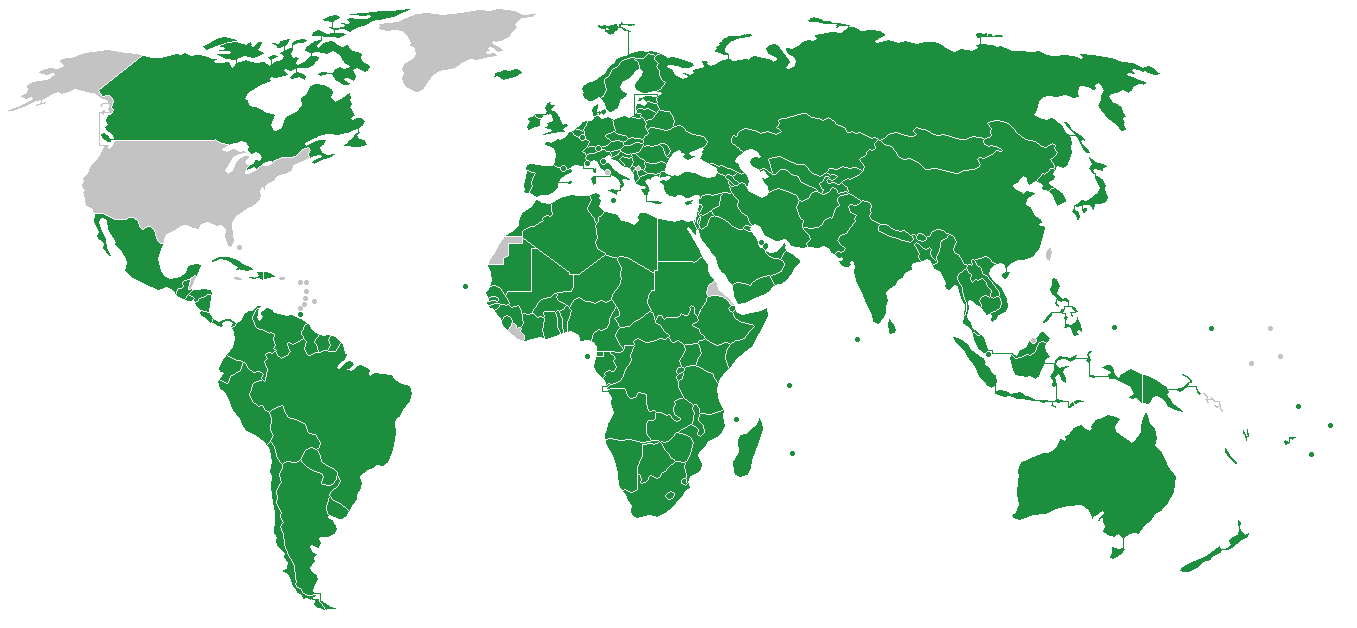
Map of IPU member states

At its founding on 30 June 1889, the Inter-Parliamentary Conference had eight members: Austria-Hungary, Belgium, Denmark, France, Italy, Liberia, Spain, and the United Kingdom. The United States also attended but did not formally adopt the treaty of arbitration.

The Inter-Parliamentary Union currently has 183 members.

- Regional parliamentary assemblies may be admitted by the Governing Council as Associate Members
- Every Parliament constituted in conformity with the laws of a sovereign State whose population it represents and on whose territory it functions may request affiliation to the Inter-Parliamentary Union. The decision to admit or readmit a Parliament shall be taken by the Governing Council.

It is the duty of the Members of the IPU to submit the resolutions of the IPU within their respective Parliament, in the most appropriate form; to communicate them to the Government; to stimulate their implementation and to inform the IPU Secretariat, as often and fully as possible, particularly in its annual reports, as to the steps taken and the results obtained.

Almost all countries have a parliament member of IPU, with the notable exception of the United States, although the 12th (1904), the 23rd (1925) and the 42nd (1953) conferences were hosted in the US.

Associate Members

The participating parliamentary assemblies other than national parliaments are the following:

Name	Related organization
Andean Parliament	CAN
Arab Parliament	
Central American Parliament (PARLCEN)	SICA
East African Legislative Assembly	EAC
European Parliament	EU
CIS Interparliamentary Assembly	CIS
Inter-Parliamentary Committee of the West African Economic and Monetary Union	UEMOA
Latin American and Caribbean Parliament (PARLATINO)	PARLATINO
Pan-African Parliament	AU
Parliament of the Economic Community of West African States	ECOWAS
Parliament of the Central African Economic and Monetary Community	CEMAC
Parliamentary Assembly of La Francophonie (APF)	OIF
Parliamentary Assembly of the Council of Europe (PACE)	CoE
Parliamentary Assembly of the Black Sea Economic Cooperation	BSEC

=== Organs ===
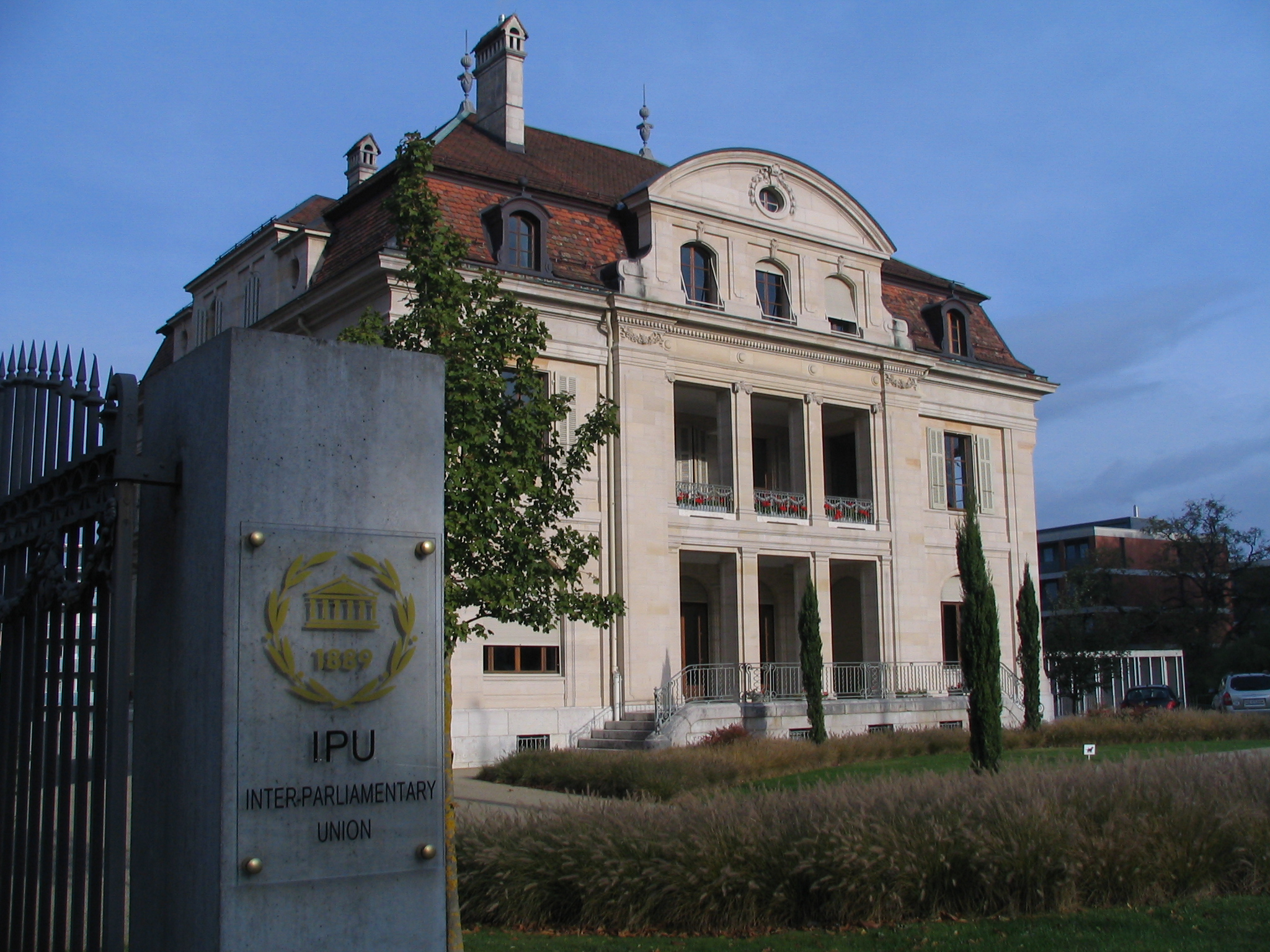
Headquarters of the IPU in Geneva (2010)

The organs of the Inter-Parliamentary Union are:

- Assembly. Meeting biannually, the Assembly is composed of parliamentarians designated as delegates by the Members. The Assembly is assisted in its work by Standing Committees, whose number and terms of reference are determined by the Governing Council; Standing Committees shall normally prepare reports and draft resolutions for the Assembly. No one delegate may record more than ten votes.
- Governing Council. The Governing Council normally holds two sessions a year. The Governing Council is composed of three representatives from each Member. The term of office of a member of the Governing Council lasts from one Assembly to the next and all the members of the Governing Council must be sitting members of Parliament. The Governing Council elects the President of the Inter-Parliamentary Union for a period of three years. It also elects the members of the executive committee and appoints the Secretary General of the Union.
- Executive Committee. The executive committee is composed of the President of the Inter-Parliamentary Union, 15 members belonging to different Parliaments (elected by the Governing Council; not less than 12 are elected from among the members of the Governing Council) and the President of the Coordinating Committee of the Meeting of Women Parliamentarians. The fifteen elected seats are assigned to the geopolitical groups. Only parliamentarians from States where women have both the right to vote and the right to stand for election are eligible to the executive committee. The executive committee is the administrative organ of the Inter-Parliamentary Union. The current President is Dr. Tulia Ackson, Speaker of the National Assembly of the United Republic of Tanzania and the second woman to hold the position, who was elected in October 2023.
- Secretariat. The Secretariat constitutes the totality of the staff of the organisation under the direction of the Secretary General, currently Martin Chungong of Cameroon.

The Association of Secretaries General of Parliaments is a consultative body of the Inter-Parliamentary Union.

== Assemblies ==
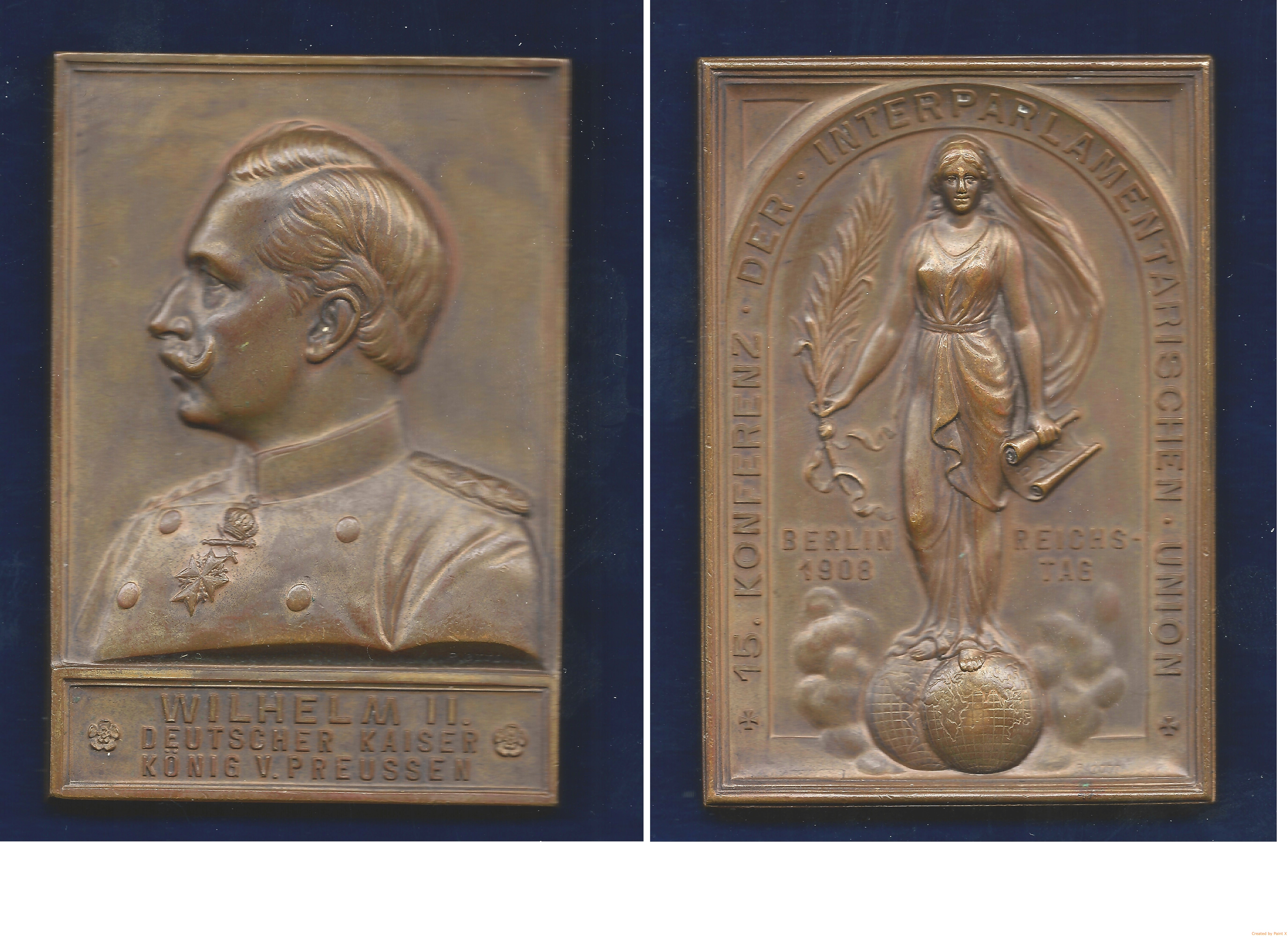
Art Nouveau plaque-medallion for the 15th Inter-Parliamentary Conference 1908 in Berlin

The Assembly is the IPU's main political body through which the IPU's Member Parliaments adopt parliamentary resolutions on global issues. It plays a pivotal role in addressing the issues which threaten peace, democracy and sustainable development, including through its four thematic standing committees. IPU Assemblies are held twice a year either in Geneva or hosted by Member Parliaments.

#	Host city	Host country	Year
153rd	Arusha	Tanzania	2026
152nd	Istanbul	Turkey	2026
151st	Geneva	Switzerland	2025
150th	Tashkent	Uzbekistan	2025
149th	Geneva	Switzerland	2024
148th	Geneva	Switzerland	2024
147th	Luanda	Angola	2023
146th	Manama	Bahrain	2023
145th	Kigali	Rwanda	2022
144th	Nusa Dua, Bali	Indonesia	2022
143rd	Madrid	Spain	2021
142nd	Virtual	Virtual	2021
141st	Belgrade	Serbia	2019
140th	Doha	Qatar	2019
139th	Geneva	Switzerland	2018
138th	Geneva	Switzerland	2018
137th	Saint Petersburg	Russia	2017
136th	Dhaka	Bangladesh	2017
135th	Geneva	Switzerland	2016
134th	Lusaka	Zambia	2016
133rd	Geneva	Switzerland	2015
132nd	Hanoi	Vietnam	2015
131st	Geneva	Switzerland	2014
130th	Geneva	Switzerland	2014
129th	Geneva	Switzerland	2013
128th	Quito	Ecuador	2013
127th	Quebec City	Canada	2012
126th	Kampala	Uganda	2012
125th	Bern	Switzerland	2011
124th	Panama City	Panama	2011
123rd	Geneva	Switzerland	2010
122nd	Bangkok	Thailand	2010
121st	Geneva	Switzerland	2009
120th	Addis Ababa	Ethiopia	2009
119th	Geneva	Switzerland	2008
118th	Cape Town	South Africa	2008
117th	Geneva	Switzerland	2007
116th	Nusa Dua, Bali	Indonesia	2007
115th	Geneva	Switzerland	2006
114th	Nairobi	Kenya	2006
113th	Geneva	Switzerland	2005
112th	Manila	Philippines	2005
111th	Geneva	Switzerland	2004
110th	Mexico City	Mexico	2004
109th	Geneva	Switzerland	2003
108th	Santiago	Chile	2003
107th	Marrakesh	Morocco	2002
106th	Ouagadougou	Burkina Faso	2001
105th	Havana	Cuba	2001
104th	Jakarta	Indonesia	2000
103rd	Amman	Jordan	2000
102nd	Berlin	Germany	1999
101st	Brussels	Belgium	1999
100th	Moscow	Russia	1998
99th	Windhoek	Namibia	1998
98th	Cairo	Egypt	1997
97th	Seoul	South Korea	1997
96th	Beijing	China	1996
95th	Istanbul	Turkey	1996
94th	Bucharest	Romania	1995
93rd	Madrid	Spain	1995
92nd	Copenhagen	Denmark	1994
91st	Paris	France	1994
90th	Canberra	Australia	1993
89th	New Delhi	India	1993
88th	Stockholm	Sweden	1992
87th	Yaoundé	Cameroon	1992
86th	Santiago	Chile	1991
85th	Pyongyang	North Korea	1991
84th	Punta del Este	Uruguay	1990
83rd	Nicosia	Cyprus	1990
82nd	London	United Kingdom	1989
81st	Budapest	Hungary	1989
80th	Sofia	Bulgaria	1988
79th	Guatemala City	Guatemala	1988
78th	Bangkok	Thailand	1987
77th	Managua	Nicaragua	1987
76th	Buenos Aires	Argentina	1986
75th	Mexico City	Mexico	1986
74th	Ottawa	Canada	1985
73rd	Lomé	Togo	1985
72nd	Geneva	Switzerland	1984
71st	Geneva	Switzerland	1984
70th	Seoul	South Korea	1983
69th	Rome	Italy	1982
68th	Havana	Cuba	1981
67th	Berlin	East Germany	1980
66th	Caracas	Venezuela	1979
65th	Bonn	Germany	1978
64th	Sofia	Bulgaria	1977
63rd	Madrid	Spain	1976
62nd	London	United Kingdom	1975
61st	Tokyo	Japan	1974
60th	Rome	Italy	1972
59th	Paris	France	1971
58th	The Hague	Netherlands	1970
57th	New Delhi	India	1969
56th	Lima	Peru	1968
55th	Tehran	Iran	1966
54th	Ottawa	Canada	1965
53rd	Copenhagen	Denmark	1964
52nd	Belgrade	Yugoslavia	1963
51st	Brasília	Brazil	1962
50th	Brussels	Belgium	1961
49th	Tokyo	Japan	1960
48th	Warsaw	Poland	1959
47th	Rio de Janeiro	Brazil	1958
46th	London	United Kingdom	1957
45th	Bangkok	Thailand	1956
44th	Helsinki	Finland	1955
43rd	Vienna	Austria	1954
42nd	Washington, D.C.	United States	1953
41st	Bern	Switzerland	1952
40th	Istanbul	Turkey	1951
39th	Dublin	Ireland	1950
38th	Stockholm	Sweden	1949
37th	Rome	Italy	1948
36th	Cairo	Egypt	1947
35th	Oslo	Norway	1939
34th	The Hague	Netherlands	1938
33rd	Paris	France	1937
32nd	Budapest	Hungary	1936
31st	Brussels	Belgium	1935
30th	Istanbul	Turkey	1934
29th	Madrid	Spain	1933
28th	Geneva	Switzerland	1932
27th	Bucharest	Romania	1931
26th	London	United Kingdom	1930
25th	Berlin	Germany	1928
24th	Paris	France	1927
23rd	Washington, D.C.	United States	1925
23rd	Ottawa	Canada	1925
22nd	Bern	Switzerland	1924
21st	Copenhagen	Denmark	1923
20th	Vienna	Austria	1922
19th	Stockholm	Sweden	1921
18th	The Hague	Netherlands	1913
17th	Geneva	Switzerland	1912
16th	Brussels	Belgium	1910
15th	Berlin	Germany	1908
14th	London	United Kingdom	1906
13th	Brussels	Belgium	1905
12th	St. Louis	United States	1904
11th	Vienna	Austria-Hungary	1903
10th	Paris	France	1900
9th	Christiania	Denmark	1899
8th	Brussels	Belgium	1897
7th	Budapest	Austria-Hungary	1896
6th	Brussels	Belgium	1895
5th	The Hague	Netherlands	1894
4th	Bern	Switzerland	1892
3rd	Rome	Italy	1891
2nd	London	United Kingdom	1890
1st	Paris	France	1889

== Presidents ==
President	Years	Country
August Beernaert	1909–1912	Belgium
Philip Stanhope	1912–1922	United Kingdom
Theodor Adelsward	1922–1928	Sweden
Fernand Bouisson	1928–1934	France
Henri Carton de Wiart	1934–1947	Belgium
William Wedgwood Benn	1947–1957	United Kingdom
Giuseppe Codacci-Pisanelli	1957–1962	Italy
Ranieri Mazzilli	1962–1967	Brazil
Abderrahman Abdennebi	1967–1968	Tunisia
André Chandernagor	1968–1973	France
Gurdial Singh Dhillon	1973–1976	India
Thomas Williams	1976–1979	United Kingdom
Rafael Caldera	1979–1982	Venezuela
Johannes Virolainen	1982–1983	Finland
Emile Cuvelier	1983	Belgium
Izz El Din El Sayed	1983–1985	Sudan
John Page	1985	United Kingdom
Hans Stercken	1985–1988	West Germany
Dauda Sow	1988–1991	Senegal
Michael Marshall	1991–1994	United Kingdom
Ahmed Fathi Sorour	1994–1997	Egypt
Miguel Angel Martinez	1997–1999	Spain
Najma Heptulla	1999–2002	India
Sergio Paes Verdugo	2002–2005	Chile
Pier Ferdinando Casini	2005–2008	Italy
Theo-Ben Gurirab	2008–2011	Namibia
Abdelwahad Radi	2011–2014	Morocco
Saber Hossain Chowdhury	2014–2017	Bangladesh
Gabriela Cuevas Barron	2017–2020	Mexico
Duarte Pacheco	2020–2023	Portugal
Tulia Ackson	2023–2026	Tanzania
Milton Dick	2026–	Australia

== Amendments to the Statutes ==
Any proposal to amend the Statutes shall be submitted in writing to the Secretariat of the Union at least three months before the meeting of the Assembly. The Secretariat will immediately communicate all such proposals to the Members of the Union. The consideration of such proposed amendments shall be automatically placed on the agenda of the Assembly.

Any sub-amendments shall be submitted in writing to the Secretariat of the Union at least six weeks before the meeting of the Assembly. The Secretariat will immediately communicate all such sub-amendments to the Members of the Union.

After hearing the opinion of the Governing Council, expressed through a simple majority vote, the Assembly shall decide on such proposals by a two-thirds majority vote.

== The IPU and the United Nations ==
The IPU marked the 50th anniversary of the United Nations, in 1995, by holding a special session in the General Assembly Hall before the start of the session, where they planned for closer cooperation with the United Nations. The General Assembly Resolution passed during that session requested the Secretary-General to put this into action. An agreement was signed between the IPU and the Secretary-General on 24 July 1996 and subsequently ratified by a General Assembly Resolution, where the United Nations recognizes IPU as the world organization of parliaments. Pursuant to this resolution, the Secretary-General submitted a report which was noted with appreciation by the General Assembly, who requested further strengthening of cooperation and another report. This report detailed the measures that had been taken, including opening a liaison office in New York, and cooperation on issues such land-mines and the promotion of representative democracy. Following an entire morning of debate the General Assembly passed a resolution which simply stated that it "looks forward to continued close cooperation".

The following year (1999) the Secretary-General reported on an increased number of areas of cooperation, the issue was debated for an entire afternoon (interrupted by a minute of silence held for tribute to Vazgen Sargsyan, the Prime Minister of Armenia who had just at that time been killed by gunmen), and passed a resolution requesting the IPU be allowed to address the Millennium General Assembly directly.

Following another report, and another half-day debate, the General Assembly welcomed the IPU declaration entitled "The Parliamentary vision for international cooperation at the dawn of the third millennium" and called for the Secretary-General to explore new and further ways in which the relationship could be strengthened.

On 19 November 2002 the IPU was granted observer status to the General Assembly.

In the Resolution 59/19, Cooperation between the United Nations and the Inter-Parliamentary Union, the UN General Assembly takes note of the recommendations in regard to engaging parliamentarians more systematically in the work of the United Nations.

The final declaration of the Second World Conference of Speakers of Parliament, hosted at United Nations headquarters, took place in September 2005, was entitled Bridging the democracy gap in international relations: A stronger role for parliament.

In the Resolution adopted by the UN General Assembly, 61/6, Cooperation between the United Nations and the Inter-Parliamentary Union, on 27 November 2006, it calls for the further development of the annual parliamentary hearing at the United Nations and other specialized parliamentary meetings in the context of major United Nations meetings as joint United Nations-Inter-Parliamentary Union events.

Every year during the fall session of the General Assembly the IPU organises a Parliamentary Hearing. A resolution on cooperation between the United Nations and the IPU allowed for circulation of official IPU documents in the General Assembly.

UN and the IPU cooperate closely in various fields, in particular peace and security, economic and social development, international law, human rights, and democracy and gender issues, but IPU has not obtained the status of UN General Assembly subsidiary organ.

=== Fourth World Conference of Speakers of Parliament ===
The fourth world conference on UN 70th anniversary marked by Ban Ki-Moon as "UN70" was organised in September 2015 where Speakers of all IPU (Inter-Parliamentary Union) member parliaments and of non-member parliaments were invited from across the world. The theme was on peace, democracy, and development.

=== United Nations reports, resolutions, and agreements ===
- Resolution of the United Nations: Cooperation between the United Nations and the Inter-Parliamentary Union, 27 November 2006.
- Report of the United Nations Secretary-General: Cooperation between the United Nations and regional and other organizations, 16 August 2006.
- Resolution of the United Nations General Assembly: Cooperation between the United Nations and the Inter-Parliamentary Union, 8 November 2004.
- Report of the United Nations Secretary-General: Cooperation between the United Nations and the Inter-Parliamentary Union (see Part 5 of the Annex), 1 September 2004.
- Resolution adopted by the General Assembly: Cooperation between the United Nations and the Inter-Parliamentary Union, 21 November 2002.
- Resolution adopted by the General Assembly: Observer status for the Inter-Parliamentary Union in the General Assembly, 19 November 2002.
- Report of the United Nations Secretary-General: Cooperation between the United Nations and the Inter-Parliamentary Union, 3 September 2002.
- Cooperation Agreement between the United Nations and the Inter-Parliamentary Union of 1996.

== See also ==
- Inter-parliamentary institution
- e-democracy
- Global democracy
- Third World Conference of Speakers of Parliament
- International Day of Democracy
- Internationalism (politics)
- List of peace activists
- Millennium Development Goals
- Supranational union
- Sustainable Development Goals
- United Nations Democracy Fund
- United Nations Parliamentary Assembly
- United Nations Department of Economic and Social Affairs (UNDESA)
