= Sarney Filho =

Brazilian lawyer and politician

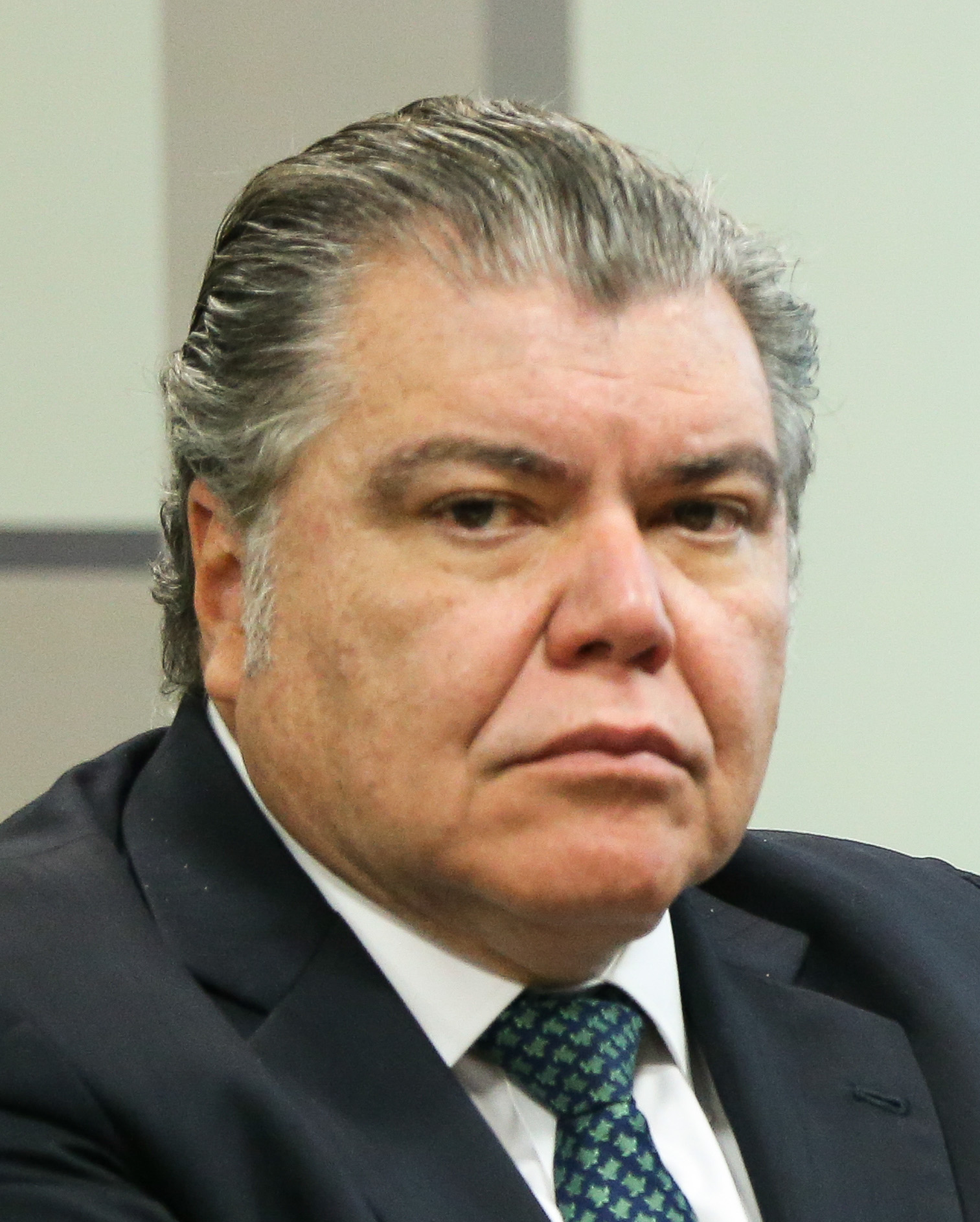

Minister of Environment
- In office 12 May 2016 – 6 April 2018
- President: Michel Temer
- Preceded by: Izabella Teixeira
- Succeeded by: Edson Duarte
- In office 1 January 1999 – 5 March 2002
- President: Fernando Henrique Cardoso
- Preceded by: Gustavo Krause
- Succeeded by: José Carlos Carvalho
Legislative offices
Federal Deputy
In office 19 April 2018 – 1 January 2019
Constituency	Maranhão
In office 19 March 2002 – 12 May 2016
Constituency	Maranhão
In office 22 January 1990 – 1 January 1999
Constituency	Maranhão
In office 15 September 1988 – 1 July 1989
Constituency	Maranhão
In office 1 February 1983 – 5 May 1988
Constituency	Maranhão
State Deputy of Maranhão
In office 1 February 1979 – 1 February 1983
Constituency	At-large

Personal details
- Born: José Sarney Filho; 14 June 1957 (age 69) São Luís, Maranhão, Brazil
- Party: PV (2005–present)
- Other political affiliations: ARENA (1970–1980); PDS (1980–1985); PFL (1985–2005)
- Children: 4 (including Adriano)
- Parents: José Sarney (father); Marly Sarney (mother)
- Profession: Lawyer

José Sarney Filho, better known as Zequinha Sarney (born 14 June 1957), is a Brazilian lawyer and politician, current Secretary of Environment of the Brazilian Federal District. He is son of the former senator and former president of Brazil José Sarney and brother of Roseana Sarney and Fernando Sarney. On 12 May 2016, Sarney was appointed by Michel Temer, Minister of Environment.

== Biography ==
Born into a family closely linked to politics, José Sarney Filho is the son of José Sarney and Marly Sarney. His father was the fifth senator and was president of the Republic between 1985 and 1990. He is also the brother of the former governor of Maranhão, Roseana Sarney, and the businessman Fernando Sarney.

=== Political career ===
José Sarney Filho began his career in public life at a young age by the National Renewal Alliance (ARENA) in 1970. He was elected a state deputy for Maranhão in 1978 and moved to the Social Democratic Party (PDS) and was elected for his first term as a federal deputy in 1982. On the occasion of the presidential succession at the end of the João Figueiredo administration, he left the party in 1986 and joined the Liberal Front Party (PFL), now Democrat (DEM), and was reelected in 1986, 1990, 1994, 1998, and 2002.

He retired from his mandate to hold the positions of Secretary for Political Affairs of the State of Maranhão in 1988 and from 1989 to 1990 and Minister of Environment in the government of Fernando Henrique Cardoso between 1 January 1999 and 5 March 2002, following the breakup of his party with the government.

Since 2005, he has been affiliated with the Green Party (PV) and has been re-elected in 2006, 2010 and 2014, being one of his main leaders in the National Congress and being in his ninth consecutive term.

In May 2016, he again assumed the position of Minister of the Environment, in the interim government of Michel Temer.

=== Personal life ===
From his first marriage with Lucialice Cordeiro, José Sarney Filho had three children: José Adriano and the twins Marcos and Gabriel. His fourth son, Daniel Sarney, lives in Canada with his mother, the anthropologist Annette Leibing. Currently, Sarney Filho is married to Camila Serra, mother of his fifth and last son, João José Sarney, born in 2006.

=== Controversies ===
In one of the investigations of Operation Lava Jato, in June 2016, former Senator Sérgio Machado, in terms of an award-winning demarcation, pointed out that he passed on former President José Sarney, according to him, 2.25 million reais per Means of legal electoral donations, including 400,000 reais for the Green Party of Maranhão. Even without being accused by Sérgio Machado, some press vehicles assume that the supposed indication for the legal donation to the Green Party of Maranhão would be for the federal deputy campaign of Sarney Filho in 2010, when the same belonged to the PV. Sarney Filho is not investigated in the Lava Jet.

Political offices
Preceded by Gustavo Krause	Minister of Environment; 1999–2002; 2016–2018	Succeeded by José Carlos Carvalho
Preceded by Izabella Teixeira	Minister of Environment; 1999–2002; 2016–2018	Succeeded by Edson Duarte
